= List of cities, towns and villages in North Brabant =

This is a list of cities, towns and villages in the province of North Brabant, in the Netherlands.

Name	Municipality	Coordinates
Aalst	Waalre	51°23′45″N 5°28′40″E
Aarle	Best	51°30′45″N 5°21′45″E
Aarle-Rixtel	Laarbeek	51°30′35″N 5°38′20″E
Abcoven	Goirle	51°31′40″N 5°05′00″E
Achterbosch	Laarbeek	51°30′40″N 5°34′20″E
Achterbosch	Asten	51°24′35″N 5°46′40″E
Achterbroek	Someren	51°25′45″N 5°41′10″E
Achterdijk	Moerdijk	51°39′25″N 4°37′10″E
Achtereind	Waalre	51°22′55″N 5°29′25″E
Achterste Brug	Valkenswaard	51°16′45″N 5°25′45″E
Achterste Diesdonk	Asten	51°25′45″N 5°42′45″E
Achterste Heide	Oss	51°45′35″N 5°34′45″E
Achterste Heikant	Reusel-De Mierden	51°20′55″N 5°08′25″E
Achterste Hermalen	Schijndel	51°36′15″N 5°24′15″E
Achterste Rith	Breda	51°33′15″N 4°42′50″E
Achtmaal	Zundert	51°27′15″N 4°35′05″E
Akker	Roosendaal	51°30′35″N 4°23′05″E
Almkerk	Woudrichem	51°46′15″N 4°57′35″E
Alphen	Alphen-Chaam	51°28′55″N 4°57′30″E
Alphen-Oosterwijk	Alphen-Chaam	51°30′05″N 4°58′30″E
Alvershool	Nuenen, Gerwen en Nederwetten	51°29′00″N 5°33′55″E
Andel	Woudrichem	51°47′00″N 5°03′30″E
Anneville	Alphen-Chaam	51°32′35″N 4°49′05″E
Arendnest	Boekel	51°35′40″N 5°41′45″E
Asten	Asten	51°24′15″N 5°44′55″E
Baarle-Nassau	Baarle-Nassau	51°26′50″N 4°55′45″E
Baarle-Nassau-grens	Baarle-Nassau	51°24′05″N 4°56′05″E
Baarschot	Hilvarenbeek	51°27′30″N 5°11′10″E
Baarschot	Oosterhout	51°35′40″N 4°50′45″E
Baarschot	Deurne	51°26′00″N 5°46′00″E
Babyloniënbroek	Aalburg	51°44′35″N 5°01′20″E
Bakel	Gemert-Bakel	51°30′10″N 5°44′25″E
Bakelsebrug	Gemert-Bakel	51°29′35″N 5°43′00″E
Bakertand	Tilburg	51°32′00″N 5°04′45″E
Balleman	Alphen-Chaam	51°30′35″N 4°45′45″E
Bankert	Gemert-Bakel	51°29′45″N 5°47′40″E
Barlaque	Moerdijk	51°37′25″N 4°29′15″E
Bavel	Breda	51°34′00″N 4°49′50″E
Bedaf	Uden	51°39′40″N 5°34′30″E
Beek en Donk	Laarbeek	51°32′05″N 5°37′50″E
Beemdkant	Laarbeek	51°31′35″N 5°36′00″E
Beers	Cuijk	51°43′30″N 5°49′40″E
Behelp	Asten	51°22′30″N 5°45′30″E
Bekelaar	Geldrop	51°26′45″N 5°38′10″E
Belgeren	Deurne	51°26′25″N 5°44′45″E
Belvert	Haaren	51°36′00″N 5°14′50″E
Bemmer	Laarbeek	51°33′00″N 5°37′25″E
Benedeneind	Lith	51°49′30″N 5°29′10″E
Benthem	Gemert-Bakel	51°29′50″N 5°43′25″E
Berenbroek	Helmond	51°28′00″N 5°36′25″E
Berg	Cranendonck	51°16′35″N 5°32′55″E
Bergeijk	Bergeijk	51°19′10″N 5°21′30″E
Bergen op Zoom	Bergen op Zoom	51°29′40″N 4°17′30″E
Bergenshuizen	Vught	51°37′50″N 5°17′00″E
Berghem	Oss	51°46′15″N 5°34′25″E
Berkeind	Tilburg	51°33′05″N 5°06′55″E
Berkeindje	Someren	51°24′40″N 5°40′35″E
Berkel-Enschot	Tilburg	51°35′05″N 5°08′40″E
Berkhoek	Boekel	51°35′10″N 5°41′05″E
Berkhoek	Tilburg	51°36′10″N 5°09′00″E
Berkt	Veldhoven	51°25′40″N 5°22′45″E
Berkt	Bernheze	51°43′00″N 5°29′50″E
Berlicum	Sint-Michielsgestel	51°40′40″N 5°24′00″E
Besselaar	Sint-Michielsgestel	51°36′55″N 5°22′20″E
Best	Best	51°30′25″N 5°23′25″E
Beugen	Boxmeer	51°40′25″N 5°56′15″E
Beugt	Bernheze	51°38′20″N 5°30′45″E
Beukelaar	Veghel	51°37′00″N 5°33′45″E
Biesthoek	Uden	51°37′40″N 5°39′05″E
Biest-Houtakker	Hilvarenbeek	51°30′25″N 5°09′30″E
Biestraat	Gilze en Rijen	51°32′45″N 4°55′30″E
Biezenheuvel	Bladel	51°24′20″N 5°18′15″E
Biezenmortel	Haaren	51°37′25″N 5°10′40″E
Bijsterveld	Eersel	51°27′05″N 5°21′00″E
Binnen-Moerdijk	Drimmelen	51°42′05″N 4°40′05″E
Bladel	Bladel	51°22′05″N 5°13′15″E
Blauwenhoek	Sint Anthonis	51°36′00″N 5°52′20″E
Blauwe Sluis	Drimmelen	51°41′35″N 4°41′55″E
Blauwe Sluis	Steenbergen	51°35′35″N 4°22′10″E
Bleijs	Deurne	51°28′45″N 5°44′35″E
Boeiink	Roosendaal	51°31′45″N 4°24′55″E
Boekel	Boekel	51°36′10″N 5°40′30″E
Boerdonk	Veghel	51°33′30″N 5°37′30″E
Bokhoven	's-Hertogenbosch	51°44′15″N 5°13′50″E
Boksheide	Eersel	51°19′30″N 5°18′30″E
Bokt	Eindhoven	51°29′25″N 5°30′05″E
Bolberg	Breda	51°33′50″N 4°50′35″E
Bolberg	Gilze en Rijen	51°32′05″N 4°56′05″E
Bolst	Veghel	51°36′25″N 5°36′05″E
Boomen	Someren	51°25′10″N 5°41′35″E
Boompjesdijk	Steenbergen	51°37′20″N 4°19′05″E
Boord	Nuenen, Gerwen en Nederwetten	51°28′10″N 5°31′20″E
Borkel	Valkenswaard	51°17′50″N 5°26′25″E
Borne	Schijndel	51°37′15″N 5°25′00″E
Borneo	Mill en Sint Hubert	51°40′40″N 5°46′30″E
Borteldonk	Roosendaal	51°30′15″N 4°28′00″E
Bosch	Cranendonck	51°16′10″N 5°35′30″E
Boscheind	Bergeijk	51°16′55″N 5°18′25″E
Boschhoven	Baarle-Nassau	51°27′30″N 4°56′20″E
Boschhoven	Heeze-Leende	51°21′20″N 5°32′55″E
Boschkens	Goirle	51°32′00″N 5°03′50″E
Boshoven	Alphen-Chaam	51°27′45″N 4°56′55″E
Boshoven	Bergeijk	51°20′45″N 5°22′40″E
Boskant	Sint-Oedenrode	51°33′00″N 5°25′15″E
Boslust	Alphen-Chaam	51°28′55″N 4°58′30″E
Bosschenhoofd	Halderberge	51°33′40″N 4°32′25″E
Boterwijk	Oirschot	51°30′40″N 5°17′25″E
Boveneind	Lith	51°48′50″N 5°30′40″E
Bovensluis	Moerdijk	51°40′55″N 4°28′35″E
Bovenstehuis	Boekel	51°36′55″N 5°40′45″E
Boxmeer	Boxmeer	51°38′50″N 5°56′50″E
Boxtel	Boxtel	51°35′25″N 5°19′45″E
Braakhoek	Reusel-De Mierden	51°24′15″N 5°10′35″E
Braambosch	Bergeijk	51°20′35″N 5°24′45″E
Brakel	Goirle	51°30′50″N 4°59′55″E
Brand	Landerd	51°41′20″N 5°40′25″E
Breda	Breda	51°35′20″N 4°46′30″E
Breedschot	Zundert	51°30′30″N 4°42′45″E
Breehees	Goirle	51°29′55″N 5°04′05″E
Breemortel	Deurne	51°26′35″N 5°48′40″E
Brem	Tilburg	51°35′50″N 5°08′50″E
Brembosch	Roosendaal	51°29′45″N 4°26′00″E
Breugel	Son en Breugel	51°31′05″N 5°30′40″E
Broek	Laarbeek	51°31′35″N 5°33′35″E
Broekenseind	Bladel	51°23′45″N 5°18′00″E
Broekhoven	Bergeijk	51°21′45″N 5°22′50″E
Broekkant	Someren	51°25′45″N 5°39′00″E
Broekkant	Laarbeek	51°32′10″N 5°39′10″E
Broekkant	Sint Anthonis	51°39′45″N 5°50′05″E
Broekkant	Cranendonck	51°17′00″N 5°35′20″E
Broekzijde	Oisterwijk	51°31′15″N 5°10′40″E
Bronkhorst	Woudrichem	51°46′55″N 5°03′00″E
Bruggen	's-Hertogenbosch	51°43′26″N 5°22′23″E
Bruggen	Mill en Sint Hubert	51°41′55″N 5°46′45″E
Bruggerhuizen	Heeze-Leende	51°19′40″N 5°28′50″E
Budel	Cranendonck	51°16′15″N 5°34′30″E
Budel-Dorplein	Cranendonck	51°14′10″N 5°35′15″E
Budel-Schoot	Cranendonck	51°14′50″N 5°33′55″E
Bulkenaar	Roosendaal	51°30′55″N 4°25′20″E
Burgt	Boekel	51°36′25″N 5°40′50″E
Bus	Veghel	51°35′45″N 5°29′50″E
Bus	Bernheze	51°42′00″N 5°35′30″E
Bussel	Asten	51°25′10″N 5°42′50″E
Buurtje	Werkendam	51°49′30″N 4°55′30″E
Calfven	Woensdrecht	51°24′35″N 4°19′05″E
Castelré	Baarle-Nassau	51°25′25″N 4°47′00″E
Casteren	Bladel	51°23′45″N 5°14′15″E
Chaam	Alphen-Chaam	51°30′20″N 4°51′40″E
Chaamdijk	Alphen-Chaam	51°29′50″N 4°50′20″E
Couwelaar	Alphen-Chaam	51°32′10″N 4°48′25″E
Cranendonck	Cranendonck	51°18′15″N 5°35′20″E
Crèvecoeur	's-Hertogenbosch	51°44′10″N 5°16′00″E
Cromvoirt	Vught	51°39′40″N 5°13′55″E
Croy	Helmond	51°29′45″N 5°37′15″E
Cuijk	Cuijk	51°43′50″N 5°52′45″E
Dalem	Bladel	51°21′10″N 5°15′40″E
Dassemus	Alphen-Chaam	51°30′55″N 4°50′55″E
De Aa	Bergeijk	51°17′00″N 5°21′00″E
De Aa	Boekel	51°35′30″N 5°39′20″E
De Baan	Werkendam	51°43′50″N 4°59′25″E
De Beek	Asten	51°25′05″N 5°43′30″E
De Berg	Mill en Sint Hubert	51°40′10″N 5°49′15″E
De Bergen	Geertruidenberg	51°41′10″N 4°54′00″E
De Berk	Rucphen	51°32′45″N 4°36′20″E
De Berken	Asten	51°25′15″N 5°46′05″E
De Biezen	Laarbeek	51°31′40″N 5°40′05″E
De Bocht	Steenbergen	51°34′25″N 4°20′05″E
De Boer	Mill en Sint Hubert	51°40′10″N 5°48′35″E
De Bolt	Grave	51°44′15″N 5°43′50″E
De Bus	Schijndel	51°38′35″N 5°23′05″E
De Bus	Sint-Oedenrode	51°33′35″N 5°25′15″E
De Dellen	Mill en Sint Hubert	51°41′00″N 5°44′20″E
De Dood	Rucphen	51°31′15″N 4°33′45″E
De Druif	Moerdijk	51°39′15″N 4°32′25″E
De Elft	Grave	51°45′00″N 5°43′50″E
Deelse Kampen	Gemert-Bakel	51°34′10″N 5°41′10″E
Deelshurk	Valkenswaard	51°20′25″N 5°27′00″E
Deense Hoek	Laarbeek	51°30′35″N 5°35′00″E
De Gagel	Mill en Sint Hubert	51°42′20″N 5°45′50″E
De Heen	Steenbergen	51°36′30″N 4°16′15″E
De Hees	Eersel	51°22′25″N 5°20′05″E
De Heiberg	Rucphen	51°30′15″N 4°33′10″E
De Heuvel	Waalre	51°23′30″N 5°25′50″E
De Hoef	Eersel	51°22′50″N 5°17′50″E
De Hoef	Reusel-De Mierden	51°23′00″N 5°11′10″E
De Hoef	Werkendam	51°49′20″N 4°54′40″E
De Hoef	Mill en Sint Hubert	51°40′05″N 5°48′25″E
De Hoef	Someren	51°22′55″N 5°41′35″E
De Hoek	Reusel-De Mierden	51°21′25″N 5°08′40″E
De Hoeven	Heusden	51°42′25″N 5°10′45″E
De Hogert	Sint-Michielsgestel	51°37′25″N 5°21′20″E
De Huften	Someren	51°19′15″N 5°42′00″E
De Hutten	Someren	51°19′15″N 5°42′00″E
De Kampkens	Veghel	51°35′40″N 5°31′00″E
De Kapel	Valkenswaard	51°17′55″N 5°25′45″E
De Kraan	Tilburg	51°35′15″N 5°07′55″E
De Laan	Geertruidenberg	51°41′35″N 4°53′45″E
De Laren	Veghel	51°35′15″N 5°36′25″E
De Lent	Zundert	51°26′30″N 4°38′35″E
De Logt	Oisterwijk	51°32′50″N 5°15′05″E
De Loo	Geldrop	51°26′00″N 5°36′55″E
De Loofaert	Sint-Michielsgestel	51°41′50″N 5°23′30″E
Demen	Oss	51°48′20″N 5°37′55″E
De Moer	Loon op Zand	51°37′25″N 5°00′45″E
De Mortel	Gemert-Bakel	51°32′25″N 5°42′30″E
Den Berg	Boxtel	51°34′40″N 5°21′45″E
Den Dungen	Sint-Michielsgestel	51°39′55″N 5°22′20″E
Den Hoek	Sint Anthonis	51°37′05″N 5°53′10″E
Den Hout	Oosterhout	51°39′25″N 4°48′45″E
Den Opslag	Hilvarenbeek	51°30′30″N 5°11′55″E
De Overval	Steenbergen	51°35′25″N 4°20′30″E
De Pan	Bladel	51°20′50″N 5°16′25″E
De Plaats	Cuijk	51°44′00″N 5°49′00″E
De Posthoorn	Rucphen	51°31′45″N 4°32′30″E
De Rijtjes	Boxmeer	51°42′30″N 5°55′50″E
De Rips	Gemert-Bakel	51°33′00″N 5°48′35″E
De Rotting	Roosendaal	51°32′05″N 4°22′20″E
De Schietbaan	Rucphen	51°31′00″N 4°31′45″E
Deurne	Deurne	51°27′35″N 5°47′50″E
Deursen-Dennenburg	Oss	51°48′05″N 5°37′40″E
Deuteren	's-Hertogenbosch	51°41′15″N 5°16′00″E
De Vleut	Best	51°31′55″N 5°24′30″E
De Voorstad	Deurne	51°23′55″N 5°50′20″E
De Vorst	Boxtel	51°34′15″N 5°19′45″E
De Weijer	Helmond	51°27′25″N 5°42′45″E
De Wind	Gemert-Bakel	51°34′25″N 5°41′05″E
De Wolfsputten	Helmond	51°30′20″N 5°40′30″E
Dieden	Oss	51°49′10″N 5°36′35″E
Diepenbroek	Helmond	51°27′55″N 5°36′15″E
Diessen	Hilvarenbeek	51°28′30″N 5°10′30″E
Dijk	Asten	51°24′55″N 5°42′50″E
Dijk	Veghel	51°35′50″N 5°35′45″E
Dinteloord	Steenbergen	51°38′05″N 4°22′10″E
Dintelsas	Steenbergen	51°39′05″N 4°22′35″E
Dinther	Bernheze	51°38′45″N 5°29′15″E
Dinthersehoek	Bernheze	51°39′20″N 5°32′10″E
Distelberg	Haaren	51°39′30″N 5°13′05″E
Diunt	Breda	51°30′30″N 4°44′50″E
Doeveren	Heusden	51°43′20″N 5°05′15″E
Dommelen	Valkenswaard	51°21′20″N 5°25′50″E
Dommelsvoort	Cuijk	51°44′00″N 5°50′00″E
Dongen	Dongen	51°37′35″N 4°56′20″E
Donk	Eersel	51°25′55″N 5°16′15″E
Donkersvoort	Laarbeek	51°32′20″N 5°35′35″E
Donzel	Bernheze	51°42′55″N 5°32′50″E
Doonheide	Gemert-Bakel	51°34′00″N 5°41′40″E
Doornhoek	Veghel	51°36′05″N 5°32′10″E
Doornhoek	Sint-Michielsgestel	51°40′55″N 5°24′25″E
Dorshout	Veghel	51°37′30″N 5°31′25″E
Dorst	Oosterhout	51°35′25″N 4°51′25″E
Drie Hoefijzers	Moerdijk	51°39′30″N 4°41′35″E
Driehoek	Son en Breugel	51°30′10″N 5°29′50″E
Driehoek	Zundert	51°27′45″N 4°37′30″E
Driehoek	Sint Anthonis	51°36′00″N 5°52′45″E
Driehoek	Moerdijk	51°38′45″N 4°26′15″E
Driehuis	Eersel	51°23′05″N 5°19′25″E
Driehuizen	Veghel	51°38′35″N 5°34′10″E
Driehuizen	Baarle-Nassau	51°27′15″N 4°58′05″E
Driehuizen	Hilvarenbeek	51°30′05″N 5°08′25″E
Driehuizen	Eersel	51°24′50″N 5°17′50″E
Drimmelen	Drimmelen	51°42′25″N 4°48′15″E
Drongelen	Aalburg	51°43′00″N 5°03′15″E
Druisdijk	Alphen-Chaam	51°30′55″N 4°58′45″E
Drunen	Heusden	51°41′10″N 5°08′00″E
Duifhuis	Uden	51°38′20″N 5°35′45″E
Duifhuis	Landerd	51°43′10″N 5°41′00″E
Duiksehoef	Loon op Zand	51°38′25″N 5°02′40″E
Duizel	Eersel	51°22′05″N 5°17′50″E
Duizend Morgen	Woudrichem	51°48′00″N 5°00′35″E
Dun	Hilvarenbeek	51°26′00″N 5°09′40″E
Dussen	Werkendam	51°43′50″N 4°57′45″E
Duurendseind	Oss	51°46′50″N 5°35′10″E
Eeneind	Nuenen, Gerwen en Nederwetten	51°27′05″N 5°32′50″E
Eerde	Veghel	51°36′15″N 5°29′55″E
Eersel	Eersel	51°21′30″N 5°19′05″E
Eethen	Aalburg	51°43′55″N 5°03′10″E
Effen	Breda	51°33′10″N 4°43′45″E
Egypte	Bladel	51°21′30″N 5°13′15″E
Eikberg	Breda	51°33′30″N 4°50′00″E
Eikelenbosch	Baarle-Nassau	51°25′35″N 4°54′00″E
Eikenheuvel	Uden	51°38′20″N 5°36′40″E
Eiland	Woensdrecht	51°25′40″N 4°22′00″E
Eind	Bergeijk	51°21′10″N 5°23′45″E
Eind	Son en Breugel	51°31′15″N 5°31′25″E
Eindhoven	Eindhoven	51°26′25″N 5°28′40″E
Eindje	Someren	51°26′30″N 5°40′15″E
Eind van Den Hout	Oosterhout	51°39′35″N 4°47′25″E
Elde	Schijndel	51°37′00″N 5°24′45″E
Elsendorp	Gemert-Bakel	51°34′50″N 5°46′10″E
Elshout	Heusden	51°42′05″N 5°08′30″E
Elst	Maasdonk	51°44′40″N 5°27′15″E
Empel	's-Hertogenbosch	51°43′50″N 5°19′35″E
Eng	Woudrichem	51°47′00″N 5°00′50″E
Engelen	's-Hertogenbosch	51°43′15″N 5°15′55″E
Erp	Veghel	51°36′00″N 5°36′25″E
Esbeek	Hilvarenbeek	51°27′45″N 5°08′15″E
Esch	Haaren	51°36′40″N 5°17′25″E
Escharen	Grave	51°44′35″N 5°44′45″E
Esdonk	Gemert-Bakel	51°34′55″N 5°40′00″E
Esp	Gemert-Bakel	51°31′10″N 5°43′35″E
Etten-Leur	Etten-Leur	51°34′25″N 4°38′25″E
Euvelwegen	Heeze-Leende	51°21′35″N 5°35′40″E
Evenheuvel	Oirschot	51°31′10″N 5°18′40″E
Everland	Roosendaal	51°29′45″N 4°27′00″E
Everse	Sint-Oedenrode	51°34′20″N 5°29′15″E
Ewinkel	Cuijk	51°44′00″N 5°51′05″E
Fijnaart	Moerdijk	51°38′15″N 4°28′10″E
Fokkershoek	Bernheze	51°39′30″N 5°27′05″E
Franse Hoef	Bladel	51°22′35″N 5°11′55″E
Gaete	Drimmelen	51°42′00″N 4°43′00″E
Galder	Alphen-Chaam	51°30′55″N 4°46′35″E
Gassel	Grave	51°44′30″N 5°46′50″E
Gastel	Cranendonck	51°17′10″N 5°33′20″E
Gastelsveer	Halderberge	51°34′55″N 4°26′05″E
Gebergte	Someren	51°26′00″N 5°39′55″E
Geeneind	Helmond	51°29′40″N 5°36′20″E
Geersbroek	Alphen-Chaam	51°32′25″N 4°49′20″E
Geertruidenberg	Geertruidenberg	51°42′05″N 4°51′25″E
Geffen	Oss	51°44′25″N 5°27′50″E
Geldrop	Geldrop	51°25′20″N 5°33′35″E
Gement	Oss	51°46′50″N 5°34′00″E
Gemert	Gemert-Bakel	51°33′20″N 5°41′25″E
Gemonde	Sint-Michielsgestel	51°37′05″N 5°21′25″E
Genderen	Aalburg	51°44′10″N 5°05′15″E
Geneneind	Gemert-Bakel	51°30′40″N 5°44′00″E
Gennep	Eindhoven	51°25′15″N 5°28′25″E
Genoenhuis	Geldrop	51°24′35″N 5°32′20″E
Gerwen	Nuenen, Gerwen en Nederwetten	51°29′25″N 5°33′45″E
Gever	Haaren	51°35′30″N 5°13′25″E
Gewande	's-Hertogenbosch	51°45′05″N 5°20′55″E
Giessen	Woudrichem	51°47′25″N 5°01′50″E
Gijzel	Haaren	51°37′35″N 5°12′55″E
Gijzenrooi	Geldrop	51°24′40″N 5°31′40″E
Gilze	Gilze en Rijen	51°32′40″N 4°56′25″E
Ginderdoor	Alphen-Chaam	51°30′10″N 4°50′25″E
Ginderdoor	Laarbeek	51°32′00″N 5°34′55″E
Ginderover	Heeze-Leende	51°22′20″N 5°35′05″E
Goor	Geldrop	51°27′15″N 5°38′25″E
Gorp	Hilvarenbeek	51°29′00″N 5°05′00″E
Gorpeind	Baarle-Nassau	51°25′35″N 4°54′15″E
Graspeel	Landerd	51°41′20″N 5°42′00″E
Grave	Grave	51°45′20″N 5°44′15″E
Grazen	Alphen-Chaam	51°29′25″N 4°49′40″E
Groenendijk	Oosterhout	51°38′40″N 4°54′05″E
Groenewoud	Laarbeek	51°31′20″N 5°37′20″E
Groene Woud	Oirschot	51°30′10″N 5°16′55″E
Groeningen	Boxmeer	51°36′30″N 5°59′50″E
Groenstraat	Hilvarenbeek	51°27′25″N 5°08′55″E
Groot-Bedaf	Baarle-Nassau	51°27′05″N 5°00′10″E
Groot Bruggen	Deurne	51°28′40″N 5°45′15″E
Groote Bottel	Deurne	51°27′20″N 5°46′30″E
Groote Hoeven	Someren	51°22′30″N 5°42′20″E
Groot Loo	Hilvarenbeek	51°29′15″N 5°06′50″E
Grotel	Gemert-Bakel	51°31′15″N 5°41′30″E
Grote Voort	Hilvarenbeek	51°30′05″N 5°07′30″E
Haanwijk	Sint-Michielsgestel	51°39′15″N 5°19′25″E
Haaren	Haaren	51°36′10″N 5°13′20″E
Haarsteeg	Heusden	51°42′45″N 5°11′55″E
Haart	Boxmeer	51°41′00″N 5°54′50″E
Haghorst	Hilvarenbeek	51°29′45″N 5°12′25″E
Haiink	Roosendaal	51°30′25″N 4°24′55″E
Hal	Haaren	51°37′50″N 5°18′40″E
Halder	Sint-Michielsgestel	51°38′55″N 5°19′25″E
Halfmijl	Veldhoven	51°25′00″N 5°19′30″E
Halsteren	Bergen op Zoom	51°31′40″N 4°16′30″E
Halte	Deurne	51°26′40″N 5°52′20″E
Ham	Sint Anthonis	51°39′25″N 5°49′45″E
Ham	Veghel	51°35′50″N 5°34′30″E
Handel	Gemert-Bakel	51°34′50″N 5°42′35″E
Hanenberg	Deurne	51°27′00″N 5°49′25″E
Hank	Sint Anthonis	51°39′35″N 5°48′25″E
Hank	Werkendam	51°44′05″N 4°53′50″E
Hapert	Bladel	51°22′05″N 5°15′25″E
Haps	Cuijk	51°41′20″N 5°51′40″E
Haren	Oss	51°48′05″N 5°35′05″E
Haring	Cuijk	51°41′50″N 5°52′05″E
Havelt	Veghel	51°36′15″N 5°33′45″E
Hazelaar	Roosendaal	51°31′30″N 4°22′05″E
Hazelberg	Bernheze	51°38′25″N 5°32′20″E
Hazeldonk	Zundert	51°30′15″N 4°44′05″E
Hazenhurk	Heeze-Leende	51°22′15″N 5°34′05″E
Hazennest	Tilburg	51°35′15″N 5°06′30″E
Hedel	Oirschot	51°31′10″N 5°18′00″E
Hedikhuizen	Heusden	51°44′00″N 5°11′10″E
Heensche Molen	Steenbergen	51°36′10″N 4°14′45″E
Heereind	Laarbeek	51°32′20″N 5°37′00″E
Heerendonk	Nuenen, Gerwen en Nederwetten	51°30′00″N 5°31′15″E
Heerle	Roosendaal	51°31′10″N 4°21′35″E
Heers	Veldhoven	51°23′40″N 5°24′00″E
Heerstaaien	Alphen-Chaam	51°31′10″N 4°47′30″E
Heesakker	Haaren	51°36′40″N 5°15′30″E
Heesbeen	Heusden	51°43′15″N 5°07′15″E
Heesboom	Baarle-Nassau	51°26′15″N 4°53′30″E
Heesch	Bernheze	51°44′00″N 5°31′45″E
Heeseind	Maasdonk	51°43′40″N 5°25′25″E
Heeswijk	Bernheze	51°39′05″N 5°28′30″E
Heeswijk	Cuijk	51°44′10″N 5°51′15″E
Heeze	Heeze-Leende	51°23′00″N 5°34′20″E
Heezerenbosch	Heeze-Leende	51°22′25″N 5°33′05″E
Heiderschoor	Geldrop	51°27′05″N 5°35′05″E
Heidveld	Gemert-Bakel	51°29′10″N 5°44′15″E
Heieind	Deurne	51°26′30″N 5°46′55″E
Heieind	Bladel	51°24′25″N 5°15′10″E
Heieind	Someren	51°25′05″N 5°40′15″E
Heiereind	Bergeijk	51°21′00″N 5°23′50″E
Heihoefke	Bergen op Zoom	51°28′00″N 4°20′00″E
Heihoek	Grave	51°43′50″N 5°47′15″E
Heijbeek	Roosendaal	51°28′55″N 4°28′50″E
Heijningen	Moerdijk	51°39′20″N 4°24′30″E
Heikant	Boxmeer	51°35′00″N 5°57′15″E
Heikant	Bladel	51°23′35″N 5°17′25″E
Heikant	Tilburg	51°35′40″N 5°09′35″E
Heikant	Someren	51°22′35″N 5°41′05″E
Heikant	Baarle-Nassau	51°26′55″N 4°57′50″E
Heikant	Cranendonck	51°15′40″N 5°35′00″E
Heikant	Reusel-De Mierden	51°23′45″N 5°10′55″E
Heikant	Waalre	51°22′35″N 5°26′50″E
Heikant	Uden	51°38′05″N 5°40′15″E
Heikant	Alphen-Chaam	51°30′55″N 4°52′20″E
Heikant	Tilburg	51°33′40″N 4°58′30″E
Heikant	Sint Anthonis	51°35′50″N 5°52′25″E
Heikant	Laarbeek	51°30′35″N 5°40′25″E
Heikant	Oisterwijk	51°32′55″N 5°13′15″E
Heikant	Oosterhout	51°38′10″N 4°53′10″E
Heikant	Boxmeer	51°37′40″N 5°57′10″E
Heikant	Baarle-Nassau	51°27′15″N 4°50′45″E
Heikant	Hilvarenbeek	51°26′50″N 5°11′05″E
Heikantse Hoeve	Sint-Michielsgestel	51°40′35″N 5°26′45″E
Heiligeboom	Oisterwijk	51°32′40″N 5°12′20″E
Heimolen	Bergen op Zoom	51°28′10″N 4°19′20″E
Heimolen	Deurne	51°26′15″N 5°47′25″E
Heische Wal	Bernheze	51°39′30″N 5°31′30″E
Heistraat	Oosterhout	51°38′20″N 4°53′50″E
Heistraat	Eindhoven	51°26′15″N 5°24′35″E
Heitrak	Deurne	51°22′50″N 5°51′30″E
Helbroek	Boxmeer	51°40′50″N 5°56′15″E
Helenaveen	Deurne	51°23′25″N 5°55′00″E
Helkant	Drimmelen	51°40′30″N 4°45′15″E
Hellegat	Zundert	51°32′10″N 4°41′30″E
Helleneind	Bladel	51°22′15″N 5°12′45″E
Helmond	Helmond	51°28′55″N 5°39′40″E
Helvoirt	Haaren	51°37′55″N 5°13′50″E
Helwijk	Moerdijk	51°40′35″N 4°25′55″E
Hengstheuvel	Uden	51°40′40″N 5°36′30″E
Hermalen	Schijndel	51°36′35″N 5°24′10″E
Herpen	Oss	51°46′20″N 5°38′30″E
Herpt	Heusden	51°43′45″N 5°09′20″E
Hersel	Someren	51°26′15″N 5°40′15″E
Hersend	Sint-Michielsgestel	51°40′10″N 5°23′50″E
Hespelaar	Oosterhout	51°39′55″N 4°48′40″E
Het Bosch	Bladel	51°23′25″N 5°13′10″E
Het Broek	Geldrop	51°27′15″N 5°35′35″E
Het Goordonk	Baarle-Nassau	51°27′10″N 4°54′30″E
Het Heike	Eersel	51°25′30″N 5°16′55″E
Het Hoekske	Rucphen	51°30′50″N 4°30′05″E
Het Hool	Laarbeek	51°31′10″N 5°36′35″E
Het Laar	Laarbeek	51°31′10″N 5°37′25″E
Het Oosteind	Rucphen	51°32′25″N 4°37′40″E
Het Sas	Alphen-Chaam	51°28′10″N 4°59′05″E
Het Wild	Lith	51°45′55″N 5°22′00″E
Het Zand	Drimmelen	51°38′10″N 4°46′05″E
Heukelom	Oisterwijk	51°34′35″N 5°09′25″E
Heusden	Heusden	51°44′05″N 5°08′20″E
Heusden	Asten	51°23′05″N 5°45′50″E
Heuvel	Veghel	51°36′35″N 5°33′55″E
Heuvel	Valkenswaard	51°18′25″N 5°24′35″E
Heuvel	Bladel	51°23′40″N 5°17′10″E
Heuvelberg	Veghel	51°35′30″N 5°37′35″E
Heuvelstraat	Oisterwijk	51°31′00″N 5°09′35″E
Heuveltje	Tilburg	51°35′50″N 5°08′20″E
Hezelaar	Sint-Michielsgestel	51°38′05″N 5°22′05″E
Hezelaar	Boxtel	51°34′05″N 5°23′30″E
Hilakker	Gemert-Bakel	51°29′20″N 5°44′35″E
Hild	Oisterwijk	51°32′20″N 5°11′50″E
Hill	Aalburg	51°44′55″N 4°59′35″E
Hilvarenbeek	Hilvarenbeek	51°29′10″N 5°08′15″E
Hoefkens	Landerd	51°43′05″N 5°41′45″E
Hoek	Sint-Michielsgestel	51°39′50″N 5°23′35″E
Hoek	Veghel	51°35′45″N 5°37′50″E
Hoek	Valkenswaard	51°18′25″N 5°25′35″E
Hoekdries	Eersel	51°23′40″N 5°19′55″E
Hoekeinde	Werkendam	51°49′00″N 4°57′40″E
Hoekske	Moerdijk	51°41′20″N 4°39′15″E
Hoeve	Valkenswaard	51°17′35″N 5°25′40″E
Hoeven	Gemert-Bakel	51°29′55″N 5°47′35″E
Hoeven	Sint Anthonis	51°39′05″N 5°48′40″E
Hoeven	Halderberge	51°34′45″N 4°35′00″E
Hoeves	Schijndel	51°36′40″N 5°29′00″E
Hoevestein	Roosendaal	51°29′05″N 4°24′45″E
Hollandsdiep	Roosendaal	51°28′20″N 4°27′10″E
Holthees	Boxmeer	51°34′30″N 6°00′20″E
Hommelse Hoeven	Bernheze	51°39′40″N 5°30′05″E
Hondseind	Alphen-Chaam	51°28′25″N 4°58′40″E
Hoogcasteren	Bladel	51°24′15″N 5°17′40″E
Hooge Aard	Gilze en Rijen	51°33′05″N 4°52′05″E
Hooge Berkt	Bergeijk	51°19′35″N 5°20′20″E
Hoogebiezen	Veghel	51°35′25″N 5°31′25″E
Hooge Heide	Landerd	51°44′15″N 5°36′15″E
Hoogeind	Boxmeer	51°39′30″N 5°54′00″E
Hoogeind	Baarle-Nassau	51°26′05″N 4°54′00″E
Hoogeind	Oirschot	51°27′50″N 5°16′35″E
Hoogeind	Hilvarenbeek	51°27′00″N 5°08′10″E
Hoogeind	Boxmeer	51°41′45″N 5°56′35″E
Hoogeloon	Bladel	51°23′50″N 5°16′05″E
Hooge Mierde	Reusel-De Mierden	51°23′15″N 5°07′45″E
Hoogen-Aarle	Gemert-Bakel	51°31′50″N 5°43′10″E
Hoogerheide	Woensdrecht	51°25′25″N 4°19′30″E
Hooge Wijst	Bernheze	51°43′20″N 5°32′30″E
Hooge Zwaluwe	Drimmelen	51°41′15″N 4°44′40″E
Hooghout	Haaren	51°37′05″N 5°11′50″E
Hoog Spul	Hilvarenbeek	51°28′40″N 5°07′40″E
Hoogstraat	Eersel	51°21′20″N 5°20′05″E
Hoogveld	Uden	51°39′30″N 5°40′05″E
Hooidonk	Son en Breugel	51°30′00″N 5°30′45″E
Hool	Nuenen, Gerwen en Nederwetten	51°29′30″N 5°33′05″E
Horst	Gilze en Rijen	51°32′20″N 4°55′40″E
Horzik	Sint-Michielsgestel	51°39′50″N 5°21′30″E
Hout	Geldrop	51°24′30″N 5°33′35″E
Houtens	Son en Breugel	51°30′25″N 5°28′30″E
Houterd	Schijndel	51°38′35″N 5°26′25″E
Houtgoor	Alphen-Chaam	51°29′35″N 4°51′40″E
Hugten	Cranendonck	51°19′10″N 5°39′40″E
Huij	Cuijk	51°42′25″N 5°54′05″E
Huijbergen	Woensdrecht	51°25′55″N 4°22′35″E
Huisseling	Oss	51°47′15″N 5°38′20″E
Huisvennen	Baarle-Nassau	51°27′55″N 4°54′30″E
Huize Padua	Boekel	51°35′20″N 5°42′10″E
Hulsbeek	Sint Anthonis	51°39′15″N 5°50′40″E
Hulsdonk	Zundert	51°28′25″N 4°36′55″E
Hulsel	Reusel-De Mierden	51°23′20″N 5°10′40″E
Hulten	Gilze en Rijen	51°34′20″N 4°57′15″E
Hultje	Uden	51°40′45″N 5°37′50″E
Hurkske	Veghel	51°35′10″N 5°37′10″E
Huygevoort	Oirschot	51°27′55″N 5°13′45″E
IJpelaar	Breda	51°34′40″N 4°48′55″E
Kaarschot	Zundert	51°31′15″N 4°43′25″E
Kaathoven	's-Hertogenbosch	51°41′40″N 5°27′10″E
Kaatsheuvel	Loon op Zand	51°39′25″N 5°02′05″E
Kade	Moerdijk	51°37′50″N 4°29′05″E
Kalishoek	Alphen-Chaam	51°31′20″N 4°52′15″E
Kameren	Bernheze	51°39′40″N 5°26′15″E
Kantje	Bernheze	51°41′50″N 5°33′25″E
Kapeleind	Schijndel	51°37′05″N 5°27′35″E
Karstraat	Laarbeek	51°32′30″N 5°36′30″E
Kasteren	Boxtel	51°34′55″N 5°22′05″E
Kattenberg	Oirschot	51°31′15″N 5°15′10″E
Kattenbosch	Reusel-De Mierden	51°22′00″N 5°08′50″E
Katwijk	Cuijk	51°45′00″N 5°52′15″E
Kaweide	Gemert-Bakel	51°29′35″N 5°46′00″E
Keent	Oss	51°46′15″N 5°41′45″E
Keizershoek	Baarle-Nassau	51°26′35″N 4°57′15″E
Keldonk	Veghel	51°35′15″N 5°35′05″E
Kerkeind	Haaren	51°35′50″N 5°12′50″E
Kerkeind	Deurne	51°28′10″N 5°47′15″E
Kerkeind	Sint-Michielsgestel	51°37′15″N 5°21′00″E
Kerkeinde	Werkendam	51°49′25″N 4°56′05″E
Kerkhof	Heeze-Leende	51°22′15″N 5°33′30″E
Keske	Son en Breugel	51°30′50″N 5°30′50″E
Kessel	Lith	51°48′15″N 5°24′10″E
Keunenhoek	Cranendonck	51°17′10″N 5°35′05″E
Kievitswaard	Werkendam	51°47′35″N 4°49′20″E
Kijkuit	Bergen op Zoom	51°32′20″N 4°15′30″E
Kille	Werkendam	51°46′45″N 4°54′40″E
Kinderbos	Boxtel	51°33′45″N 5°18′55″E
Kippereind	Reusel-De Mierden	51°20′55″N 5°09′55″E
Kivitsbraak	Gemert-Bakel	51°31′30″N 5°42′50″E
Kladde	Bergen op Zoom	51°33′40″N 4°15′55″E
Klef	Gemert-Bakel	51°30′40″N 5°47′55″E
Klein-Bedaf	Baarle-Nassau	51°27′15″N 4°58′45″E
Klein Bruggen	Deurne	51°28′30″N 5°45′50″E
Kleinder-Liempde	Boxtel	51°34′20″N 5°20′15″E
Klein-Dongen	Dongen	51°38′40″N 4°57′00″E
Kleine Bottel	Deurne	51°27′40″N 5°46′20″E
Kleine Koolwijk	Oss	51°46′30″N 5°35′40″E
Kleine Voort	Hilvarenbeek	51°30′00″N 5°07′50″E
Klein Loo	Hilvarenbeek	51°29′05″N 5°07′25″E
Klein-Oekel	Zundert	51°30′10″N 4°43′05″E
Klein-Schoot	Cranendonck	51°15′15″N 5°34′30″E
Klein-Vortum	Boxmeer	51°37′10″N 5°59′25″E
Klein-Zundert	Zundert	51°28′50″N 4°39′15″E
Kleuter	Uden	51°39′35″N 5°39′00″E
Klooster	Alphen-Chaam	51°31′40″N 4°51′40″E
Kloostereind	Helmond	51°27′15″N 5°42′15″E
Klundert	Moerdijk	51°39′55″N 4°32′05″E
Klutsdorp	Bergen op Zoom	51°33′10″N 4°17′40″E
Knegsel	Eersel	51°23′55″N 5°20′45″E
Koevering	Steenbergen	51°34′35″N 4°16′05″E
Koevering	Sint-Oedenrode	51°34′55″N 5°29′35″E
Koks	Gemert-Bakel	51°34′25″N 5°39′30″E
Koningshoeven	Tilburg	51°33′00″N 5°06′45″E
Kooldert	Uden	51°38′05″N 5°37′15″E
Koolwijk, North Brabant	Oss	51°46′10″N 5°36′25″E
Korn	Werkendam	51°44′55″N 4°57′15″E
Kouwenberg	Tilburg	51°35′50″N 5°05′20″E
Kraanmeer	Veghel	51°37′40″N 5°36′35″E
Kraanven	Loon op Zand	51°37′50″N 5°02′50″E
Kranenbroek	Helmond	51°27′40″N 5°35′50″E
Kreek	Moerdijk	51°37′35″N 4°30′35″E
Kreiel	Eersel	51°26′20″N 5°19′00″E
Kreijl	Heeze-Leende	51°23′40″N 5°33′50″E
Kreitsberg	Landerd	51°42′40″N 5°41′00″E
Kremselen	Sint-Oedenrode	51°33′25″N 5°25′35″E
Krolhoek	Boxmeer	51°41′30″N 5°55′25″E
Kruisland	Steenbergen	51°34′10″N 4°24′35″E
Kruisschot	Helmond	51°29′15″N 5°41′05″E
Kruisschot	Helmond	51°29′55″N 5°36′15″E
Kruisstraat	Roosendaal	51°30′40″N 4°27′55″E
Kruisstraat	's-Hertogenbosch	51°43′55″N 5°23′40″E
Kruisstraat	Halderberge	51°35′15″N 4°34′05″E
Kuiksche Heide	Heusden	51°41′30″N 5°09′40″E
Kuikseind	Oirschot	51°27′35″N 5°15′25″E
Kuilenrode	Reusel-De Mierden	51°23′55″N 5°08′00″E
Kuivezand	Halderberge	51°35′20″N 4°30′20″E
Kulert	Deurne	51°27′45″N 5°49′20″E
Kuundert	Gemert-Bakel	51°29′20″N 5°44′50″E
Kwaalburg	Alphen-Chaam	51°28′35″N 4°56′30″E
Kwartier	Moerdijk	51°37′50″N 4°26′00″E
Laageind	Boxmeer	51°39′55″N 5°52′10″E
Laag-Heukelom	Oisterwijk	51°34′00″N 5°08′40″E
Laag Spul	Hilvarenbeek	51°28′40″N 5°08′35″E
Laagstraat	Dongen	51°38′15″N 4°55′10″E
Laar	Cranendonck	51°18′05″N 5°36′40″E
Laar	Nuenen, Gerwen en Nederwetten	51°29′35″N 5°33′15″E
Laar	Haaren	51°38′00″N 5°12′00″E
Laar	Sint-Michielsgestel	51°40′25″N 5°25′30″E
Laarbroek	Asten	51°24′50″N 5°44′10″E
Lage Aard	Breda	51°33′40″N 4°51′55″E
Lage Berkt	Bergeijk	51°19′00″N 5°19′35″E
Lagebiezen	Veghel	51°35′35″N 5°31′55″E
Lageheide	Grave	51°43′30″N 5°43′30″E
Lagekant	Maasdonk	51°44′00″N 5°27′00″E
Lage Mierde	Reusel-De Mierden	51°24′20″N 5°08′50″E
Lagenheuvel	Uden	51°38′50″N 5°40′05″E
Lage Wijst	Bernheze	51°43′25″N 5°31′05″E
Lage Zwaluwe	Drimmelen	51°42′30″N 4°42′15″E
L'Air Pur	Baarle-Nassau	51°25′10″N 4°56′15″E
Lamperen	Sint Anthonis	51°38′45″N 5°50′20″E
Landhorst	Sint Anthonis	51°37′05″N 5°47′30″E
Landorp	Bladel	51°23′05″N 5°16′10″E
Land van Kleef	Loon op Zand	51°38′00″N 5°04′45″E
Langenberg	Boxtel	51°36′00″N 5°21′00″E
Langenboom	Mill en Sint Hubert	51°42′15″N 5°43′50″E
Langendijk	Rucphen	51°31′00″N 4°30′45″E
Langereit	Gilze en Rijen	51°32′20″N 4°54′25″E
Langeschouw	Rucphen	51°28′55″N 4°32′25″E
Langeweg	Moerdijk	51°38′55″N 4°39′55″E
Langlaar	Nuenen, Gerwen en Nederwetten	51°29′00″N 5°33′15″E
Lankes	Uden	51°39′05″N 5°39′25″E
Ledeacker	Sint Anthonis	51°38′10″N 5°52′15″E
Leemberg	Woensdrecht	51°23′15″N 4°20′10″E
Leende	Heeze-Leende	51°21′00″N 5°33′15″E
Leenderstrijp	Heeze-Leende	51°20′00″N 5°32′25″E
Leensel	Deurne	51°24′30″N 5°48′20″E
Leg	Alphen-Chaam	51°29′55″N 4°51′35″E
Lennisheuvel	Boxtel	51°34′20″N 5°18′55″E
Lepelstraat	Bergen op Zoom	51°32′55″N 4°16′35″E
Leurke	Boekel	51°35′30″N 5°40′25″E
Liefkenshoek	Baarle-Nassau	51°25′55″N 4°57′15″E
Liempde	Boxtel	51°34′10″N 5°22′20″E
Lierop	Someren	51°25′10″N 5°40′45″E
Lies	Breda	51°34′10″N 4°42′40″E
Lieseind	Schijndel	51°38′30″N 5°24′15″E
Lieshout	Laarbeek	51°32′15″N 5°35′40″E
Liessel	Deurne	51°24′50″N 5°49′15″E
Lieveld	Oirschot	51°30′50″N 5°16′45″E
Lijndonk	Breda	51°34′10″N 4°51′30″E
Linden	Cuijk	51°44′55″N 5°49′50″E
Lith	Lith	51°48′20″N 5°26′20″E
Lithoijen	Lith	51°48′10″N 5°27′50″E
Locht	Cranendonck	51°14′35″N 5°33′35″E
Lochtenburg	Moerdijk	51°41′05″N 4°37′15″E
Loeswijk	Geldrop	51°26′35″N 5°37′50″E
Loo	Bernheze	51°42′25″N 5°34′35″E
Loo	Bergeijk	51°18′30″N 5°20′15″E
Loo	Uden	51°40′15″N 5°35′30″E
Looieind	Veghel	51°36′35″N 5°37′05″E
Looienhoek	Goirle	51°31′00″N 5°00′30″E
Loon	Waalre	51°22′45″N 5°26′25″E
Looneind	Alphen-Chaam	51°29′30″N 4°58′55″E
Loon op Zand	Loon op Zand	51°37′40″N 5°04′30″E
Loonse Hoek	Tilburg	51°37′50″N 5°06′25″E
Loons Hoekje	Loon op Zand	51°39′55″N 5°04′30″E
Loosbroek	Bernheze	51°40′45″N 5°30′25″E
Loveren	Bergeijk	51°20′15″N 5°24′30″E
Loveren	Vught	51°39′15″N 5°14′10″E
Loveren	Baarle-Nassau	51°26′50″N 4°54′35″E
Luchen	Geldrop	51°26′40″N 5°36′05″E
Luissel	Boxtel	51°35′25″N 5°15′30″E
Luitert	Zundert	51°29′15″N 4°39′30″E
Luyksgestel	Bergeijk	51°17′20″N 5°19′25″E
Maaijkant	Baarle-Nassau	51°27′50″N 4°52′10″E
Maalbergen	Zundert	51°26′20″N 4°39′35″E
Maarheeze	Cranendonck	51°18′45″N 5°37′00″E
Maashees	Boxmeer	51°34′15″N 6°01′55″E
Maaskant	Eersel	51°25′05″N 5°18′05″E
Maaskantje	Sint-Michielsgestel	51°39′30″N 5°22′15″E
Maatsehei	Uden	51°37′55″N 5°39′00″E
Macharen	Oss	51°48′20″N 5°32′40″E
Made	Drimmelen	51°40′35″N 4°47′35″E
Maren	Lith	51°47′40″N 5°22′50″E
Maren-Kessel	Lith	51°47′45″N 5°23′35″E
Mariaheide	Veghel	51°38′00″N 5°34′50″E
Mariahout	Laarbeek	51°32′30″N 5°34′20″E
Mathijseind	Gemert-Bakel	51°29′55″N 5°43′00″E
Medevoort	Helmond	51°28′00″N 5°37′05″E
Meemortel	Cranendonck	51°16′05″N 5°35′00″E
Meer	Eersel	51°22′15″N 5°18′45″E
Meeren	Mill en Sint Hubert	51°41′15″N 5°45′20″E
Meerven	Eersel	51°26′25″N 5°16′00″E
Meeuwen	Aalburg	51°43′45″N 5°00′40″E
Megen	Oss	51°49′20″N 5°33′45″E
Meijldoorn	Schijndel	51°38′30″N 5°22′45″E
Meijsberg	Alphen-Chaam	51°30′00″N 4°52′25″E
Menzel	Bernheze	51°41′45″N 5°34′55″E
Merlenberg	Deurne	51°27′30″N 5°49′30″E
Midbuul	Cranendonck	51°15′45″N 5°34′25″E
Middelbeers	Oirschot	51°28′00″N 5°15′00″E
Middelrode	Sint-Michielsgestel	51°39′50″N 5°25′10″E
Mierlo	Geldrop	51°26′25″N 5°37′10″E
Milheeze	Gemert-Bakel	51°30′05″N 5°46′45″E
Mill	Mill en Sint Hubert	51°41′15″N 5°46′45″E
Milschot	Gemert-Bakel	51°31′50″N 5°42′00″E
Mispeleind	Reusel-De Mierden	51°24′25″N 5°09′40″E
Moerdijk	Moerdijk	51°42′05″N 4°37′35″E
Moeren	Zundert	51°29′05″N 4°36′40″E
Moerenbrug	Tilburg	51°33′35″N 5°06′55″E
Moergestel	Oisterwijk	51°32′40″N 5°10′40″E
Moerstraten	Roosendaal	51°32′25″N 4°20′30″E
Moleneind	Aalburg	51°47′00″N 5°06′00″E
Moleneind	Loon op Zand	51°36′55″N 5°05′40″E
Moleneind	Uden	51°39′30″N 5°35′35″E
Molengat	Mill en Sint Hubert	51°40′45″N 5°47′30″E
Molenhof	Deurne	51°29′05″N 5°44′30″E
Molenschot	Gilze en Rijen	51°34′20″N 4°52′55″E
Molenstraat	Haaren	51°37′15″N 5°14′20″E
Molenstraat	Loon op Zand	51°37′20″N 5°06′00″E
Molenveld	Eersel	51°21′45″N 5°20′45″E
Molenwijk	Boekel	51°37′05″N 5°40′00″E
Moorsel	Someren	51°24′55″N 5°39′10″E
Morsche Hoef	Veghel	51°36′35″N 5°36′40″E
Mosbulten	Sint-Oedenrode	51°31′40″N 5°31′35″E
Mosik	Eersel	51°22′15″N 5°17′10″E
Mostheuvel	Eersel	51°27′10″N 5°20′00″E
Muggenberg	Heeze-Leende	51°22′55″N 5°33′30″E
Muggenhol	Veldhoven	51°26′00″N 5°24′35″E
Muggenhool	Bergeijk	51°18′45″N 5°19′30″E
Muizenhol	Gemert-Bakel	51°30′20″N 5°42′45″E
Mun	Landerd	51°44′05″N 5°35′30″E
Munnekens-Vinkel	Maasdonk	51°42′30″N 5°29′40″E
Munnikenheide	Rucphen	51°32′50″N 4°36′50″E
Nabbegat	Landerd	51°42′40″N 5°39′30″E
Nederheide	Rucphen	51°30′00″N 4°30′30″E
Nederwetten	Nuenen, Gerwen en Nederwetten	51°29′30″N 5°31′25″E
Neerbroek	Boekel	51°36′35″N 5°39′50″E
Neerkant	Deurne	51°22′05″N 5°52′00″E
Neerlangel	Oss	51°48′30″N 5°38′45″E
Neerloon	Oss	51°47′15″N 5°40′35″E
Neerstraat	Gemert-Bakel	51°30′55″N 5°43′30″E
Nergena	Boxtel	51°36′00″N 5°17′45″E
Nerhoven	Gilze en Rijen	51°33′10″N 4°56′55″E
Netersel	Bladel	51°24′15″N 5°12′30″E
Niemeskant	Uden	51°38′30″N 5°38′25″E
Nieuw Acht	Eindhoven	51°28′05″N 5°24′25″E
Nieuwe Dijk	Nuenen, Gerwen en Nederwetten	51°30′10″N 5°32′45″E
Nieuwemolen	Moerdijk	51°38′05″N 4°27′40″E
Nieuwe Molen	Bergen op Zoom	51°31′05″N 4°16′35″E
Nieuwenberg	Roosendaal	51°33′35″N 4°29′00″E
Nieuwendijk	Werkendam	51°46′30″N 4°55′15″E
Nieuwe Strumpt	Baarle-Nassau	51°26′25″N 4°50′55″E
Nieuw-Gassel	Grave	51°44′00″N 5°46′10″E
Nieuwkerk	Goirle	51°29′15″N 5°02′15″E
Nieuwkuijk	Heusden	51°41′25″N 5°10′55″E
Nieuw-Vossemeer	Steenbergen	51°35′25″N 4°13′05″E
Nijhoven	Baarle-Nassau	51°26′20″N 4°57′15″E
Nijnsel	Sint-Oedenrode	51°33′05″N 5°29′00″E
Nijvelaar	Sint-Michielsgestel	51°40′55″N 5°22′30″E
Nispen	Roosendaal	51°29′05″N 4°27′30″E
Nispense Achterhoek	Rucphen	51°29′00″N 4°29′40″E
Nistelrode	Bernheze	51°42′15″N 5°33′45″E
Noenes	Haaren	51°36′45″N 5°14′45″E
Noord	Sint Anthonis	51°39′15″N 5°48′25″E
Noordhoek	Rucphen	51°34′00″N 4°31′00″E
Noordhoek	Moerdijk	51°38′35″N 4°31′55″E
Noordkant	Sint Anthonis	51°38′20″N 5°53′50″E
Noordschans	Moerdijk	51°40′40″N 4°31′25″E
Notendaal	Steenbergen	51°35′15″N 4°14′50″E
Notsel	Alphen-Chaam	51°31′55″N 4°47′30″E
Nuenen	Nuenen, Gerwen en Nederwetten	51°28′15″N 5°33′10″E
Nuijeneind	Gemert-Bakel	51°30′25″N 5°43′00″E
Nuland	's-Hertogenbosch	51°43′30″N 5°26′05″E
Odiliapeel	Uden	51°38′35″N 5°42′20″E
Oeffelt	Boxmeer	51°41′55″N 5°56′00″E
Oeijenbraak	Someren	51°25′20″N 5°40′05″E
Oekel	Zundert	51°29′30″N 4°42′45″E
Oetelaar	Schijndel	51°37′30″N 5°24′00″E
Oijen	Lith	51°49′30″N 5°30′10″E
Oirschot	Oirschot	51°30′20″N 5°18′50″E
Oisterwijk	Oisterwijk	51°34′45″N 5°11′20″E
Oisterwijkse Hoeven	Oisterwijk	51°33′45″N 5°10′00″E
Olen	Son en Breugel	51°31′05″N 5°32′10″E
Olland	Sint-Oedenrode	51°34′50″N 5°24′25″E
Ommel	Asten	51°25′25″N 5°44′55″E
Onsenoort	Heusden	51°42′05″N 5°10′35″E
Oostappen	Asten	51°26′10″N 5°43′00″E
Oosteind	Waalwijk	51°40′15″N 5°03′25″E
Oostelbeers	Oirschot	51°19′10″N 5°16′10″E
Oosterens	Uden	51°38′35″N 5°40′15″E
Oosterhout	Oosterhout	51°38′45″N 4°51′35″E
Oosterik	Heeze-Leende	51°21′20″N 5°33′45″E
Oostlaar	Roosendaal	51°30′45″N 4°23′40″E
Op den Bosch	Boxmeer	51°35′00″N 6°01′15″E
Oploo	Sint Anthonis	51°36′30″N 5°52′25″E
Opwetten	Nuenen, Gerwen en Nederwetten	51°27′35″N 5°31′50″E
Oranjeoord	Moerdijk	51°39′50″N 4°26′45″E
Oss	Oss	51°45′55″N 5°31′05″E
Ossendrecht	Woensdrecht	51°23′40″N 4°19′35″E
Ostaaijen	Zundert	51°26′50″N 4°36′10″E
Otterdijk	Someren	51°24′40″N 5°41′30″E
Oud-Drimmelen	Drimmelen	51°41′50″N 4°46′35″E
Oudemolen	Moerdijk	51°39′00″N 4°28′00″E
Oude Molen	Bergen op Zoom	51°32′15″N 4°17′00″E
Oud-Empel	's-Hertogenbosch	51°44′10″N 5°18′10″E
Oudenbosch	Halderberge	51°35′20″N 4°32′05″E
Oudendijk	Woudrichem	51°48′35″N 4°58′50″E
Oudenmolen	Heeze-Leende	51°22′40″N 5°33′45″E
Oude Strumpt	Baarle-Nassau	51°26′30″N 4°50′10″E
Oude Waranda	Boxmeer	51°38′10″N 5°58′15″E
Oud Gastel	Halderberge	51°35′15″N 4°27′35″E
Oud-Heusden	Heusden	51°43′25″N 5°08′25″E
Oventje	Landerd	51°40′40″N 5°40′30″E
Overa	Breda	51°32′30″N 4°44′45″E
Overakker	Geldrop	51°26′05″N 5°37′35″E
Overberg	Woensdrecht	51°26′30″N 4°22′20″E
Overbrug	Helmond	51°29′45″N 5°38′30″E
Overlangel	Oss	51°46′30″N 5°40′15″E
Overloon	Boxmeer	51°34′15″N 5°56′50″E
Overschot	Gemert-Bakel	51°29′55″N 5°44′55″E
Pandelaarse Kampen	Gemert-Bakel	51°33′50″N 5°39′55″E
Pandgat	Oirschot	51°31′05″N 5°16′55″E
Pannenschop	Deurne	51°26′45″N 5°50′00″E
Papenvoort	Sint Anthonis	51°38′55″N 5°52′10″E
Park	Sint Anthonis	51°38′30″N 5°49′30″E
Peeldijk	Laarbeek	51°31′50″N 5°38′50″E
Peelkant	Sint Anthonis	51°37′05″N 5°51′50″E
Peelsehuis	Boekel	51°37′30″N 5°40′10″E
Peelstraat	Sint Anthonis	51°38′55″N 5°49′30″E
Peelstraat	Boekel	51°35′30″N 5°40′50″E
Peerenboom	Werkendam	51°43′20″N 4°54′50″E
Pelikaan	Moerdijk	51°38′45″N 4°34′05″E
Plaatsluis	Woensdrecht	51°22′40″N 4°20′00″E
Plantage Centrum	Roosendaal	51°27′45″N 4°22′30″E
Plein	Sint-Michielsgestel	51°40′45″N 5°25′20″E
Plein	Sint-Michielsgestel	51°39′30″N 5°20′15″E
Poeldonk	Sint-Michielsgestel	51°40′45″N 5°22′00″E
Polsdonken	Oirschot	51°31′25″N 5°17′35″E
Prinsenbeek	Breda	51°35′55″N 4°42′45″E
Putselaar	Cuijk	51°41′00″N 5°51′35″E
Putte	Woensdrecht	51°21′35″N 4°23′45″E
Quirijnstok	Tilburg	51°35′50″N 5°06′10″E
Raakeind	Gilze en Rijen	51°32′45″N 4°53′50″E
Raam	Haaren	51°37′05″N 5°13′15″E
Raamberg	Zundert	51°29′55″N 4°40′10″E
Raamsdonk	Geertruidenberg	51°41′15″N 4°54′30″E
Raamsdonksveer	Geertruidenberg	51°41′50″N 4°52′25″E
Rakens	Alphen-Chaam	51°32′00″N 4°49′05″E
Rakt	Uden	51°40′35″N 5°34′55″E
Ravensgat	Gemert-Bakel	51°29′30″N 5°43′30″E
Ravenstein	Oss	51°47′45″N 5°39′00″E
Reek	Landerd	51°44′45″N 5°40′55″E
Ren	Gemert-Bakel	51°32′10″N 5°42′15″E
Reth	Baarle-Nassau	51°26′00″N 4°56′50″E
Reusel	Reusel-De Mierden	51°21′45″N 5°09′55″E
Reuth	Baarle-Nassau	51°26′40″N 4°53′55″E
Riel	Eindhoven	51°25′25″N 5°31′20″E
Riel	Goirle	51°31′30″N 5°01′25″E
Riethoven	Bergeijk	51°21′15″N 5°23′15″E
Rietven	Boekel	51°37′20″N 5°42′45″E
Rietven	Eersel	51°25′40″N 5°17′25″E
Rijen	Gilze en Rijen	51°35′25″N 4°55′10″E
Rijkerbeek	Veghel	51°36′15″N 5°37′55″E
Rijkevoort	Boxmeer	51°39′25″N 5°53′10″E
Rijpelberg	Helmond	51°29′00″N 5°42′50″E
Rijsbergen	Zundert	51°31′05″N 4°41′50″E
Rijswijk	Woudrichem	51°47′50″N 5°01′30″E
Rijt	Bergeijk	51°17′45″N 5°18′35″E
Rinkveld	Asten	51°24′00″N 5°47′10″E
Rith	Breda	51°33′55″N 4°43′30″E
Rondveld	Sint Anthonis	51°37′15″N 5°53′50″E
Roond	Boxtel	51°34′45″N 5°17′30″E
Roosberg	Breda	51°33′45″N 4°49′25″E
Roosendaal	Roosendaal	51°31′50″N 4°27′55″E
Rootvlaas	Gemert-Bakel	51°29′50″N 5°43′35″E
Roovert	Hilvarenbeek	51°28′20″N 5°04′55″E
Rosmalen	's-Hertogenbosch	51°43′00″N 5°21′55″E
Rucphen	Rucphen	51°31′55″N 4°33′30″E
Rugdijk	Tilburg	51°35′30″N 5°05′50″E
Ruimel	Sint-Michielsgestel	51°39′05″N 5°20′40″E
Rukven	Bernheze	51°40′35″N 5°28′35″E
Rul	Heeze-Leende	51°23′40″N 5°34′40″E
Rullen	Nuenen, Gerwen en Nederwetten	51°29′45″N 5°33′20″E
Rusven	Landerd	51°43′05″N 5°40′20″E
Sambeek	Boxmeer	51°38′10″N 5°58′00″E
Schadewijk	Eersel	51°21′30″N 5°20′25″E
Schadron	Uden	51°38′10″N 5°39′20″E
Schafferden	Boxmeer	51°35′25″N 5°59′30″E
Schaft	Valkenswaard	51°17′55″N 5°27′20″E
Schaijk	Landerd	51°44′45″N 5°37′55″E
Schaluinen	Baarle-Nassau	51°25′35″N 4°56′05″E
Schans	Halderberge	51°36′25″N 4°30′40″E
Schans	Deurne	51°21′25″N 5°52′30″E
Schans	Werkendam	51°48′15″N 4°55′05″E
Scheepstal	Helmond	51°30′00″N 5°40′45″E
Schelm	Deurne	51°21′40″N 5°52′05″E
Scherpenering	Eersel	51°26′35″N 5°21′30″E
Schijf	Rucphen	51°29′55″N 4°33′40″E
Schijndel	Schijndel	51°37′20″N 5°25′55″E
Schoelieberg	Woensdrecht	51°26′25″N 4°22′55″E
Schoor	Sint-Oedenrode	51°32′30″N 5°27′05″E
Schoordijk	Cranendonck	51°16′40″N 5°35′35″E
Schoorstraat	Tilburg	51°37′35″N 5°07′05″E
Schoot	Veldhoven	51°24′05″N 5°22′45″E
Schorvert	Haaren	51°37′00″N 5°17′00″E
Schotsheuvel	Maasdonk	51°43′30″N 5°27′00″E
Schouw	Gemert-Bakel	51°29′15″N 5°44′00″E
Schutsboom	Gemert-Bakel	51°30′05″N 5°46′10″E
Selissen	Boxtel	51°36′20″N 5°19′25″E
Sengelsbroek	Bergeijk	51°17′20″N 5°20′15″E
Seters	Oosterhout	51°36′35″N 4°52′05″E
's Gravenmoer	Dongen	51°39′30″N 4°56′25″E
's-Hertogenbosch	's-Hertogenbosch	51°42′00″N 5°18′15″E
Sint Agatha	Cuijk	51°42′45″N 5°54′45″E
Sint Anthonis	Sint Anthonis	51°37′35″N 5°52′55″E
Sint Hubert	Mill en Sint Hubert	51°40′40″N 5°48′30″E
Sint-Michielsgestel	Sint-Michielsgestel	51°38′30″N 5°21′10″E
Sint-Oedenrode	Sint-Oedenrode	51°34′00″N 5°27′35″E
Sint Willebrord	Rucphen	51°32′55″N 4°35′20″E
Slabroek	Uden	51°41′50″N 5°36′05″E
Sleeuwijk	Werkendam	51°48′55″N 4°57′10″E
Sliffert	Eindhoven	51°26′10″N 5°25′25″E
Slikkenburg	Bergen op Zoom	51°31′45″N 4°15′00″E
Sloot	Deurne	51°24′15″N 5°50′00″E
Sluis Dertien	Someren	50°50′40″N 5°44′30″E
Sneidershoek	Eersel	51°23′20″N 5°19′45″E
Snijders-Chaam	Alphen-Chaam	51°31′45″N 4°51′15″E
Soerendonk	Cranendonck	51°18′05″N 5°34′30″E
Someren	Someren	51°23′05″N 5°42′40″E
Someren-Eind	Someren	51°21′25″N 5°44′00″E
Someren-Heide	Someren	51°21′00″N 5°41′55″E
Son	Son en Breugel	51°31′00″N 5°29′15″E
Sonniuswijk	Son en Breugel	51°31′35″N 5°27′45″E
Spaanrijt	Bergeijk	51°18′40″N 5°17′25″E
Spaansehoek	Goirle	51°31′25″N 5°00′40″E
Spekklef	Sint Anthonis	51°35′45″N 5°51′10″E
Spekt	Nuenen, Gerwen en Nederwetten	51°29′45″N 5°32′20″E
Spijk	Aalburg	51°46′10″N 5°07′15″E
Spijkert	Eersel	51°19′50″N 5°18′05″E
Spinolaberg	Bergen op Zoom	51°30′50″N 4°16′10″E
Spoordonk	Oirschot	51°31′05″N 5°16′15″E
Sprang-Capelle	Waalwijk	51°40′30″N 5°00′50″E
Sprangsevaart	Loon op Zand	51°39′40″N 5°03′45″E
Sprokkelbosch	's-Hertogenbosch	51°43′15″N 5°23′00″E
Sprundel	Rucphen	51°32′15″N 4°35′50″E
Stabrecht	Heeze-Leende	51°23′10″N 5°34′50″E
Stadse Dijk	Moerdijk	51°40′00″N 4°26′15″E
Stad van Gerwen	Nuenen, Gerwen en Nederwetten	51°30′30″N 5°32′25″E
Stampersgat	Halderberge	51°36′45″N 4°26′40″E
Standdaarbuiten	Moerdijk	51°36′50″N 4°30′50″E
Startwijk	Boxmeer	51°39′50″N 5°55′50″E
Statendam	Geertruidenberg	51°41′20″N 4°50′20″E
Steelhoven	Drimmelen	51°40′55″N 4°49′40″E
Steenbergen	Steenbergen	51°35′05″N 4°19′10″E
Steenoven	Oosterhout	51°36′30″N 4°54′10″E
Steenpaal	Rucphen	51°28′45″N 4°29′10″E
Steensel	Eersel	51°22′35″N 5°21′10″E
Stegen	Asten	51°24′45″N 5°45′40″E
Stenenheul	Woudrichem	51°46′40″N 5°00′45″E
Sterksel	Heeze-Leende	51°21′05″N 5°36′40″E
Stevensbeek	Sint Anthonis	51°36′10″N 5°55′00″E
Stevert	Eersel	51°22′05″N 5°21′50″E
Stipdonk	Someren	51°26′40″N 5°41′05″E
Stiphout	Helmond	51°29′10″N 5°37′05″E
Stokkelen	Eersel	51°20′55″N 5°19′40″E
Stokske	Oisterwijk	51°33′05″N 5°11′25″E
Stoof	Halderberge	51°35′55″N 4°28′40″E
Straten	Oirschot	51°30′40″N 5°20′35″E
Strepen	Uden	51°38′25″N 5°38′35″E
Strijbeek	Alphen-Chaam	51°30′10″N 4°47′45″E
Strijp	Laarbeek	51°30′00″N 5°37′45″E
Strikberg	Breda	51°37′20″N 4°46′30″E
Strooiendorp	Moerdijk	51°40′50″N 4°41′35″E
Stuivezand	Drimmelen	51°40′10″N 4°46′00″E
Stuivezand	Zundert	51°29′20″N 4°40′50″E
't Coll	Eindhoven	51°26′45″N 5°32′30″E
Teeffelen	Lith	51°47′50″N 5°29′35″E
Ten Vorsel	Bladel	51°20′50″N 5°13′20″E
Ter Aalst	Oosterhout	51°38′25″N 4°48′20″E
Tereyken	Gemert-Bakel	51°31′35″N 5°41′25″E
Terheijden	Drimmelen	51°38′35″N 4°45′15″E
Terover	Alphen-Chaam	51°28′20″N 4°58′15″E
Tervoort	Breda	51°34′30″N 4°50′20″E
Teteringen	Breda	51°36′35″N 4°49′15″E
't Haantje	Steenbergen	51°34′10″N 4°23′00″E
Theetuin	Oirschot	51°29′50″N 5°18′30″E
't Herselt	Boxmeer	51°36′30″N 5°59′20″E
't Hoekske	Tilburg	51°35′40″N 5°08′00″E
't Hof	Laarbeek	51°30′40″N 5°35′30″E
Tielse Hoeve	Sint-Michielsgestel	51°38′45″N 5°22′30″E
Tiggelt	Zundert	51°30′35″N 4°41′15″E
Tiggeltscheberg	Zundert	51°31′15″N 4°40′25″E
Tilburg	Tilburg	51°33′50″N 5°04′30″E
Timmereind	Waalre	51°22′45″N 5°26′05″E
't Marktje	Woensdrecht	51°25′35″N 4°18′30″E
Tommel	Baarle-Nassau	51°25′55″N 4°55′30″E
Tongeren	Boxtel	51°35′30″N 5°17′20″E
Tonnekreek	Moerdijk	51°40′40″N 4°29′35″E
Toom	Cranendonck	51°16′10″N 5°33′35″E
Toterfout	Veldhoven	51°25′00″N 5°20′55″E
Toven	Sint Anthonis	51°38′25″N 5°51′30″E
Tregelaar	Oirschot	51°31′40″N 5°18′25″E
Trent	Landerd	51°40′50″N 5°42′00″E
Trimpert	Geldrop	51°25′45″N 5°37′15″E
Tuuthees	Boxmeer	51°36′15″N 5°59′00″E
't Winkel	Haaren	51°37′10″N 5°10′55″E
't Zand	Werkendam	51°48′50″N 4°57′45″E
't Zand	Alphen-Chaam	51°29′40″N 4°57′25″E
Uden	Uden	51°39′40″N 5°37′10″E
Udenhout	Tilburg	51°36′35″N 5°08′35″E
Uitwijk	Woudrichem	51°47′10″N 5°00′25″E
Ulicoten	Baarle-Nassau	51°27′25″N 4°51′30″E
Ullingen	Sint Anthonis	51°38′05″N 5°51′30″E
Ulvenhout	Breda	51°33′00″N 4°48′00″E
Uppel	Woudrichem	51°47′20″N 4°56′20″E
Urkhoven	Eindhoven	51°26′10″N 5°31′55″E
Vaareind	Breda	51°35′15″N 4°43′00″E
Vaarle	Nuenen, Gerwen en Nederwetten	51°27′30″N 5°34′45″E
Vaarsche Hoef	Someren	51°24′20″N 5°40′45″E
Vaart	Dongen	51°38′40″N 4°57′55″E
Valkenhorst	Heeze-Leende	51°21′10″N 5°30′05″E
Valkenswaard	Valkenswaard	51°21′00″N 5°27′35″E
Veen	Aalburg	51°46′40″N 5°06′30″E
Veghel	Veghel	51°37′00″N 5°32′55″E
Veldbraak	Baarle-Nassau	51°26′25″N 4°57′50″E
Veldhoven	Veldhoven	51°25′05″N 5°24′10″E
Velmolen	Uden	51°39′00″N 5°38′10″E
Velp	Grave	51°44′55″N 5°43′05″E
Ven	Gemert-Bakel	51°31′00″N 5°44′50″E
Ven	Veghel	51°38′25″N 5°33′00″E
Ven	Heeze-Leende	51°22′00″N 5°33′50″E
Venbergen	Valkenswaard	51°20′05″N 5°27′10″E
Veneind	Eersel	51°25′00″N 5°17′50″E
Venhorst	Boekel	51°36′30″N 5°44′15″E
Venweg	Alphen-Chaam	51°27′40″N 4°56′30″E
Verhoven	Gilze en Rijen	51°33′00″N 4°55′25″E
Verlorenhoek	Sint Anthonis	51°39′45″N 5°49′00″E
Verloren Hoek	Breda	51°36′20″N 4°41′00″E
Vernhout	Sint-Oedenrode	51°32′15″N 5°26′15″E
Verreheide	Gemert-Bakel	51°34′40″N 5°41′45″E
Vessem	Eersel	51°25′15″N 5°17′20″E
Vetterik	Bergen op Zoom	51°30′55″N 4°16′20″E
Vianen	Cuijk	51°43′05″N 5°51′25″E
Vierbannen	Werkendam	51°44′55″N 4°54′35″E
Vierlingsbeek	Boxmeer	51°35′45″N 6°00′35″E
Vijcie	Werkendam	51°49′10″N 4°55′00″E
Vijfhoek	Roosendaal	51°30′25″N 4°21′50″E
Vijfhuizen	Goirle	51°31′20″N 4°59′05″E
Vijfhuizen	Tilburg	51°36′25″N 5°05′40″E
Vinkel	Maasdonk	51°42′20″N 5°27′45″E
Vinkenberg	Oisterwijk	51°32′00″N 5°10′40″E
Vinkenbroek	Roosendaal	51°31′20″N 4°24′40″E
Visberg	Steenbergen	51°33′10″N 4°25′00″E
Visdonk	Roosendaal	51°30′10″N 4°29′05″E
Vlagberg	Sint Anthonis	51°36′45″N 5°51′35″E
Vlas	Someren	51°22′10″N 5°42′55″E
Vleet	Roosendaal	51°27′20″N 4°24′00″E
Vlierden	Deurne	51°26′45″N 5°45′30″E
Vlijmen	Heusden	51°41′50″N 5°13′00″E
Vloeieind	Deurne	51°26′40″N 5°46′15″E
Vloeieind	Reusel-De Mierden	51°23′55″N 5°09′05″E
Vloet	Uden	51°38′45″N 5°38′40″E
Voederheil	Landerd	51°42′25″N 5°39′55″E
Volkel	Uden	51°38′35″N 5°39′15″E
Voordeldonk	Asten	51°24′10″N 5°46′30″E
Voordijk	Heusden	51°42′25″N 5°13′35″E
Vooreind	Reusel-De Mierden	51°23′25″N 5°09′55″E
Voorste Beersdonk	Deurne	51°26′30″N 5°43′35″E
Voorste Brug	Valkenswaard	51°17′05″N 5°25′35″E
Voorste Diesdonk	Asten	51°25′25″N 5°43′00″E
Voorste Heikant	Reusel-De Mierden	51°20′45″N 5°09′15″E
Voort	Bergeijk	51°20′55″N 5°23′15″E
Voort	Deurne	51°28′45″N 5°47′05″E
Voorteind	Oirschot	51°28′30″N 5°14′35″E
Voortje	Geldrop	51°25′35″N 5°38′05″E
Vorstenbosch	Bernheze	51°39′10″N 5°33′00″E
Vortum-Mullem	Boxmeer	51°37′15″N 5°58′40″E
Voske	Baarle-Nassau	51°26′55″N 4°58′35″E
Vosselen	Asten	51°24′50″N 5°43′35″E
Vossenberg	Gilze en Rijen	51°32′45″N 4°57′50″E
Vossenberg	Gemert-Bakel	51°34′00″N 5°47′05″E
Vrachelen	Oosterhout	51°39′10″N 4°49′35″E
Vreewijk	Deurne	51°26′35″N 5°47′55″E
Vrilkhoven	Boxtel	51°34′00″N 5°21′05″E
Vroenhout	Roosendaal	51°32′35″N 4°25′10″E
Vuchtschoot	Breda	51°33′40″N 4°42′20″E
Vught	Vught	51°39′15″N 5°17′15″E
Waalre	Waalre	51°23′10″N 5°26′40″E
Waalwijk	Waalwijk	51°41′00″N 5°04′15″E
Waardhuizen	Woudrichem	51°46′35″N 5°00′15″E
Wagenberg	Drimmelen	51°39′55″N 4°44′55″E
Walik	Bergeijk	51°21′30″N 5°22′00″E
Walsert	Sint Anthonis	51°39′15″N 5°51′15″E
Wamberg	Sint-Michielsgestel	51°41′40″N 5°22′20″E
Wanroij	Sint Anthonis	51°39′25″N 5°49′05″E
Waspik	Waalwijk	51°41′15″N 4°56′40″E
Waterkant	Bergen op Zoom	51°32′50″N 4°15′55″E
Waterstraat	Hilvarenbeek	51°28′35″N 5°09′45″E
Weebosch	Bergeijk	51°18′30″N 5°17′40″E
Weeg	Uden	51°38′15″N 5°37′55″E
Weilenseind	Gilze en Rijen	51°32′05″N 4°56′40″E
Weimeren	Zundert	51°27′00″N 4°37′40″E
Welberg	Steenbergen	51°34′35″N 4°19′50″E
Werkendam	Werkendam	51°48′35″N 4°53′40″E
Wernhout	Zundert	51°27′20″N 4°38′30″E
Wernhoutsbrug	Zundert	51°25′40″N 4°37′30″E
Werveld	Boxmeer	51°41′20″N 5°55′40″E
Westelbeers	Oirschot	51°26′40″N 5°12′40″E
Westerbeek	Sint Anthonis	51°34′55″N 5°51′45″E
Westerhoven	Bergeijk	51°20′00″N 5°23′45″E
Westerwijk	Hilvarenbeek	51°30′40″N 5°07′55″E
Westrik	Breda	51°35′35″N 4°43′10″E
Wielsche Hoeven	Sint-Michielsgestel	51°37′40″N 5°21′25″E
Wijbosch	Schijndel	51°37′00″N 5°28′05″E
Wijk en Aalburg	Aalburg	51°45′25″N 5°07′45″E
Wilbertoord	Mill en Sint Hubert	51°39′20″N 5°46′30″E
Wildert	Zundert	51°27′40″N 4°40′10″E
Willemstad	Moerdijk	51°41′30″N 4°26′20″E
Willibrordushoek	Veghel	51°35′45″N 5°30′25″E
Winkel	Haaren	51°36′45″N 5°10′10″E
Winkel	Cranendonck	51°17′50″N 5°34′50″E
Winkelstraat	Someren	51°26′10″N 5°39′15″E
Wintelre	Eersel	51°26′40″N 5°20′25″E
Witrijt	Bergeijk	51°18′45″N 5°15′50″E
Witte Dellen	Landerd	51°41′15″N 5°43′10″E
Woensdrecht	Woensdrecht	51°25′50″N 4°18′10″E
Wolfsbosch	Gemert-Bakel	51°33′50″N 5°42′50″E
Wolfshoek	Eersel	51°24′00″N 5°21′20″E
Wolfswinkel	Son en Breugel	51°31′30″N 5°29′35″E
Woud	Sint-Michielsgestel	51°39′15″N 5°22′40″E
Woudrichem	Woudrichem	51°48′55″N 5°00′05″E
Wouw	Roosendaal	51°31′20″N 4°23′25″E
Wouwse Hil	Roosendaal	51°29′50″N 4°23′55″E
Wouwse Plantage	Roosendaal	51°29′00″N 4°23′15″E
Zaarvlaas	Gemert-Bakel	51°31′05″N 5°44′10″E
Zand	Gemert-Bakel	51°30′35″N 5°44′50″E
Zandeind	Goirle	51°31′55″N 5°00′45″E
Zandfort	Woensdrecht	51°26′05″N 4°19′25″E
Zandhoek	Boekel	51°35′50″N 5°39′45″E
Zandkant	Sint Anthonis	51°38′00″N 5°54′10″E
Zandkant	Haaren	51°38′20″N 5°09′45″E
Zandoerle	Veldhoven	51°24′55″N 5°21′30″E
Zandwijk	Woudrichem	51°46′40″N 4°58′30″E
Zeeland	Landerd	51°41′50″N 5°40′35″E
Zeelberg	Valkenswaard	51°20′25″N 5°28′30″E
Zeelst	Veldhoven	51°25′23″N 5°24′59″E
Zegge	Rucphen	51°33′25″N 4°31′05″E
Zelt	Oisterwijk	51°31′35″N 5°10′40″E
Zevenbergen	Bernheze	51°43′50″N 5°34′30″E
Zevenbergen	Moerdijk	51°38′40″N 4°36′15″E
Zevenbergschen Hoek	Moerdijk	51°40′20″N 4°40′45″E
Zevenhuis	Landerd	51°42′00″N 5°39′35″E
Zevenhuizen	Heeze-Leende	51°20′35″N 5°33′40″E
Zevenhuizen	Moerdijk	51°38′55″N 4°24′55″E
Zevenhutten	Cuijk	51°42′55″N 5°52′35″E
Zijp	Boekel	51°36′25″N 5°42′20″E
Zijtaart	Veghel	51°35′35″N 5°32′30″E
Zittard	Veldhoven	51°24′25″N 5°22′05″E
Zoggel	Bernheze	51°43′50″N 5°29′40″E
Zomerven	Someren	51°22′50″N 5°39′50″E
Zondveld	Veghel	51°34′30″N 5°33′25″E
Zoomvliet	Roosendaal	51°29′40″N 4°21′30″E
Zuid-Carolina	Mill en Sint Hubert	51°41′35″N 5°44′20″E
Zuidgeest	Bergen op Zoom	51°28′00″N 4°18′30″E
Zundert	Zundert	51°28′20″N 4°39′20″E
Zwartenberg	Etten-Leur	51°37′25″N 4°38′10″E
Zwijnsbergen	Sint-Oedenrode	51°31′35″N 5°30′25″E
Zwingelspaan	Moerdijk	51°39′35″N 4°29′45″E
