= Kruisstraat =

Kruisstraat may refer to several locations in the Dutch province of North Brabant:

- Kruisstraat, 's-Hertogenbosch
- Kruisstraat, Roosendaal
- Kruisstraat, Halderberge
