= Zittard =

Hamlet in south Netherlands

Coordinates: 51°24′22″N 5°22′06″E

- Hamlet
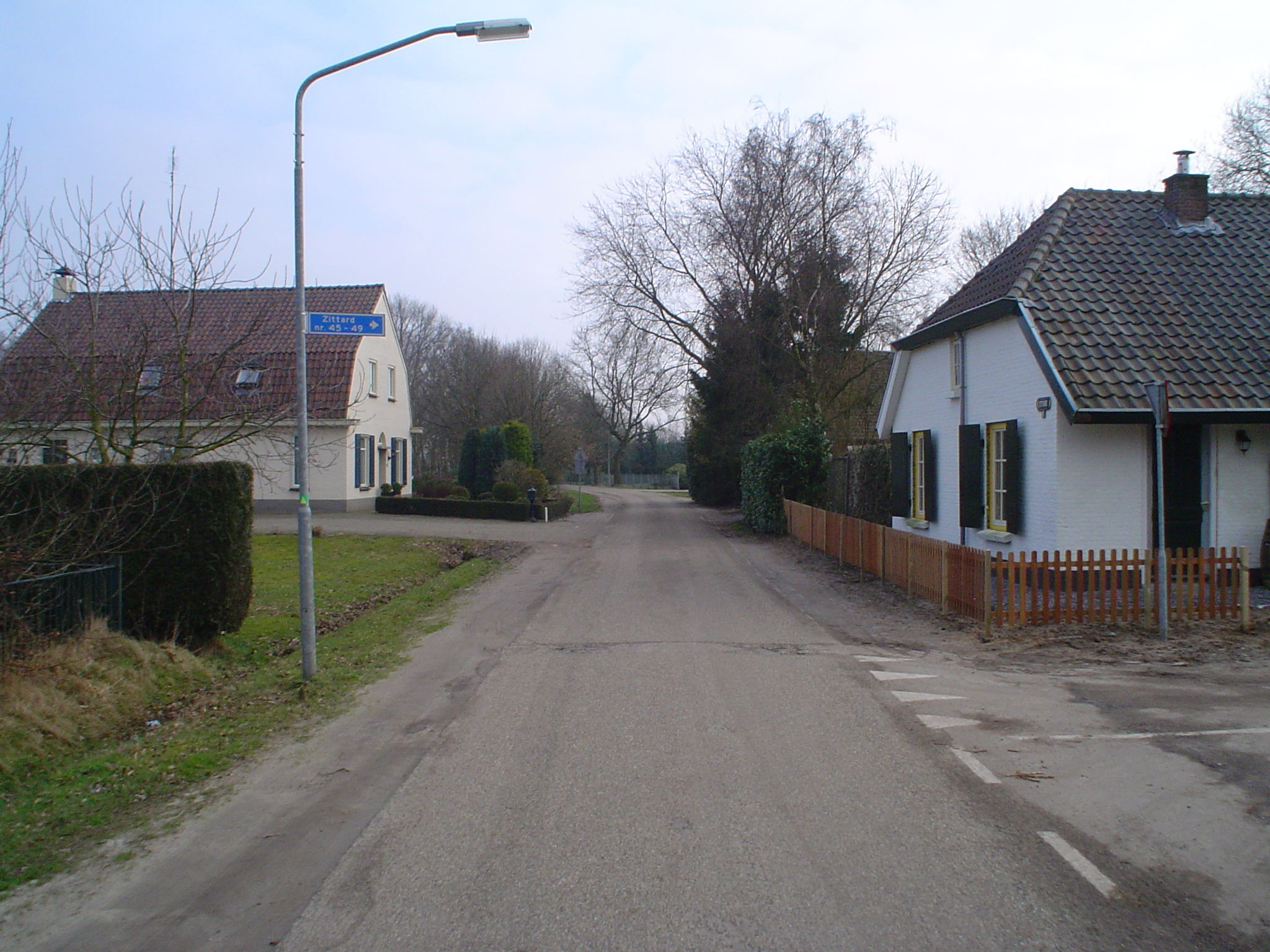
- Farmhouses in Zittard
- Interactive map of Zittard
- Country: Netherlands
- Province: North Brabant
- Municipality: Veldhoven

Population (2008)
  - Total: 160
- Time zone: UTC+1 (CET)
  - Summer (DST): UTC+2 (CEST)

Zittard is a hamlet in the municipality of Veldhoven in the province of North Brabant, the Netherlands. The hamlet is located on a road with the same name and consists mostly of farms. As of 2008, Zittard has a population of 160 people.

== Etymology ==
An official document of the year 1348 lists the name Sittert. The name Zittard is of the same source as the name of the city Sittard in Limburg. The name refers to an area with grasslands or a place with a stable for cattle and sheep.

== Geography ==
Location of Zittard in the municipality of Veldhoven

=== Topography ===
Zittard is located two kilometres south of the village Oerle and two kilometres east of the residential area Veldhoven Dorp. The hamlet lies along a road with the same name, which connects the hamlet Zandoerle with the hamlet Schoot. Southwest of Zittard flows the stream Poelenloop.

=== Nature and landscape ===
West of Zittard lies the forest area Molenvelden, named after a windmill which was present from 1360 until 1914. The forest area Zandoerlese Bossen can be found in the north. This forest is known for its network of hedges, which was constructed in the Middle Ages to mark the boundaries between the fields.
