= Schoot =

Schoot may refer to:

- Schoot (Eindhoven), a quarter of Eindhoven, the Netherlands
- Schoot (Tessenderlo), a hamlet near Tessenderlo, Belgium
- Schoot (Veldhoven), a hamlet near Veldhoven, the Netherlands

== People with the surname ==
- Lique Schoot (born 1969), Dutch visual artist
- Myrthe Schoot (born 1988), Dutch volleyball player
