= Mortel (disambiguation) =

Mortel is a French television series.

Mortel or Mörtel may also refer to:

- Jan Mortel (1652–1719), Dutch painter
- Renáta Mörtel (born 1983), Hungarian former handball player
- Marlo Mortel, stage name of Jhann Marlowe Galman Pamintuan (born 1993), Filipino actor, musician and singer-songwriter
- "Mörtel", nickname of Richard Lugner (1932–2024), Austrian businessman and politician

== See also ==
- De Mortel, a Dutch village
- Mortal (disambiguation)
