= Noord (disambiguation) =

Noord (Dutch for "North") is the name of several locations:

- Noord, a town in Aruba
- Noord, North Brabant, a hamlet in the Netherlands
- Noord, Rotterdam, a neighbourhood of Rotterdam
- Amsterdam-Noord
- Noord (river), a river in the Netherlands
- Noord, Suriname
- Noord (crater), a crater on Mars
- Northern Europe (Dutch: Noord-Europa)
