= Hoogveld =

Hoogveld is a Dutch surname. Notable people with the surname include:

- Jacobus Hoogveld (1884–1948), Dutch athlete
- Hans Hoogveld (1947–2024), Dutch water polo player
- Niek Hoogveld (born 1999), Dutch footballer
