= Papenvoort, North Brabant =

Papenvoort
- Hamlet
- Location in the province of North Brabant in the Netherlands Papenvoort (Netherlands)
- Coordinates: 51°38′54″N 5°52′10″E
- Country: Netherlands
- Province: North Brabant
- Municipality: Laarbeek
- Time zone: UTC+1 (CET)
  - Summer (DST): UTC+2 (CEST)
- Postal code: 5447
- Dialing code: 0485

Papenvoort is a hamlet in the Dutch province of North Brabant. It is located in the former municipality of Sint Anthonis, about 1 km southwest of Rijkevoort. Since 2022 it has been part of the new municipality of Land van Cuijk.

Papenvoort is not a statistical entity, and the postal authorities have placed it under Rijkevoort. It has no place name signs. Papenvoort was first mentioned in 1311 as Papenvort, and means "ford belonging to Papo (person)". It consists of about 15 houses.
