= Vloet =

Vloet is a surname. Notable people with the surname include:

- Levi Vloet (born 1996), Dutch para-athlete
- Rai Vloet (born 1995), Dutch footballer
- Sanne Vloet (born 1995), Dutch model
- Wiljan Vloet (born 1962), Dutch football manager
