= Maasdonk =

- Former municipality
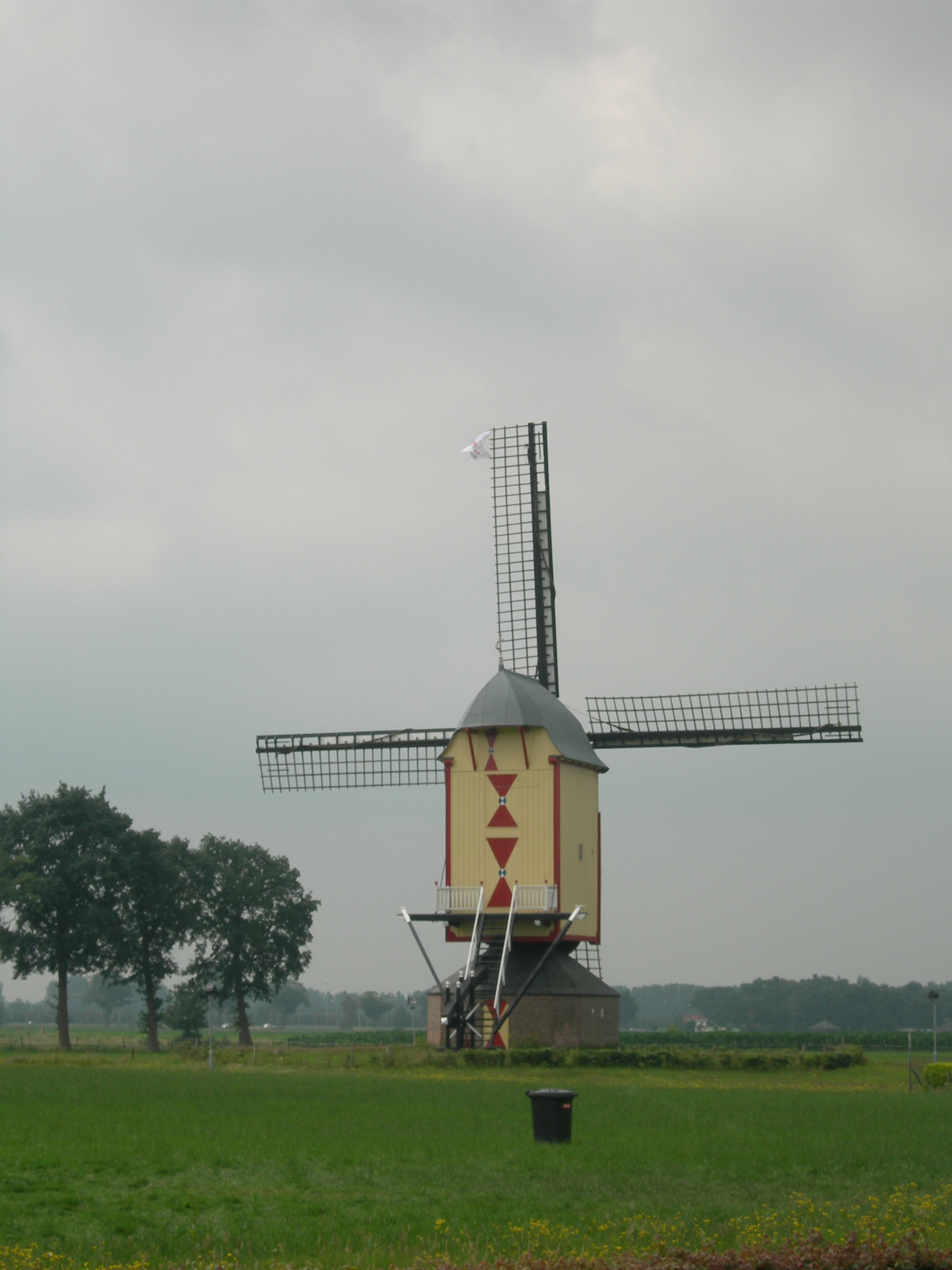
- Monumental windmill in Geffen

- Flag Coat of arms

- Location in North Brabant
- Coordinates: 51°44′N 5°28′E
- Country: Netherlands
- Province: North Brabant
- Municipality: 's-Hertogenbosch, Oss
- Established: 1993

Area
  - Total: 37.35 km^{2} (14.42 sq mi)
  - Land: 37.25 km^{2} (14.38 sq mi)
  - Water: 0.10 km^{2} (0.039 sq mi)
- Elevation: 6 m (20 ft)

Population (January 2021)
  - Total: (May 2,014) 11,284
- Time zone: UTC+1 (CET)
  - Summer (DST): UTC+2 (CEST)
- Postcode: 5381–5383, 5386, 5390–5392
- Area code: 073
- Website: www.maasdonk.nl

Maasdonk (Dutch pronunciation: [ˈmaːzdɔŋk]) is a former municipality in the southern Netherlands that existed from 1993 until 1 January 2015, when it was merged with the existing municipalities of 's-Hertogenbosch and Oss.

== Population centres ==
- Geffen
- Nuland
- Vinkel
