= Niek Hoogveld =

Dutch footballer (born 1999)

Personal information
- Date of birth: 24 March 1999 (age 27)
- Place of birth: Wageningen, Netherlands
- Height: 1.83 m (6 ft 0 in)
- Position: Centre-back

Team information
- Current team: TEC
- Number: 24

Youth career
- RKSV Driel
- 2008–2017: NEC

Senior career*
Years	Team	Apps	(Gls)
2017–2020	NEC	2	(0)
2020–2022	Hercules	37	(1)
2022–2025	Kozakken Boys	74	(4)
2025–	TEC	8	(1)

International career
2015	Netherlands U16	2	(0)
2015	Netherlands U17	8	(0)
- * Club domestic league appearances and goals as of 19:46, 21 October 2025 (UTC)

Niek Hoogveld (born 24 March 1999) is a Dutch footballer who plays as a centre-back for TEC.

== Club career ==
Hoogveld started playing football at hometown club RKSV Driel, and since 2008 in the youth of NEC. On 15 March 2019 he made his senior debut for the Nijmegen club against FC Den Bosch. Failing to make the grade at NEC he joined Hercules in 2020 and later spent three seasons at Kozakken Boys.

After Hoogeveld left NEC in 2020, he turned amateur and became a dietitian in Nijmegen alongside running a football school. He moved to AZ in 2023 to become their Head Nutritionist.

== International career ==
Hoogveld played 8 games for the Netherlands national under-17 football team and 2 for the U16s. He also played for the U15s.
