= Ven, Heeze-Leende =

Ven
- Hamlet
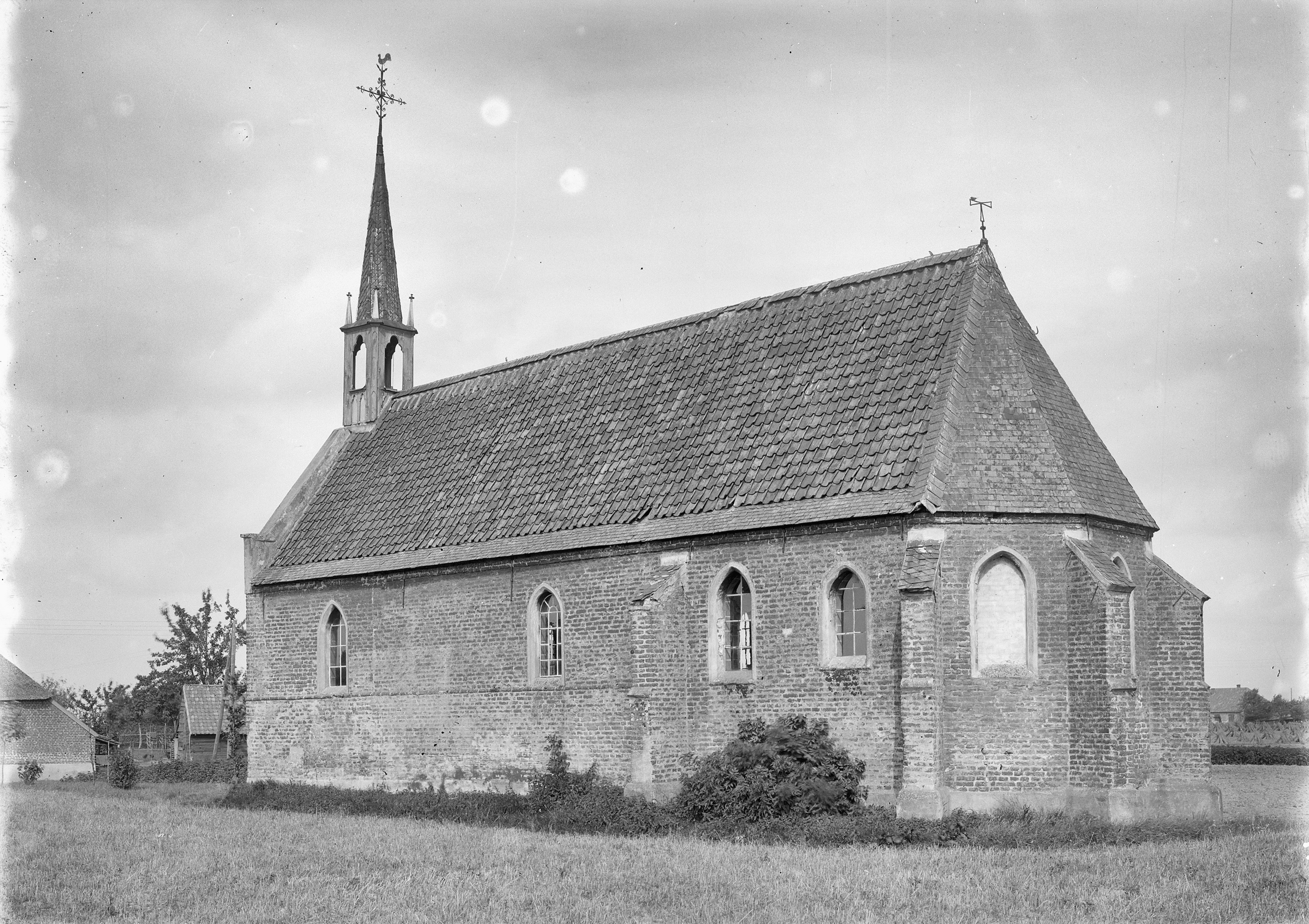
- Chapel of Ven

- Location in the province of North Brabant in the Netherlands Ven (Netherlands)
- Coordinates: 51°22′0″N 5°33′50″E
- Country: Netherlands
- Province: North Brabant
- Municipality: Halderberge
- Time zone: UTC+1 (CET)
  - Summer (DST): UTC+2 (CEST)
- Postal code: 5591
- Dialing code: 040

Ven is a hamlet in the Dutch province of North Brabant. It is located in the municipality of Heeze-Leende, halfway between the towns of Heeze and Leende.

Ven is not a statistical entity, and the postal authorities have placed it under Heeze. Ven has no place name signs. It was home to 174 people in 1840. Nowadays, it consists of about 40 houses.

It was first mentioned between 1838 and 1857 as "de Ven", and means peat excavation area.
