= Zaarvlaas =

- Hamlet
- Location in the province of North Brabant in the Netherlands Zaarvlaas (Netherlands)
- Coordinates: 51.51726°N 5.73530°E
- Country: Netherlands
- Province: North Brabant
- Municipality: Gemert-Bakel
- Time zone: UTC+1 (CET)
  - Summer (DST): UTC+2 (CEST)
- Postal code: 5761
- Dialing code: 0492

Zaarvlaas is a hamlet in the municipality of Gemert-Bakel, North Brabant province of the Netherlands.

Zaarvlaas is not a statistical entity, and the postal authorities have placed it under Bakel. It has no place name signs and consists of a handful of houses.

It was first mentioned in 1897 as Zaarvlaas, and means "sedge grass (carex) near a pond in the heath or forest".
