= Groenewoud =

Groenewoud is a surname of Dutch origin. Notable people with the surname include:

- Marijke Groenewoud (born 1999) Dutch speed skater
- Raymond van het Groenewoud (born 1950) Belgian musician
- Ron Groenewoud (born 24 January 1937) Dutch footballer and manager
- Rosalind Groenewoud (born 1989) Canadian freestyle skier
