= Wernhout =

Village in North Brabant, Netherlands

- Village
- Location in the province of North Brabant in the Netherlands Wernhout (Netherlands)
- Coordinates: 51°27′21″N 4°38′33″E
- Country: Netherlands
- Province: North Brabant
- Municipality: Zundert

Area
  - Total: 15.64 km^{2} (6.04 sq mi)
- Elevation: 13 m (43 ft)

Population (2021)
  - Total: 2,955
  - Density: 188.9/km^{2} (489.3/sq mi)
- Time zone: UTC+1 (CET)
  - Summer (DST): UTC+2 (CEST)
- Postal code: 4884
- Dialing code: 076

Wernhout is a village the south of the Netherlands. It is located in Zundert, North Brabant, near the border with Belgium.
