= Kaathoven =

Coordinates: 51°42′N 5°28′E

Kaathoven is a hamlet in the municipality of 's-Hertogenbosch, province of North Brabant, the Netherlands. The community's geographical coordinates are 51° 42' 0" North, 5° 28' 0" East.

== Etymology ==
The name likely came from the joining of the 2 words, Quaad (Modern: Kwaad) meaning bad/poor and Hoven farmsteads/homesteads which likely indicated that the land was not good for farming.

== History ==
A number of hermits settled the area around 1195 CE in Munnekens-Vinkel, a number of them later joined the Hermits of Saint William, an order of monks who had a nearby monastery, "Porta Coeli" (also known as Baseldonk), but a number of these monks remained in the area. These monks would dig the Grote Wetering which was then called the Monniksgraeve (Literally: Grave of the monks) a large watercourse. In 1298, these monks would also had their own monastery.

Kaathoven was part of the municipality of Maasdonk until 31 December 2014, the following day it was merged with 's-Hertogenbosch.

=== Saint Cunera Chapel ===
They also built a chapel, initially dedicated to Antonius Abbot, but later Saint Cunera in 1629. The chapel was closed in 1674 due to a lack of membership and it was subsequently used as a primary school and a schoolmaster's house added. In 1882 the school left and the building became a homestead. In 1979-1981 a restoration was made which made the original purpose of the building visible again.
