= Oventje =

Coordinates: 51°41′N 5°40′E

Locator map of Oventje in the former municipality of Landerd

Oventje (translated: little oven) is a small village in the Dutch province of North Brabant. The village is situated in the former municipality of Landerd. Oventje had 490 inhabitants in 2008. Since 2022 it has been part of the new municipality of Maashorst.

Oventje has a small primary school, which has been founded in 1928. Oventje has a corn windmill, named Sint Victor, a heritage monument.

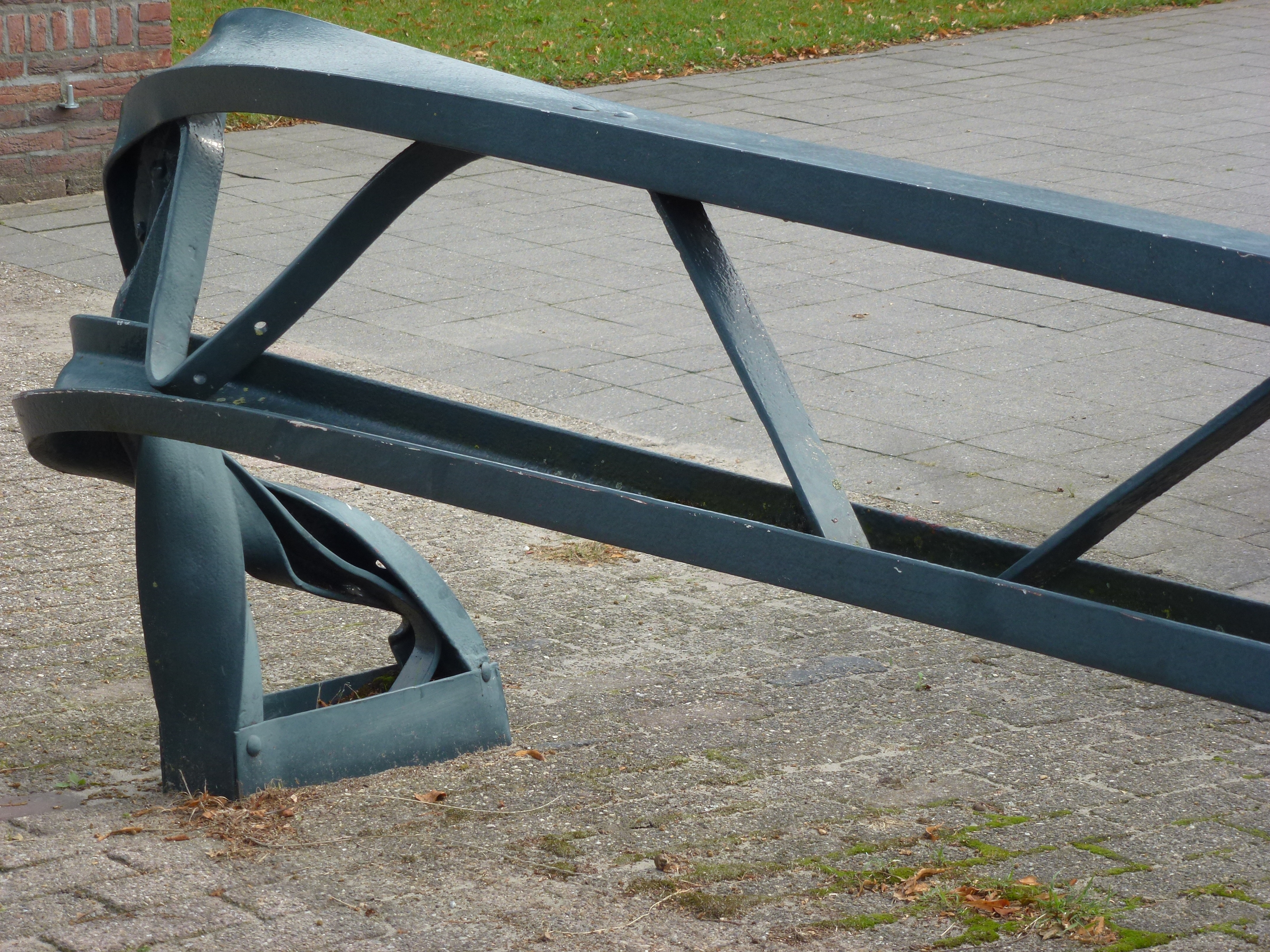
Lamp post, distorted by the 1925 cyclone

In 1925, Oventje was hit by a cyclone. A lamp post distorted by the cyclone, now a heritage monument, remembers that event.

== Sources ==
- nl: Oventje on plaatsengids, the dutch guide of localities
