= Deursen-Dennenburg =

Former Dutch municipality

- Village
- Interactive map of Deursen-Dennenburg
- Coordinates: 51.802°N 5.625°E
- Country: Netherlands
- Province: North Brabant
- Municipality: Oss

Deursen-Dennenburg is a village in the Dutch province of North Brabant. It is located in the municipality of Oss, about 8 km northeast of Oss itself. The village was formed from two former villages: the main part consists of Deursen, and the western end of the village used to be called Dennenburg.

"Deursen en Dennenburg" was a separate municipality until 1923, when it was merged with Ravenstein.
