= Oudemolen, North Brabant =

Oudemolen
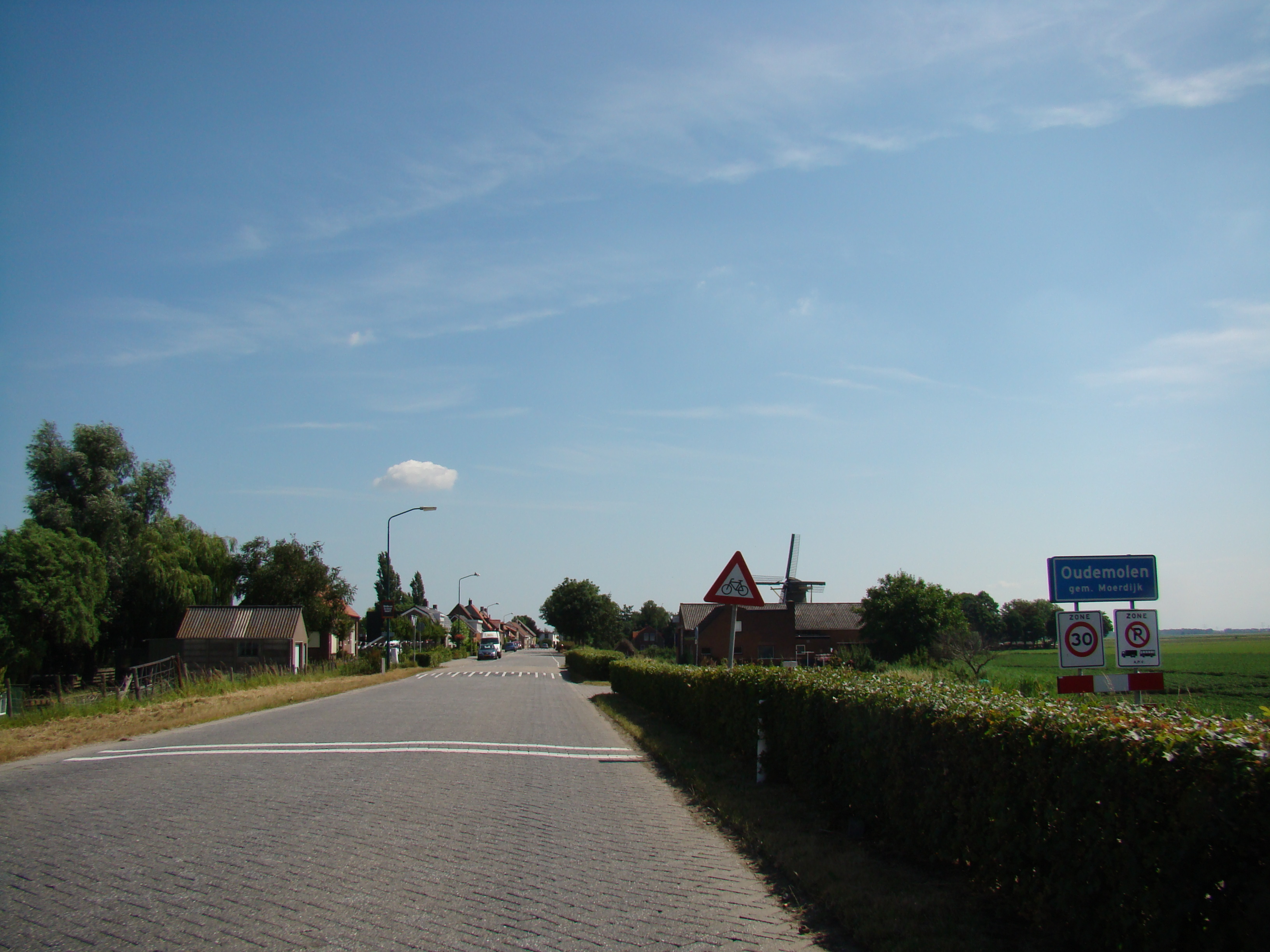
- Welcome to Oudemolen

- Location in the province of North Brabant in the Netherlands Oudemolen (Netherlands)
- Coordinates: 51°38′58″N 4°27′57″E
- Country: Netherlands
- Province: North Brabant
- Municipality: Moerdijk

Area
  - Total: 1.04 km^{2} (0.40 sq mi)
- Elevation: 0.6 m (2.0 ft)

Population (2021)
  - Total: 190
  - Density: 180/km^{2} (470/sq mi)
- Time zone: UTC+1 (CET)
  - Summer (DST): UTC+2 (CEST)
- Postal code: 4793
- Dialing code: 0168

Oudemolen is a hamlet in the province of North Brabant, one of the twelve provinces in the Netherlands. Presently it is located in the municipality of Moerdijk, which is an amalgamation of a variety of former municipalities, prominently among them Fijnaart, Klundert, Willemstad and the village of Moerdijk. Oudemolen was administered in the past by the municipality of Fijnaart.

It originated in the confluence of three dikes namely one leading to Willemstad, the other to Klundert, and the third to Fijnaart. It is a village in the fertile farmlands of West Brabant. It developed as a typical Dutch dike village and service center to neighbouring large- and medium-scale farms providing labour, schooling, postal services, basic foods, recreational and drinking establishments, and maintenance of farming implements. In its heyday it was inhabited by as many as 500 people.

These days it is a sleeping residence of families who commute between their home and workplace. Both in the past and now its main touristic attraction is the old grain windmill, which dates back to 1846 and has been recently restored to its former glory.
