= De Mortel =

- Village
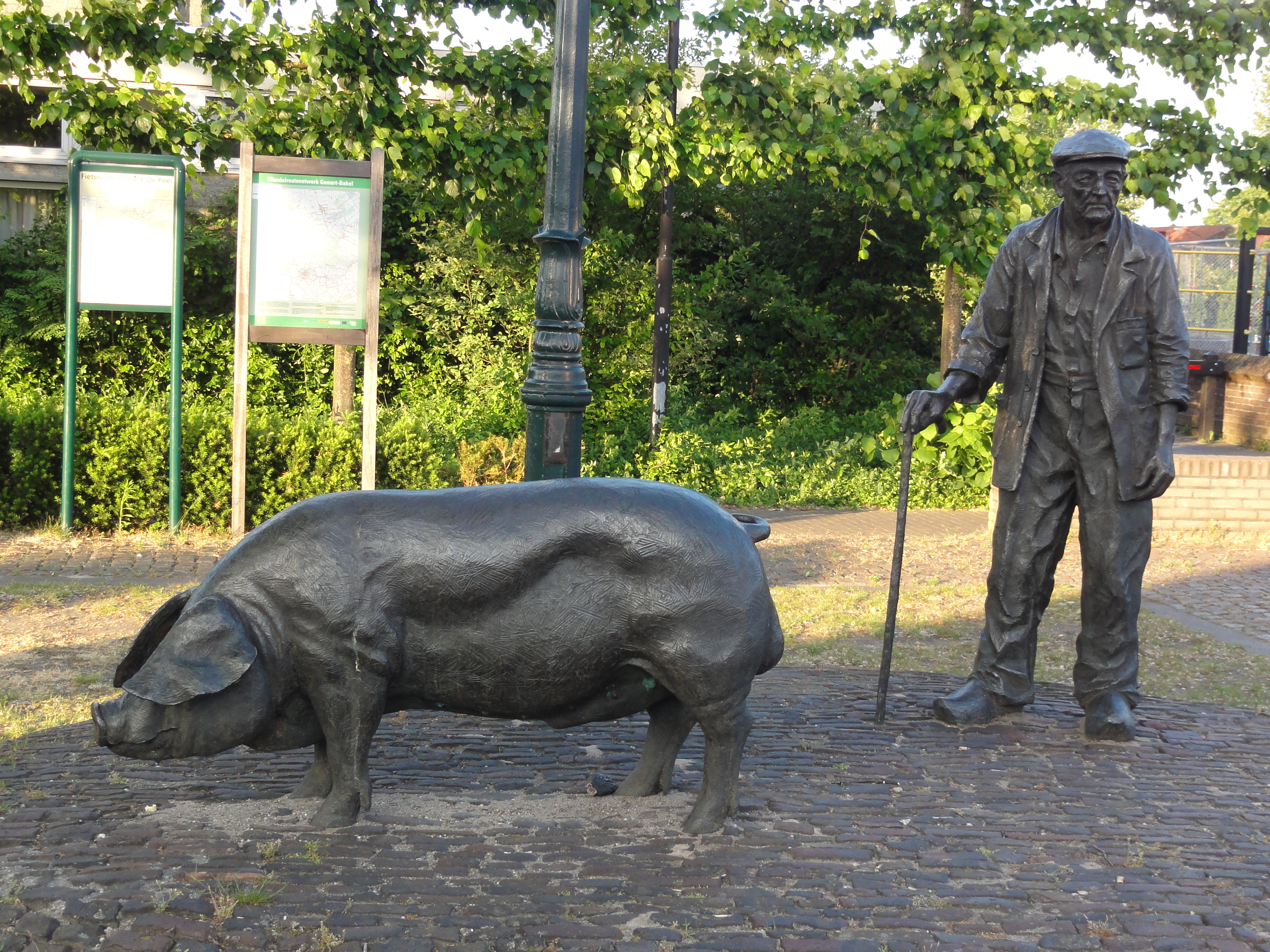
- Statue The Boar Leader

- Location in the province of North Brabant in the Netherlands De Mortel (Netherlands)
- Coordinates: 51.5383°N 5.7093°E
- Country: Netherlands
- Province: North Brabant
- Municipality: Gemert-Bakel

Area
  - Total: 10.25 km^{2} (3.96 sq mi)
- Elevation: 21 m (69 ft)

Population (2021)
  - Total: 1,415
  - Density: 138.0/km^{2} (357.5/sq mi)
- Time zone: UTC+1 (CET)
  - Summer (DST): UTC+2 (CEST)
- Postal code: 5425
- Dialing code: 0492

De Mortel is a village in the Dutch province of North Brabant. It is located in the municipality of Gemert-Bakel. The village is located about 19 kilometres (12 mi) north-east of Eindhoven.

== History ==
The village was first mentioned in 1408 as "in den mortel", and means "low lying muddy place". De Mortel developed as an agricultural community in the 14th century to the south of Gemert, and is centred around a triangular 'square' on which later a church was built.

The Catholic St Antonius Abt Church is a three-aisled, basilica-like church built between 1902 and 1904 as a replacement of the 1848 church.

The Mediatower is a 127.7 metres (419 ft) tall communication tower owned by Cellnex Telecom. The tower was constructed in 1989 and 1990. It is used as a microwave transmitter and by several radio stations. The tower is also home to a family of peregrine falcons. The falcons first appeared in 2004. In 2005, a bird house was built on top of the tower and webcams have been installed to follow the birds.

De Mortel was home to 165 people in 1840. In 1981, a bronze statue of the farmer Grardje and his boar by Toon Grassens was placed on the village square.

== Gallery ==
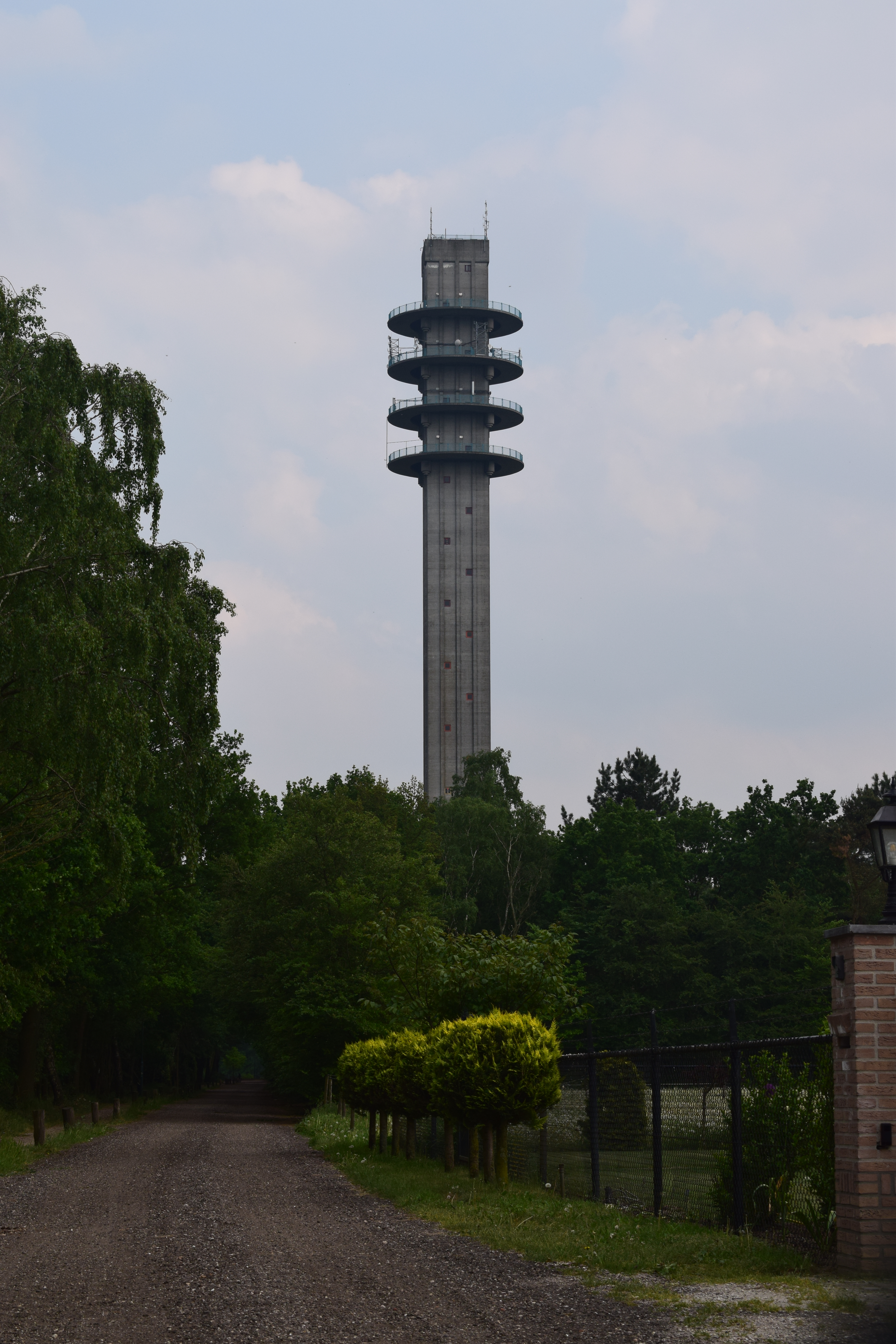
Media tower De Mortel

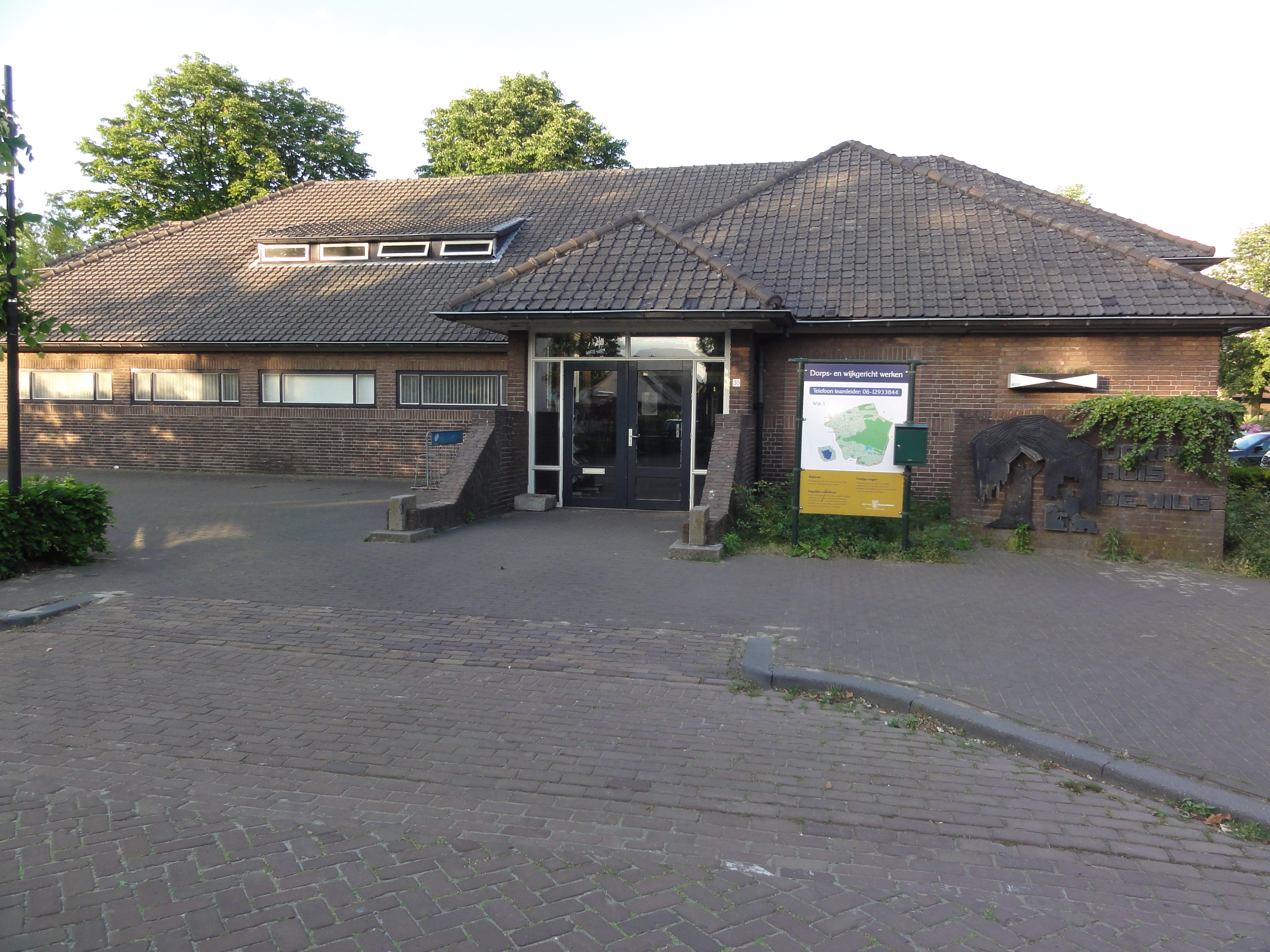
Village house De Wilg

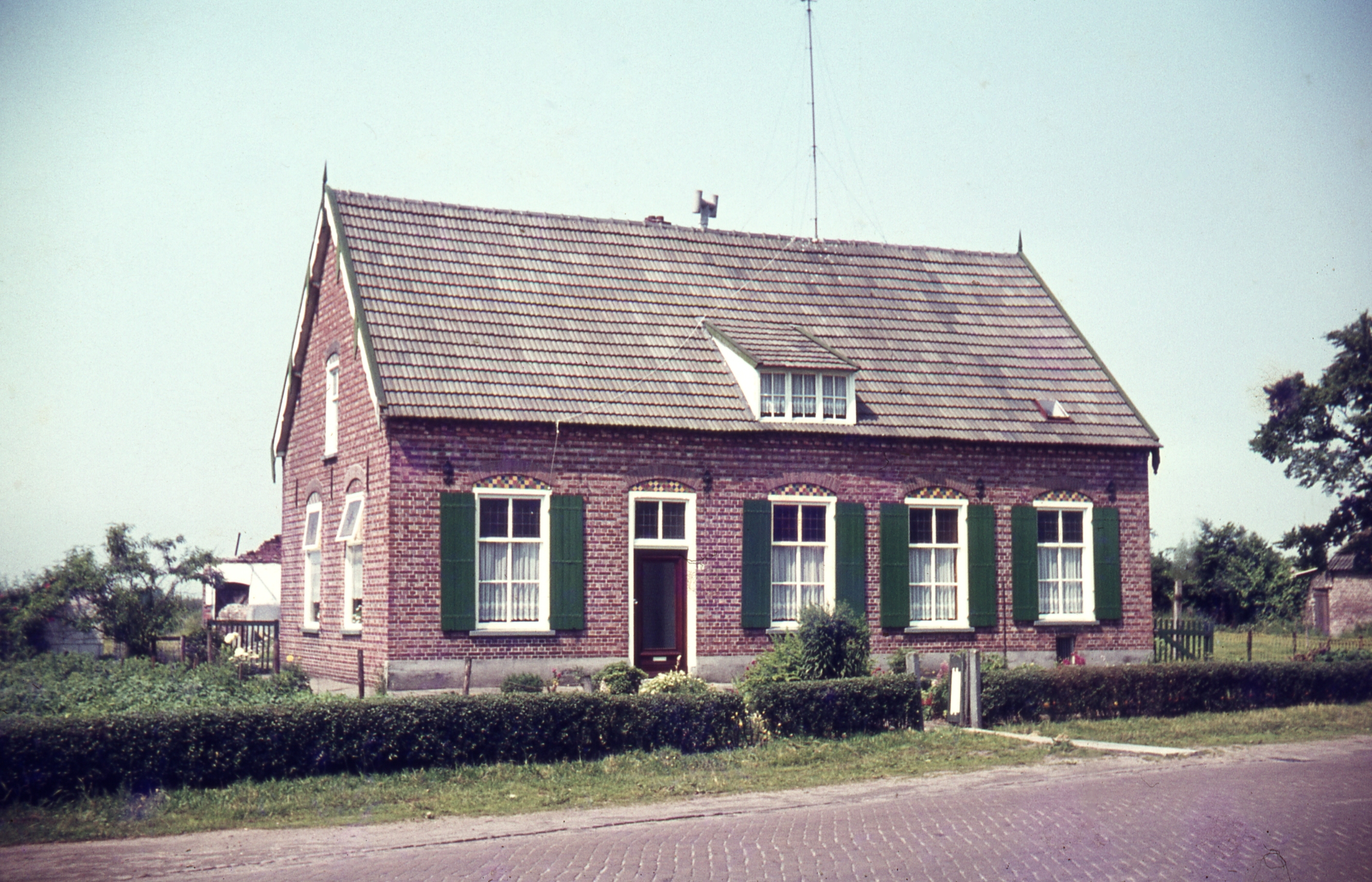
Farm in De Mortel

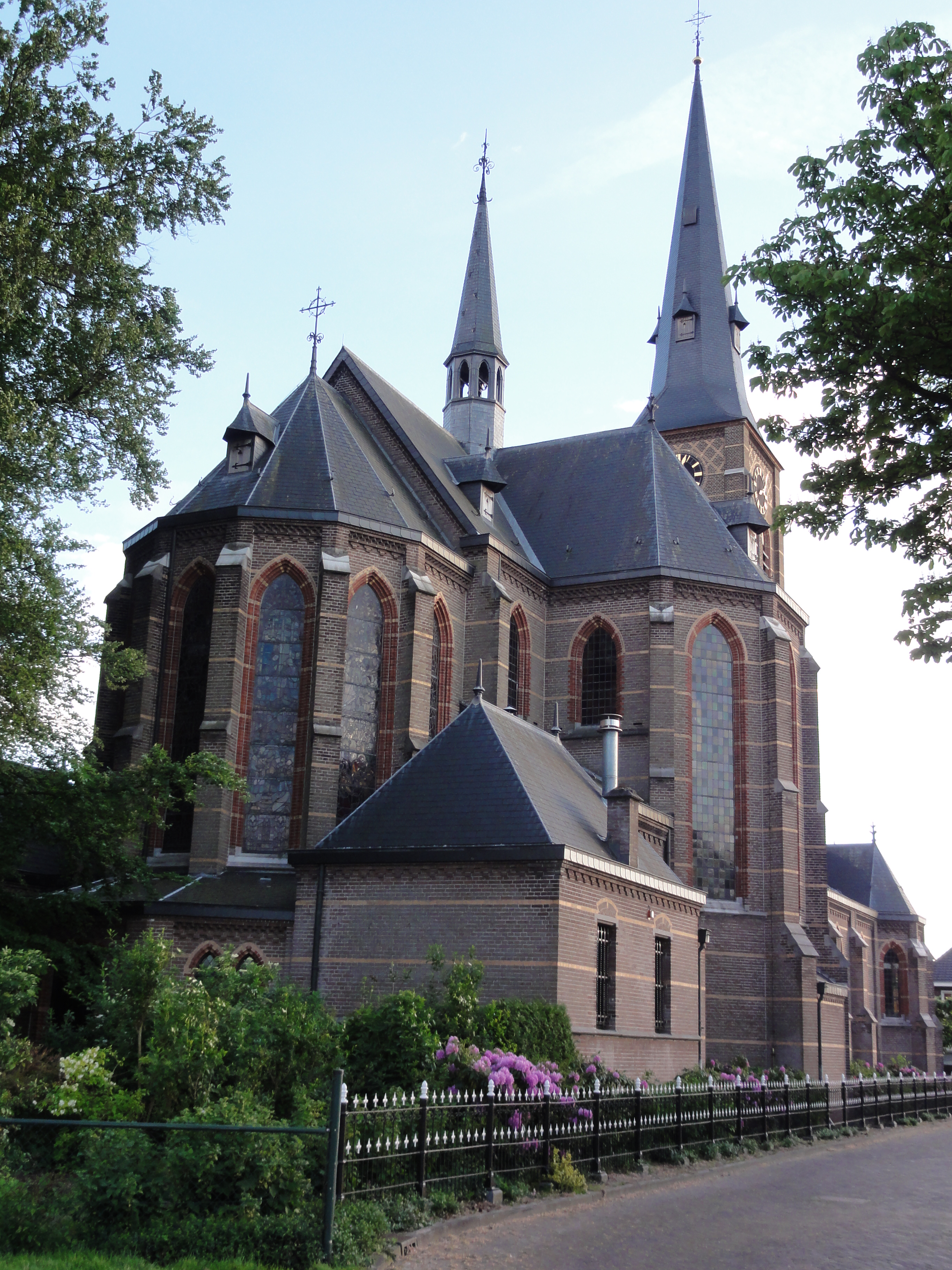
St Antonius Abt Church
