= Noord, North Brabant =

Hamlet in the Netherlands

Noord
- Hamlet
- Location in North Brabant, Netherlands
- Coordinates: 51°39′N 5°48′E
- Country: Netherlands
- Province: North Brabant
- Municipality: Sint Anthonis
- Time zone: UTC+1 (CET)
  - Summer (DST): UTC+2 (CEST)

Noord is a hamlet in the Dutch province of North Brabant. It is located in the municipality of Sint Anthonis, about 1 km west of Wanroij.
