= Zandoerle =

Coordinates: 51°24′50″N 5°21′33″E

- Hamlet
- Country: Netherlands
- Province: North Brabant
- Municipality: Veldhoven

Population (2008)
  - Total: 120
- Time zone: UTC+1 (CET)
  - Summer (DST): UTC+2 (CEST)

Zandoerle, in local tongue known as Zandoers, is a hamlet in the municipality of Veldhoven in the province of North Brabant, the Netherlands. The hamlet has a population of 120 people, as measured on the first of January 2008. The hamlet is located between the villages Oerle and Knegsel. Zandoerle can be seen as one of the two centres within the village of Oerle. The other centre is often referred to as Kerkoerle (English: Church Oerle). Zandoerle has great cultural and historical value due to its characteristic village green and monumental farms.

== Etymology ==
The name Oerle means old forest, as it is derived from the elements Oer (=old) and lo (=forest). The prefix Zand is Dutch for sand and refers to the poor and not so fertile sandy terrain surrounding the hamlet.

== Monuments ==
The square shaped village green of Zandoerle is a preserved monument. The village green is covered with linden trees and is surrounded by six farms with long fronts, an architectural style which is typical for the province of North Brabant. The village green used to serve as a market place. The Sint Jans market is still held here on the last weekend of June since 1977.

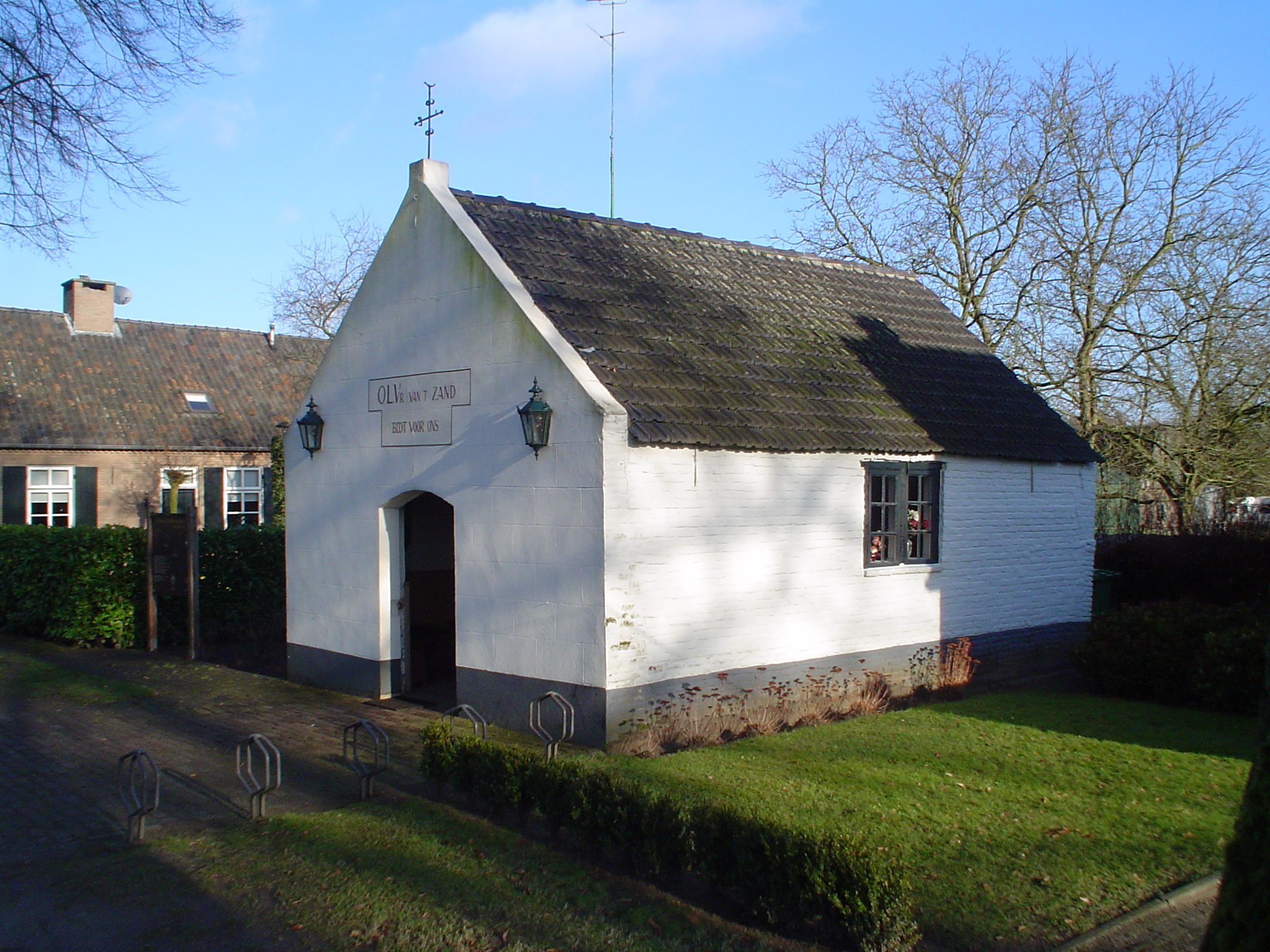
The chapel

At the village green is the chapel located, dedicated to Onze Lieve Vrouw van 't Zand, or Our Lady of the Sand. The community of Zandoerle is officially the owner of the chapel. There used to be a wooden church on the village green of Zandoerle in the twelfth and thirteenth century. This church was replaced by a chapel around the year 1250. From 1672 until 1798, this chapel was in use as a so-called schuurkerk, a place where the Catholic Church was allowed to hold services. The current chapel is in use since 1807. The rosary has become a common practice in the chapel since 1817. The chapel received repairs around 1960.

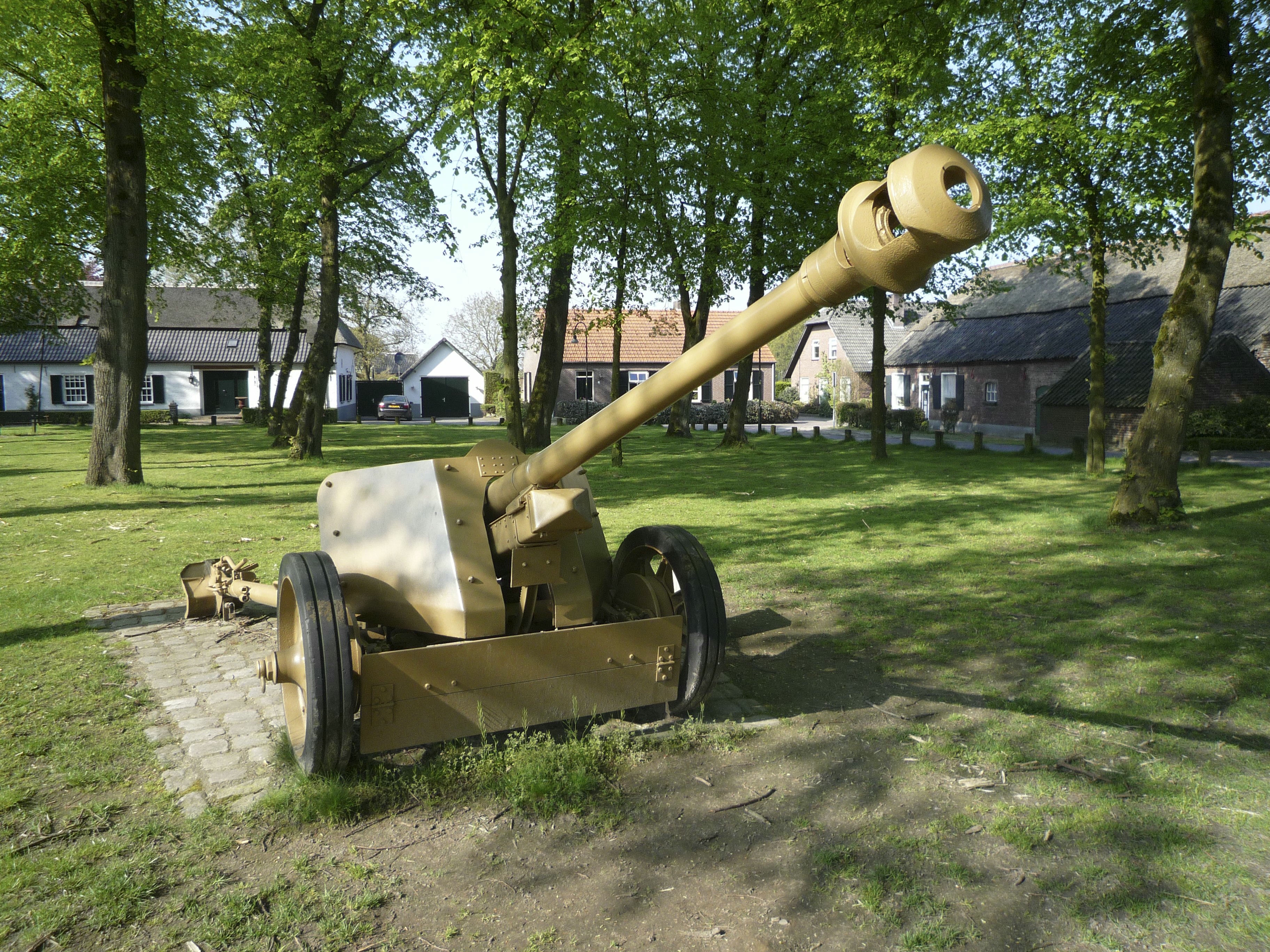
The German gun as described.

At the centre of the village green a cannon is positioned. This German anti-tank gun is of the type 7.5 cm PaK 40 and was used during World War II. It was used by the Germans to fire from the nearby village Wintelre in the direction of Oerle. The cannon was captured by the allied forces in September 1944 and put on the village green of Zandoerle during the liberation festivities of May 13, 1945. Some repairs were performed on the cannon in 1971. In 2006, the cannon was supposed to play a part in the movie Zwartboek of director Paul Verhoeven. However, this plan was cancelled as it turned out that the cannon was in a bad condition. It received repairs later that year.

One of the farms in Zandoerle is called the Dingbank. This former courthouse was built around the year 1600.
