= Kruisstraat, Halderberge =

Coordinates: 51°35′18″N 04°34′00″E

Kruisstraat is a hamlet in the south of the Netherlands. It is located in the municipality of Halderberge, North Brabant, between the towns of Oudenbosch and Hoeven.
