= Kruisstraat, Roosendaal =

Hamlet in Roosendaal

Coordinates: 51°30′39″N 4°27′55″E

Kruisstraat is a hamlet in the Dutch province of North Brabant. It is located in the municipality of Roosendaal, about 3 km (2 mi) southwest of the city centre.
