= Schoot, Veldhoven =

Coordinates: 51°24′03″N 5°22′47″E

Schoot
- Hamlet
- Interactive map of Schoot
- Country: Netherlands
- Province: North Brabant
- Municipality: Veldhoven
- Time zone: UTC+1 (CET)
  - Summer (DST): UTC+2 (CEST)

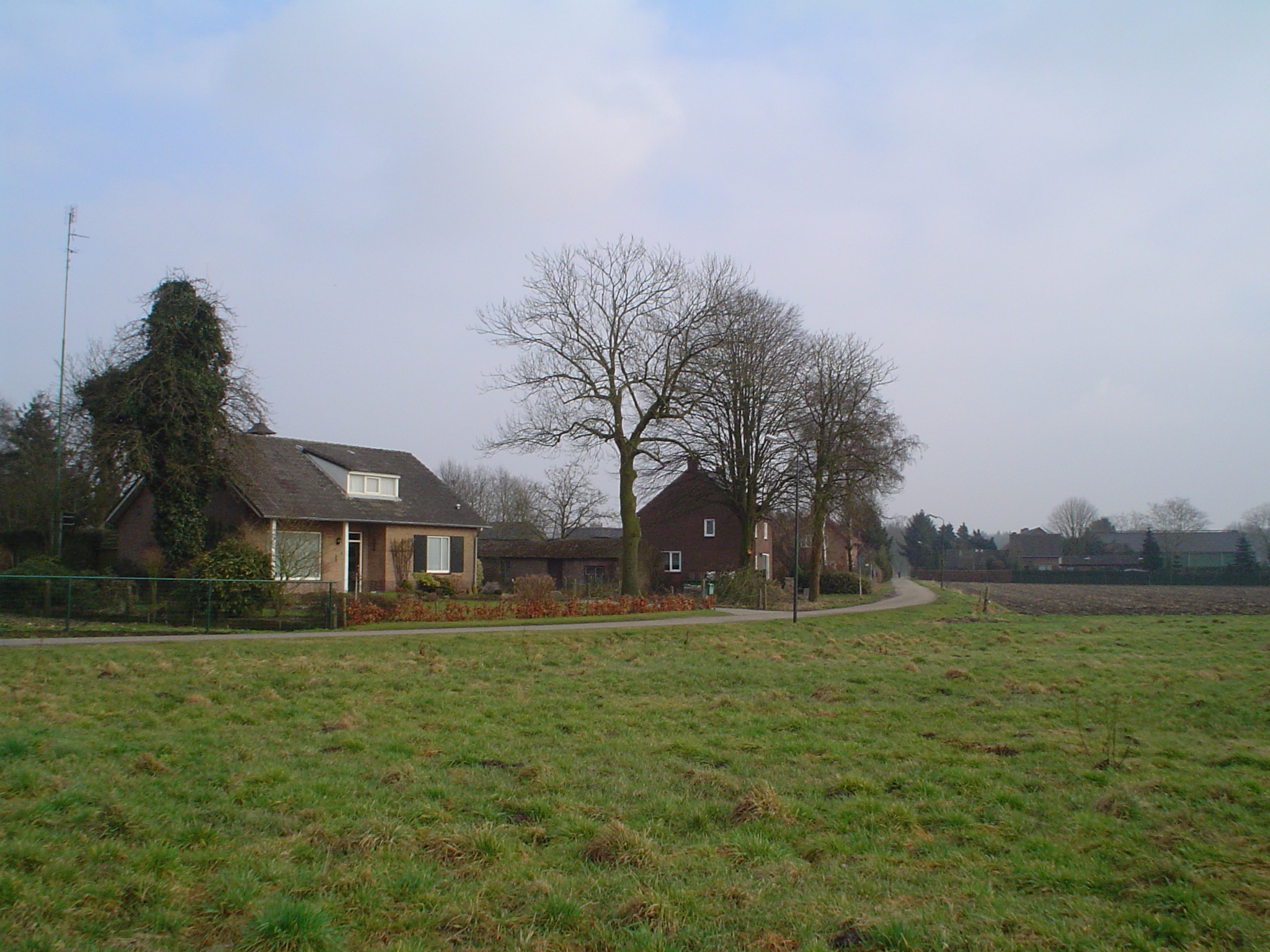
View from the Knegselseweg on the hamlet Schoot

Schoot is a hamlet in the municipality of Veldhoven in the province of North Brabant, the Netherlands. The hamlet is located on a street with the same name. This street is a side street of the Knegselseweg, the road connecting Veldhoven with the village Knegsel. East of Schoot lies the residential area Pegbroeken. West of Schoot flows the small stream the Poelenloop and lies the forest area Oeyenbos.

== History ==
The name Schoot refers to a high corner of land amidst lowland. In case of the hamlet near Veldhoven, this is probably related to the ridge of geestland located north of the stream Gender.

In the Middle Ages, there used to be a farm in Schoot which was a leasehold estate of the Abbey of Echternach. This farm was some distance away from the other farms in the hamlet and was known under the name Ter Schoot. Its name was first mentioned in a leasehold letter from the year 1446. The books of Echternach list Ludekijn van der Schoet and Jan Jans sJonghen as the oldest owners. The farm received the name Ledige Hoeve in the seventeenth century. Later on there were two houses on this location, which were both demolished in the eighteenth century.

In the nineteenth century the hamlet Schoot consisted of twenty houses. The hamlet became connected with a stone paved road when in 1935 a road made out of clinker brick was constructed between Knegsel and Veldhoven.
