= Nevile =

Nevile is a surname and given name. Notable people with the name include:

Given name:

- Nevile Bland KCMG KCVO (1886–1972), British diplomat, Envoy Extraordinary and Minister Plenipotentiary to the Netherlands during WWII
- Nevile Butler KCMG CVO (1893–1973), British diplomat
- Thomas Nevile Carter (1851–1879), English amateur sportsman who played football for England
- Nevile Davidson, DL, ChStJ (1899–1976), senior Church of Scotland minister
- Nevile Gwynne, British writer who wrote the book Gwynne's Grammar
- Nevile Henderson GCMG (1882–1942), British diplomat, ambassador of the United Kingdom to Germany from 1937 to 1939
- Peter Nevile Wake Jennings, CVO (born 1934), British public servant, Serjeant-at-Arms of the House of Commons
- Nevile Lodge OBE (1918–1989), New Zealand cartoonist
- Nevile Lubbock KCMG (1839–1914), President of the West India Committee and an English amateur cricketer
- Nevile Wilkinson, KCVO (1869–1940), British officer of arms, British Army officer, author and a dolls house designer

Surname:

- Bernard Nevile (1888–1916), English first-class cricketer
- Christopher Nevile (1631–1692), English Member of Parliament
- Henry Nevile (Lord Lieutenant of Lincolnshire), KCVO, KStJ, JP, DL (1920–1996), English farmer, Lord Lieutenant of Lincolnshire
- Liddy Nevile (born 1947), Australian academic and a pioneer in using computers for education in Australia
- Mildred Nevile MBE (1927–2012), lifelong Catholic activist against poverty and injustice
- Pran Nevile (1922–2018), Indian author of books including Lahore: A Sentimental Journey
- Thomas Nevile (died 1615), English clergyman and academic, Dean of Canterbury (1597–1615), Master of Trinity College, Cambridge (1593–1615)

== See also ==
- Nevil (disambiguation)
- Nevill (disambiguation)
- Neville (disambiguation)
- Néville
