= Neville (name) =

De Neville, later Neville, is an English masculine given name, toponymic surname and the name of several places. All are derived from "new town" in Norman and French word. As a given name, it is chiefly used in the United Kingdom, Canada, Australia, South Africa, and Ireland.

It may refer to:

== House of Neville ==
The House of Neville was a powerful noble family of England that was prominent in the medieval period. Its members include:

- Alan de Neville (forester) (died c. 1176), Chief Forester of England
- Alan de Neville (landholder) (died after 1168), medieval landholder
- Alexander Neville (bishop) (1340–1392), Archbishop of York
- Anne Neville (1456–1485), Queen of England, consort of Richard III
- Cecily Neville (1415–1495), Duchess of York, mother of Edward IV and Richard III
- George Neville (archbishop) (1432–1476), Archbishop of York
- Henry Neville (died 1615) (1562–1615), English politician
- Hugh de Neville (died 1234), Chief Forester and sheriff
- Isabel Neville (1451–1476), Duchess of Clarence, daughter of the Kingmaker
- Katherine Neville, Baroness Hastings (1442–1503)
- Ralph Neville, 1st Earl of Westmorland (1364–1425)
- Ralph Neville (died 1244), Lord Chancellor of England, Archbishop of Canterbury-elect
- Richard Neville, 5th Earl of Salisbury (1400–1460)
- Richard Neville, 16th Earl of Warwick (1428–1471), known as the Kingmaker
- William Neville, Earl of Kent (1410–1463)

== Surname ==
- Aaron Neville (born 1941), singer, songwriter, and multi-instrumentalist, member of The Neville brothers
- Adam Nevill (born 1969), British writer
- Anita Neville (born 1942), Canadian politician
- A. O. Neville (1875–1954), Australian civil servant
- Art Neville (1937–2019), singer and keyboardist, member of The Neville Brothers
- Arthel Neville (born 1962), American journalist
- Charles Neville (musician) (1938–2018), saxophonist, member of The Neville Brothers
- Cynthia Neville, Canadian historian
- Cyril Neville (born 1948), singer and percussionist, member of The Neville Brothers
- Dan Neville (politician) (born 1946), Irish politician
- Edgar Neville (1899–1967), Spanish film director
- Emily Neville (1919–1997), American author
- Eric Harold Neville (1889–1961), English mathematician
- Gary Neville (born 1975), English football player and brother of Phil Neville
- Henry Neville, multiple people
- Hensley Anthony Neville (1957–1992), Singaporean convicted murderer
- Ivan Neville (born 1959), singer and keyboardist, later member of The Neville Brothers; son of Aaron
- Jill Neville (1932–1997), Australian novelist
- Joan Neville (alleged witch) (died 1660), English woman executed for witchcraft
- John Neville (actor) (1925–2011), British actor
- John Neville (general) (1731–1803), American soldier
- Joseph Neville (1730–1819), American politician
- Joy Neville (born 1983), Irish rugby union player and referee
- Katherine Neville (author), American author
- Keith Neville (1884–1959), American politician
- Margot Neville pseudonym of Goyder sisters, Australian writers
- Mark Neville (born 1966), British photographer
- Mason Neville, baseball player
- Mike Neville (newsreader) (1936–2017), British television presenter
- Neville Neville (1949–2015), cricketer and father of footballers Gary and Phil Neville
- Paul Neville (politician) (1940–2019), Australian politician
- Peter Neville, Australian rules footballer
- Phil Neville (born 1977), English football player and brother of Gary Neville
- Presley Neville (1756–1818), American soldier
- Ralph Neville (MP) (1848–1918), British politician and judge
- Richard Neville (singer) (born 1979), British singer
- Richard Neville (writer) (1941–2016), Australian writer
- Roger Neville (1895–1986), British military aviator
- Stéphane Neville (born 1973), French singer
- Tracey Neville (born 1977), English netball player
- Wendell Cushing Neville (1870–1930), American Marine Corps general and Medal of Honor recipient
- William Neville (representative) (1843–1909), American politician

== Given name ==
- Neville Alexander (1936–2012), South African activist
- Neville Ashenheim (1900−1984), Jamaican diplomat
- Neville Bonner (1922−1999), Australian politician
- Neville Brand (1920−1992), American actor
- Neville Brody (born 1957), British graphic designer
- Neville Buswell (1943–2019), British actor
- Neville Cardus (1888−1975), British writer and critic
- Neville Chamberlain (1869−1940), British politician
- Neville Dawes (1926–1984), Nigerian-born writer of Jamaican parentage
- Neville Duke (1922−2007), British aviator
- Neville Fernando (1931–2021), Sri Lankan Sinhala doctor, politician
- Neville Gallimore (born 1997), American football player
- Neville Glover (born 1955), Australian rugby league footballer
- Neville Goddard (1905–1972) American writer and mystic
- Neville Jansz, Sri Lankan diplomat
- N. U. Jayawardena (1908–2002), Sri Lankan Sinhala economist, senator, bank governor
- Neville Kanakaratna (1923–1999), Sri Lankan Sinhala diplomat
- Neville Karunatilake (1930–2010), governor of the Central Bank of Sri Lanka
- Neville Laski (1890−1969), British judge
- Neville Livingston (1947–2021), better known as Bunny Wailer, Jamaican musician
- Neville Liyanage (born 1975), Sri Lankan Sinhala cricketer
- Neville Marriner (1924–2016), English conductor and violinist
- Neville Neville (1949–2015), cricketer, father of footballers Gary and Phil Neville
- Neville Patterson (1916–1987), chief justice of the Supreme Court of Mississippi
- Neville Samarakoon (1919–1990), Sri Lankan judge
- Neville Sellwood (1922−1962), Australian jockey
- Neville Stamp (born 1981), English former professional footballer
- Neville Staple (born 1955), British singer
- Neville Southall (born 1958), Welsh former professional footballer
- Neville Tong (1934–2019), English cyclist
- Neville Wadia (1911−1996), Indian businessman
- Neville Wanless (1931–2020), English broadcaster
- Neville Wran (1926−2014), Australian politician

== Fictional characters ==
- Neville, a character from Need for Speed: Carbon
- Kate Neville, a character in the Marvel Comics universe
- Robert Neville, a character in the 1954 novel I Am Legend by Richard Matheson
- Neville, a character from Thomas and Friends
- Neville Ashworth, a character in the television series Hollyoaks
- Neville Flynn, a character in the 2006 film Snakes on a Plane
- Neville Hope, a character in Auf Wiedersehen, Pet
- Neville Longbottom, a character in the Harry Potter series
- Neville Sinclair, a character in the 1991 film The Rocketeer
- Nev the Bear, character from CBBC
- Neville McPhee, a character in the Australian soap opera Home and Away
- Neville, a character in Luigi's Mansion
- Major Neville, in Walter Scott's The Antiquary
- Neville, an English professional wrestler now signed to AEW as Pac

== See also ==
- Nevil (disambiguation)
- Nevill (disambiguation)
- Nevills (disambiguation)
