= Pierre de Bréauté =

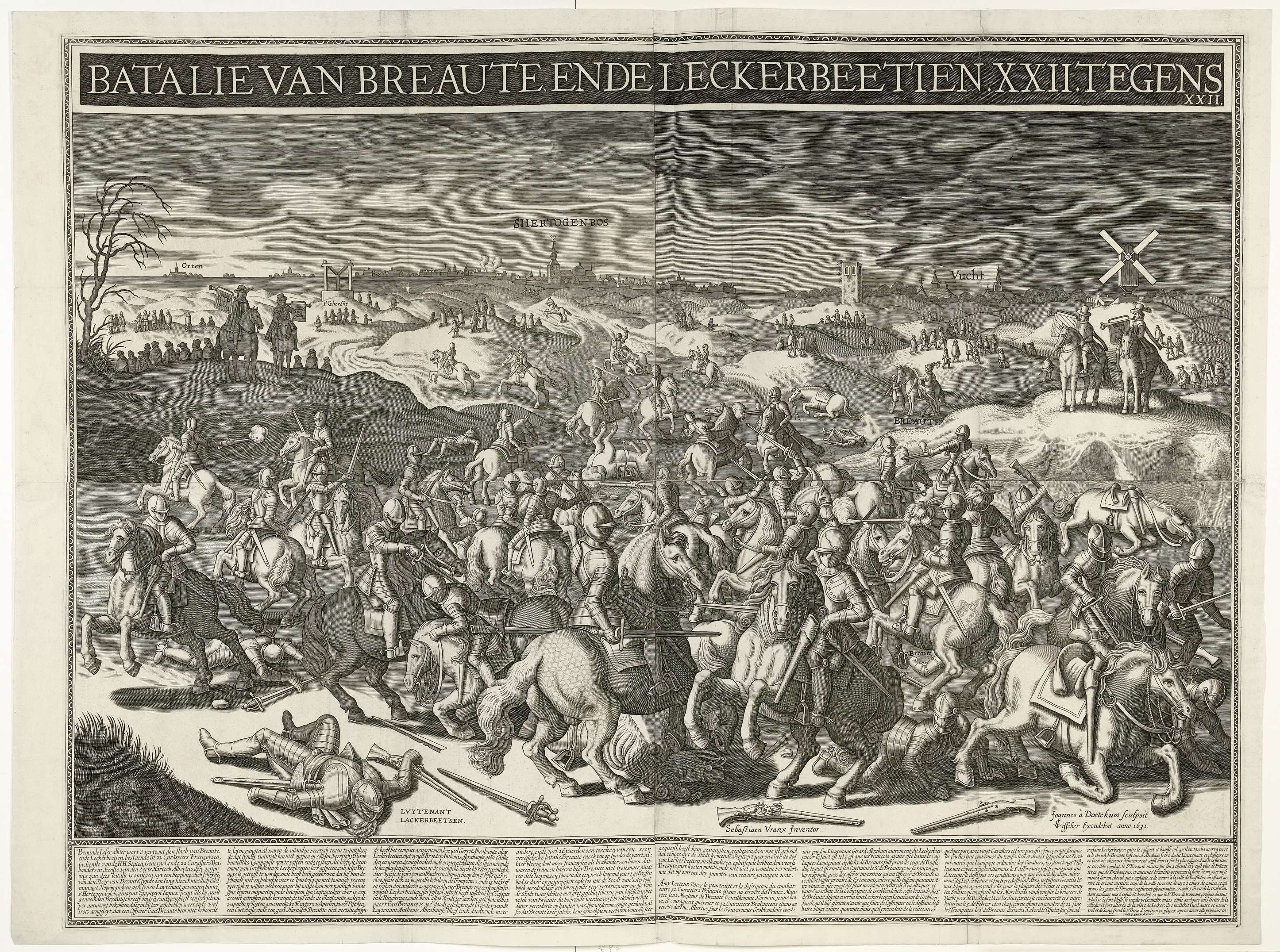
- Battle of Lekkerbeetje (5 February 1600), engraved by Joannes Doetecum II after Sebastian Vrancx, published by Claes Jansz. Visscher II (1631). Pierre de Bréauté is shown remounting in the right background.
- Born: 1580
- Died: 5 February 1600 (aged 19–20); Vught
- Burial place: Néville
- Military career
- Allegiance: Dutch Republic
- Conflicts: Battle of Lekkerbeetje

Pierre de Bréauté, lord of Bréauté (1580–1600) was a nobleman from Normandy who died at the age of 19 as a cavalry captain in the service of the Dutch Republic, in a cavalry duel known as the Battle of Lekkerbeetje.

In the winter of 1599–1600, a lull in the campaigning season, troops from the Army of Flanders garrisoned in 's-Hertogenbosch brought in a French prisoner, a cavalry lieutenant in the service of the Republic. When the prisoner wrote to his captain, Pierre de Bréauté, asking that money be sent to ransom him, Bréauté replied that he should be ashamed at having been captured, since any one of his men should be worth two of the enemy. Dutch cavalry lieutenant Gerard Abrahams, hearing of the letter's content, challenged Bréauté to meet him on Vught Heath with equal numbers to put his boast to the test.

The two officers obtained permission from their commanders, and the combat took place on 5 February 1600. Abrahams was the first casualty, being shot through the neck by Bréauté in the first charge, and his brother also died in the encounter. Bréauté had his horse shot from under him twice, was wounded and made prisoner. He was killed in cold blood, three quarters of an hour after having been captured, in revenge for the death of the Abrahams brothers.

Bréauté was buried in Néville on 8 March 1600. A eulogy, addressed to his wife, Charlotte de Harlay, and his mother, Susanne de Monchy–Senarpont, was published as Deux consolations de M. Jean de Rouen, aux deux très-sages et très-vertueuses Dames de Bréauté, mère et femme. Sur l'assassin, fait nouvellement, de sang froit, a leur fils et mari, le jeune Seigneur de Bréauté (Paris, Philippe du Pré, 1600). He had married Charlotte de Harlay on 17 December 1596.
