= Battle of Lekkerbeetje =

1600 cavalry battle in the Netherlands

- Part of the Eighty Years' War
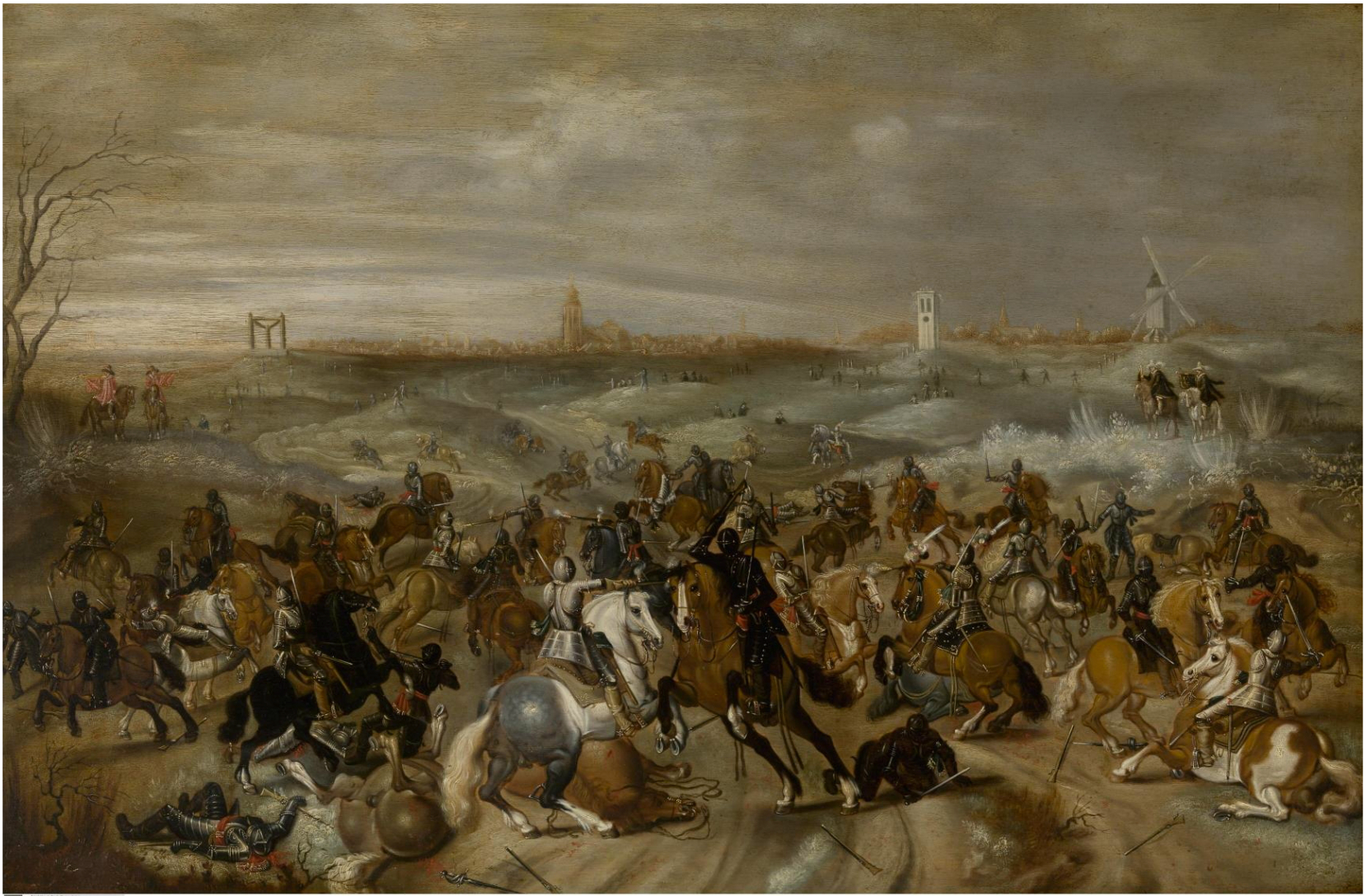
- Battle of Bréauté and Lekkerbeetje, by Sebastian Vrancx
Date	5 February 1600
Location	Vught Heath outside 's-Hertogenbosch, (present-day Netherlands)
Result	Spanish victory

Belligerents
Dutch Republic	Spain

Commanders and leaders
(Dutch Republic) Pierre de Bréauté	(Spain) Gerard Abrahams

Strength
22 cavalrymen	22 cavalrymen

Casualties and losses
14	5

The Battle of Lekkerbeetje or Lekkerbeetken (5 February 1600) was a cavalry duel fought by pre-arrangement on Vughterheide near 's-Hertogenbosch, North Brabant, between 22 Brabantine cavalrymen loyal to Albert VII, Archduke of Austria, garrisoned in 's-Hertogenbosch, and 22 French cavalrymen serving in the army of the Dutch Republic.

== Event ==
In the winter of 1599-1600, a lull in the campaigning season, soldiers of the Army of Flanders garrisoned in 's-Hertogenbosch, commanded by Anthonie II Schetz, Baron of Grobbendonk, brought in a French prisoner, a cavalry lieutenant in the service of the Republic. When the prisoner wrote to his captain, Pierre de Bréauté, asking that money be sent to ransom him, Bréauté replied that he should be ashamed at having been captured, since any one of his men should be worth two of the enemy. Gerard Abrahams, a lieutenant of cuirassiers serving under Grobbendonk, heard of the letter's content. He challenged Bréauté to meet him on Vught Heath with equal numbers to put his boast to the test.

The two officers obtained permission from their commanders, and the combat took place on 5 February 1600. Each brought twenty-one cavalrymen and two heralds in support. The battle began at a trumpet signal from the heralds. Abrahams was the first casualty, being shot through the neck in the first charge. His brother also died in the engagement. Bréauté had his horse shot from under him twice, was wounded and made prisoner. He was killed in cold blood, three quarters of an hour after having been captured, in revenge for the death of the Abrahams brothers.

== Commemoration ==
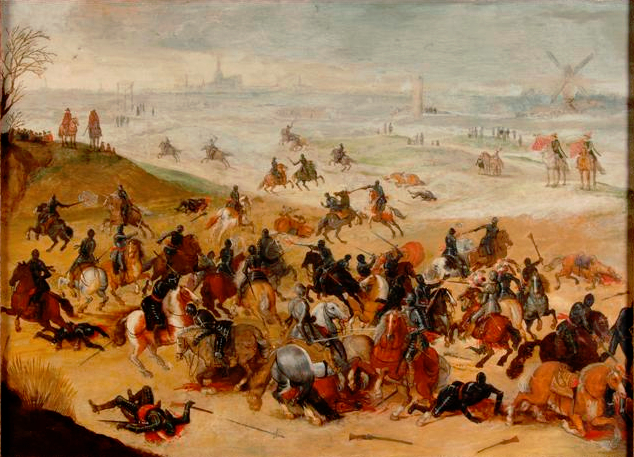
Battle of Lekkerbeetje, attributed to Esaias van de Velde.

The fighting of a mass cavalry duel was a practice more familiar from chivalric romances than from the warfare of the time, and the small engagement made a great impression on contemporaries. A pamphlet account of the encounter was put out almost immediately as Histoire du combat du 5 février 1600, aux environs de Bois-le-Duc, entre le seigneur de Breauté, avec 21 soldats au service des hollandois, & Gerard Abrahams avec aussi 21 soldats au service de Leurs Altezes (Brussels, Rutger Velpius, 1600). The event was commemorated in songs, poems, histories, paintings and prints.

There are paintings of the battle by Joost Cornelisz Droochsloot, Sebastian Vrancx, Simon Johannes van Douw and Gerrit van Santen, and one attributed to Esaias van de Velde.
