= Neville =

Neville may refer to:

== Places ==
- Neville, New South Wales, Australia
- Neville, Saskatchewan, Canada
- Néville, in the Seine-Maritime department, France
- Néville-sur-Mer, in the Manche department, France
- Neville, Ohio, USA
- Neville Township, Pennsylvania, USA

== People and fictional characters ==
- Neville (name), including a list of people and characters with the given name or surname
- House of Neville, a noble family of England
- Neville (wrestler), ring name of Benjamin Satterley, a British professional wrestler
- Naomi Neville, pseudonym of American songwriter and musician Allen Toussaint (1938–2015)

== Other uses ==
- USS Neville (APA-9), a Heywood-class attack transport in the United States Navy
- Concrete Aboriginal, a lawn ornament in Australia also known as a "Neville"

== See also ==
- Fifehead Neville, Dorset, England
- Tarring Neville, East Sussex, England
- Neville's algorithm, used for polynomial interpolation
- The Neville Brothers, American band
- Naville, a surname
- Nevil (disambiguation)
- Nevill (disambiguation)
- Nevills (disambiguation)
