= Nevell =

Nevell is a surname of Norman origin. It is a variation of the surname Neville.

- John Nevell (died 1697), English vice-admiral
- Stanley R. Nevell, English architect; see Market Street, Cambridge
- William Nevell (1916–1978), English cricketer

== See also ==
- Nevelle Clarke, American football player
- Neville (disambiguation)
