= Gerard Abrahams =

Gerard Abrahams van Houwelingen
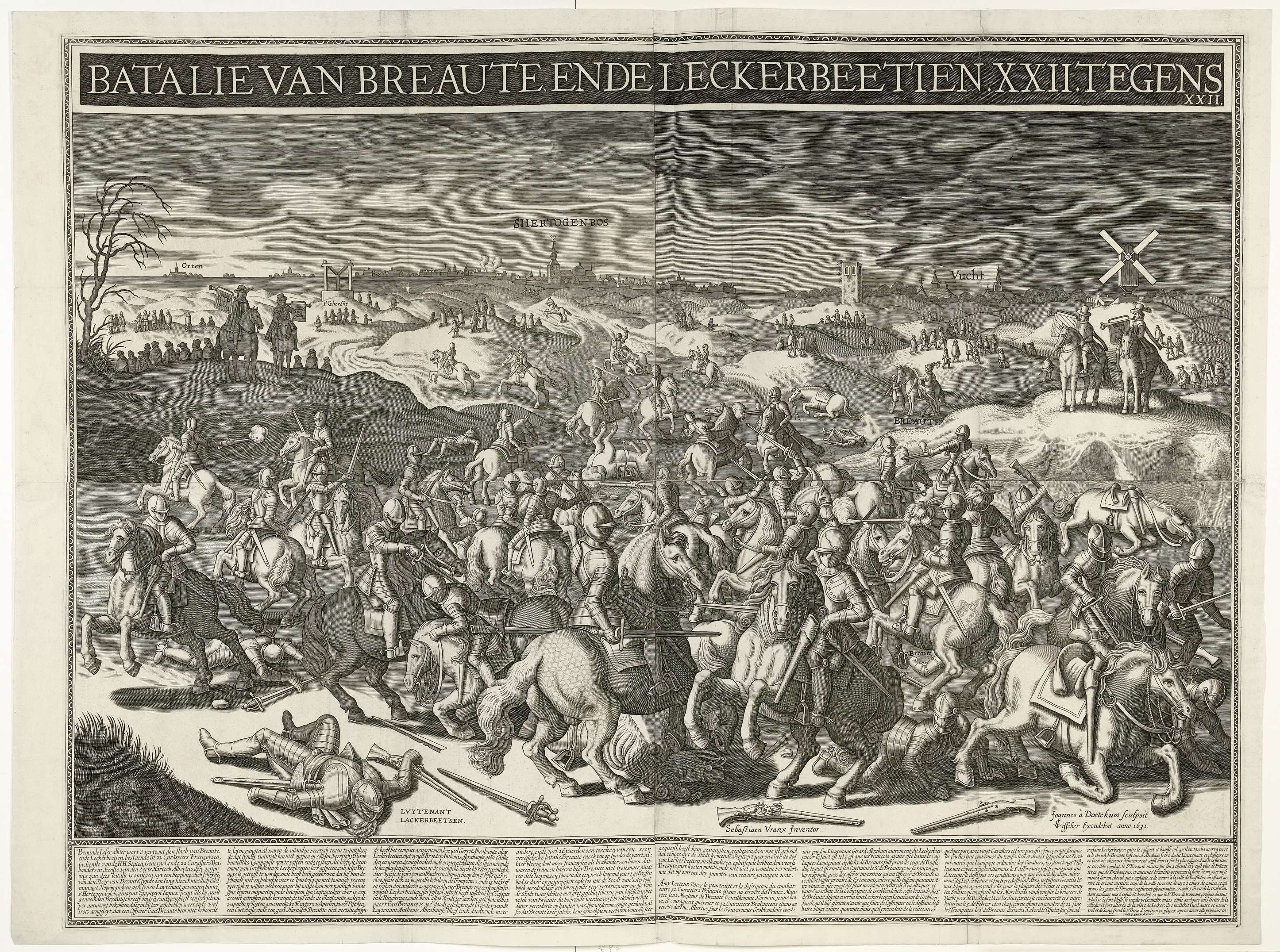
- Battle of Lekkerbeetje (5 February 1600), engraved by Joannes Doetecum II after Sebastian Vrancx, published by Claes Jansz. Visscher II (1631). Gerard Abrahams ("Lieutenant Lekkerbeetje") lying dead at bottom left.
- Born: 's-Hertogenbosch
- Died: 5 February 1600; Vught
- Military career
- Allegiance: Dutch Republic; Spanish Netherlands
- Nickname: Lekkerbeetje (sweet-tooth)
- Conflicts: Capture of Geertruidenberg (1589); Battle of Lekkerbeetje

Gerard Abrahams van Houwelingen (died 5 February 1600), known as Lekkerbeetje ("sweet-tooth") was a Brabantine cavalry officer in the armies of the Dutch Republic and later in the Army of Flanders.

Abrahams, a native of 's-Hertogenbosch, had first served the Dutch Republic, but being among the soldiers who delivered Geertruidenberg to Alexander Farnese, Duke of Parma in 1589 he was declared an outlaw by the States. He went over to the Army of Flanders and served as a lieutenant of cuirassiers under Anthonie Schetz, Baron of Grobbendonk, the governor of 's-Hertogenbosch.

In the winter of 1599-1600, a lull in the campaigning season, the Dutch cuirassiers garrisoned in 's-Hertogenbosch brought in a French prisoner, a cavalry lieutenant in the service of the Republic. When the prisoner wrote to his captain, Pierre de Bréauté, asking that money be sent to ransom him, Bréauté replied that he should be ashamed at having been captured, since any one of his men should be worth two of the enemy. Abrahams, hearing of the letter's content, challenged Bréauté to meet him on Vught Heath with equal numbers to put his boast to the test.

The two officers obtained permission from their commanders, and the combat took place on 5 February 1600. Abrahams was the first casualty, being shot through the neck in the first charge.
