= Nevill =

Nevill is an English toponymic surname derived from Neville. The last name Nevill is of Anglo-Norman origin, meaning "new town" or "new settlement" (from the Old French words neu(f), meaning new, and ville, meaning settlement or town).

May refer to:

== People ==
British peerage

- Nevill baronets, two extinct creations, one of 1661 and one of 1675
- House of Nevill (Note: the spellings "Nevill" and "Neville" have both been used, often interchangeably)
- Viscount Nevill, a junior title of the Marquess of Abergavenny
- Edward Nevill, 7th Baron Bergavenny (c. 1526 - 1588)
- Edward Nevill, 8th Baron Bergavenny (c. 1550 – 1622)
- John Nevill, 10th Baron Bergavenny (c. 1614 - 1662)
- Edward Nevill, 15th Baron Bergavenny (c. 1705 - 1724)
- John Nevill, 3rd Earl of Abergavenny (1789-1845)
- William Nevill, 4th Earl of Abergavenny (1792-1868)
- Reginald Nevill, 2nd Marquess of Abergavenny (1853-1927)
- Lord Richard Nevill (1862–1939)
- Guy Larnach-Nevill, 4th Marquess of Abergavenny (1883-1954)
- John Nevill, 5th Marquess of Abergavenny (1914-2000)
- Patricia Nevill, Marchioness of Abergavenny (1915-2005), friend and Lady of the Bedchamber to Elizabeth II
- Lord Rupert Nevill (1923-1982)
- Christopher Nevill, 6th Marquess of Abergavenny (born 1955)

Given name

- Nevill Catlin (1634-1702), English landowner and politician
- Nevill Coghill (VC) (1852-1879), Irish recipient of the Victoria Cross
- Nevill Coghill (1899-1980), English literary scholar, known for his modern English version of Geoffrey Chaucer's Canterbury Tales
- Nevill Drury (1947-2013), English-born Australian editor, publisher and author
- John Nevill Eliot (died 2003), English entomologist
- Philip Nevill Green (born 1953), British business executive
- Nevill Lee (1898-1978), English cricketer
- Nevill Francis Mott (1905-1996), English physicist who won the Nobel Prize for Physics in 1977 for his work on the electronic structure of magnetic and disordered systems
- Nevill Smyth (1868-1941), major-general in the British Army, recipient of the Victoria Cross
- Nevill Vintcent (1902–1942), South African aviator and airline founder
- Nevill Willmer (1902-2001), British histologist

Surname

- Adam Nevill (born 1969), English writer of supernatural horror stories
- Amanda Nevill (born 1957), English arts administrator
- Arthur de Terrotte Nevill (1899-1985), New Zealand military aviator and administrator
- Arthur Jones-Nevill (c. 1712 – 1771), Irish politician
- Bernard Nevill (1930–2019), British designer and academic
- Caroline Emily Nevill (1829–1887), early British photographer
- Charles William Nevill (1815-1888), Welsh owner of a copper smelting company and a Conservative Party politician
- Christopher Nevill (1800-1847), English cricketer
- Cosmo Nevill (1907-2002), British Army officer
- Craig Nevill-Manning (active from 2001), New Zealand computer scientist
- Lady Dorothy Nevill (1826-1913), English writer, hostess, horticulturist and plant collector
- Edmund Neville Nevill (1849-1940), British-born South African astronomer
- Geoffrey Nevill (died 1885), British malacologist who worked at the Indian Museum, Kolkata, brother of Hugh
- Geoffrey Nevill (died 1972), New Zealand public servant and Resident Commissioner of the Cook Islands
- George Nevill (disambiguation), multiple people
- Henry Nevill (disambiguation), multiple people
- Hugh Nevill (1847-1897), British civil servant, known for his scholarship and studies of the culture of Sri Lanka, brother of Geoffrey
- Jim Nevill (1927-2007), British policeman, head of the Scotland Yard Bomb Squad
- Luke Nevill (born 1986), Australian basketball player
- Mark Nevill (born 1947), Australian politician
- Mary Nevill (disambiguation), multiple people
- P. B. Nevill (1887-1975), English scoutmaster, recipient of the Silver Wolf Award
- Peter Nevill (born 1985), Australian cricketer
- Richard Nevill (1654-1720), Irish politician
- Richard Nevill (1743–1822), Irish politician
- Samuel Nevill (1837–1921), first Anglican Bishop of the Diocese of Dunedin in Dunedin, New Zealand
- Ted Nevill (active from 1989), British writer on military history
- Thomas Nevill (by 1484 - 1542), English politician, of the House of Nevill
- Thomas Nevill (priest) (1901–1980), English Anglican priest and school teacher
- Wilfred Nevill (1894-1916), British soldier, known for initiating the "Football Charge" on the first day of the Battle of the Somme (1916)
- William Nevill (disambiguation), multiple people

== Places ==
- Nevill Bay, a waterway in Kivalliq Region, Nunavut, Canada
- Nevill Ground, a cricket venue located in Royal Tunbridge Wells, Kent, England
- Nevill Holt, a hamlet and civil parish in the Harborough district of Leicestershire, England
  - Nevill Holt Opera, an arts festival held annually since 2013 at Nevill Holt

== Other uses ==
- The Nevill Feast, a single-movement orchestral composition of 2003 by American composer Christopher Rouse
- Nevill Hall Hospital, a district general hospital in Abergavenny, north Monmouthshire, Wales

== See also ==
- Nevil (disambiguation)
- Neville (disambiguation)
- Nevills (disambiguation)
