= De Heer Kocken =

Coordinates: 51°39′37.72″N 5°17′57.35″E

- Interactive map of De Heer Kocken

Restaurant information
- Established: 1998
- Head chef: John Kocken
- Food type: French
- Rating: Michelin Guide
- Location: Taalstraat 173, Vught, 5261 DB, Netherlands
- Seating capacity: 50
- Website: Official website

De Heer Kocken is a restaurant in Vught, Netherlands. It is a fine dining restaurant that was awarded one Michelin star for the period 2009–present.

GaultMillau awarded the restaurant 13 out of 20 points.

Head chef of De Heer Kocken is John Kocken.

== See also ==
- List of Michelin starred restaurants in the Netherlands
