= Progressio =

International development charity (1940–2017)

Progressio was an international development charity that enabled poor communities to solve their own problems by support from skilled workers. The organisation attempted to influence decisionmakers, secular and religious alike, to support liberation movements and to guard against human rights abuses. It also lobbied legislators to change policies that keep people poor. It had been known earlier as The Catholic Institute for International Relations and the Sword of the Spirit.

On 14 September 2016, Progressio announced that, due to funding issues, it was shutting down operations. It closed in March 2017.

== History ==
Cardinal Arthur Hinsley founded Sword of the Spirit in August 1940. The organization was later known as the Catholic Institute of International Relations (CIIR) and then became Progressio. It was credited as "Probably Hinsley's most memorable act".

Its long-term goal was to put into effect Christian social teachings as an alternative to totalitarianism and extremism of all ideologies. Its short-term goal was to promote the awareness and the acceptance of the five Peace Points proposed by Pope Pius XII soon after his election in 1939; like: the defence of small nations, the right to life, disarmament, some new kind of League of Nations and a plea for the moral principles of justice and love.

Although founded by the cardinal, the movement was intended to be a lay organization. The first vice-president was Christopher Dawson, but practical organization was in the hands of Richard O'Sullivan KC; Barbara Ward; and Professor A. C. F. Beales of London University and his wife, Freda.

The aims behind the movement were set out in a letter to The Times (21 December 1941) that was signed jointly by the Archbishops of Canterbury and York (Cosmo Gordon Lang and William Temple), by Cardinal Hinsley and by the Moderator of the Free Churches (W. H. Armstrong). Hinsley, hoping to make the movement ecumenical, organised two interdenominational mass meetings in London in May 1941, but in the course of 1941, the Vatican insisted for Catholic and Protestant social movements to be segregated, and a parallel movement under the name Religion and Life was inaugurated for non-Catholics.

In 1965, the name Catholic Institute for International Relations (CIIR) was adopted. In early 1967 Mildred Mary Nevile, who had been working at CIIR since 1958, became the secretary-general of the CIIR and proposed change. She championed the idea that it would concentrate on the development required to end poverty in the world. Causes that it had previously championed such as anti-racism and world peace could be left to other organisations. She believed that the institution had to show solidarity with the countries with which it was working to encourage their participation.

The organisation was active in South America in the late 1970s, an early focus for the institution. It knew about the terrible condition in the tin mines in Bolivia and its knowledge to persuade the UK government to not give the mines a grant. Its knowledge the conditions in El Salvador made it manage to prevent the sale of arms to the regimr. In Africa, it quietly channelled funds to anti-apartheid groups, including funds supplied by the Swedish government.

In 1985, Nevile became an MBE for her work. Deciding that her priorities lay elsewhere, she left the CIIR and went on to take a degree at Leeds University.

On 1 January 2006, CIIR changed its name to Progressio.

Progressio development workers had a minimum of two years' work experience, often with a background in training that was formal or informal.

Throughout its history, the organisation attempted to influence decisionmakers, secular and religious alike, to support liberation movements and to guard against human rights abuses.

In March 2009, it had around 90 development workers in post coming from 30 different countries. Progressio had a sister organisation, Progressio Ireland, which operated out of Dublin and worked in tandem with Progressio on its global projects.
