= Pierre Hermans =

Dutch field hockey player

Lambertus Maria Petrus ("Pierre") Hermans (born 16 May 1953 in Vught, North Brabant) is a former field hockey goalkeeper from The Netherlands, who was a member of the Dutch National Men's Team that finished sixth in the 1984 Summer Olympics in Los Angeles. Hermans earned a total number of 86 caps, in the years 1977–1984. After the Los Angeles Games he retired from international competition.
