= Progressio Ireland =

Progressio Ireland is an international development organisation that works toward "sustainable development and the eradication of poverty in Latin America, the Caribbean, Africa, the Middle East and Asia".

Founded in Dublin in 2004, the organisation stresses a “skill-share” approach to development practices in n supporting the work of local organisations by providing the tools and education to develop long-term solutions to barriers to sustainable development and resource management in its 10 project countries. Progressio employs "development workers", who work on site with the local organisations and communities and share their skills. It emphasises continuing education, rather than other shorter-term solutions, to development issues. Progressio aims to provide communities with the skills and knowledge necessary to solve the problems that both stand in the way of development and marginalise the poor.

== History ==
Progressio Ireland is a sister company of Progressio, a UK-based international development charity. Progressio was founded in 1940 as “Sword of the Spirit,” a movement aimed at translating the principles of Catholic social teaching into practical action. In 1965 the name was changed to the Catholic Institute for International Relations (CIIR). The name “Progressio” is taken from the 1967 Encyclical of Pope Paul VI, Populorum Progressio, or, “the development of peoples.” The document stresses social responsibility toward a just world and confronts the challenges to development. Progressio Ireland was founded in 2004 with the purpose of promoting sustainable development techniques in underdeveloped countries, providing the tools for sustainable self-governance, and contributing to debate on development issues within Ireland.

== Philosophy ==
The vision of Progressio Ireland is to “bring about a just world, where people can have life in all its fullness, where human rights are respected, where all have their basic needs met and can exert control over their lives.” The organisation is founded on Catholic Social Teaching and Progressio endorses this history and relationship. However, Progressio Ireland itself is not formally part of the Catholic Church. They provide their services to all people of diverse backgrounds and beliefs. Progressio Ireland states: “We work with people of all faiths and none.”

== Development goals and strategies ==
Progressio seeks to promote “People Powered Development” in the areas they conduct their operations. The ultimate goal of the organisation is to improve the lives of the world’s poor by supporting skill and education programs that provide them with the “resilience and resourcefulness to be the authors of their own development.” Three areas that Progressio has outlined as key factors for this process for 2010-2015 are: Participation and effective governance, sustainable environment, and HIV/AIDS education and research. Progressio employs “development workers” that serve local communities providing expertise, knowledge, and support to the poor and marginalised. These development workers are professionally qualified, with training in their field. Progressio Ireland also engages in advocacy and campaigning to change existing political and social structures in developed and underdeveloped regions.

== Current projects ==
Progressio Ireland currently has operations in Ireland as well as 10 countries in various regions of the world:

- Latin America Operations: El Salvador, Honduras, Nicaragua and Peru
- Africa Operations: Malawi, Somaliland and Zimbabwe
- Caribbean Operations: Dominican Republic/Haiti
- Middle East Operations: Yemen
- Southeast Asia Operations: Timor-Leste

=== Ireland ===
Progressio’s work in Ireland is primarily focused on developing campaigning and advocacy work rooted in the work of Progressio in the 10 countries they support internationally. Progressio is currently working on a LiveSimply campaign that promotes environmentally and socially responsible lifestyles, as well as the Act Now on 2015 campaign in conjunction with Dóchas to increase Ireland's foreign aid budget. Procurement of illegally logged timber in Ireland and the UK is also currently a focus of Progressio. In 2008, Progressio Ireland began to apply pressure to the Irish government to introduce ethical considerations into National Pension Reserve Fund guidelines after discovering the organisation had invested nearly €578 million in Zimbabwe-linked companies, indirectly funding Robert Mugabe’s regime.

=== Latin America ===
In Latin America, much of Progressio’s concentration is on the issues of resource management, specifically water distribution and illegal logging, which Progressio has likened to the illegal drug trade in terms of how it is conducted and the damage it causes.

=== Africa ===
In Africa, Progressio Ireland’s work is diverse, ranging from food distribution efforts in Malawi to human rights abuses in Zimbabwe. The organisation focuses on improving illiteracy rates, especially among women, improving farming practices, broadening access to energy systems, applying pressure to governments accused of human rights abuses, as well as other relief efforts.

=== Caribbean ===
Progressio Ireland’s work in the Caribbean focused on Hispaniola, and supports a bi-national approach to work in Haiti and the Dominican Republic. They seek to promote good governance in the region as well as ensuring that Haitians’ rights are respected on the Haiti/Dominican Republic border. Currently Progressio is focused on building up the strength of the work within Haiti, while maintaining the bi-national approach.

=== Middle East ===
In the Middle East, the current focus of the organisation is dealing with Yemen. Specifically Progressio Ireland deals with HIV/AIDS awareness and documentation in the face of government obstruction, as well as increasing the role of women in society and protecting their rights.

=== Southeast Asia ===
Progressio's presence in Southeast Asia is concentrated in Timor-Leste. Progressio Ireland works to maintain the peace process in this region following the Indonesian occupation of East Timor of 1975–1999. Their goal is to facilitate the establishment of a strong civil society capable of holding local and national governments to account.
