= Gerrit van Santen =

Dutch painter

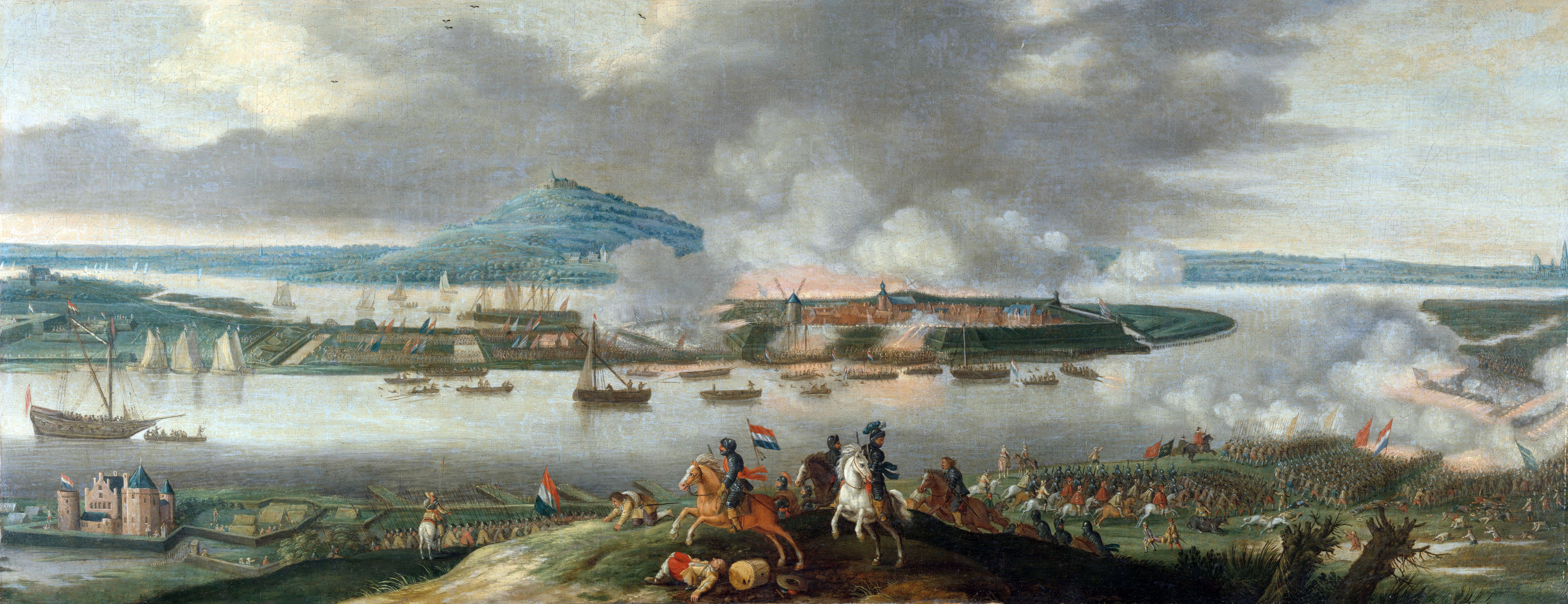
- The Siege of Schenkenschans by Gerrit van Santen
- Born: Gerard Cornelisz. van Santen; 1591/92; Delft, County of Holland, Dutch Republic
- Died: 1656 (aged 64–65); Delft, County of Holland, Dutch Republic
- Known for: Paintings of sieges

Gerrit van Santen or Gerard Cornelisz van Santen (1591/92–1656) was a Dutch Golden Age painter and writer. He was born in Delft probably in 1591 or 1592, and was buried in the city on 26 April 1656.

== Career ==
=== Author ===
Van Santen's farce Lichte Wigger was printed in Leiden in 1617. It was performed by the Amsterdam Chamber of Rhetoric in 1635, and reprinted the same year. It was followed by a series of other comedic pieces in the 1620s, including a volume of epigrams printed under the titleTijd-Verdrijfjes ("Little Pastimes").

=== Painter ===
In 1629 Van Santen was admitted to the Guild of St Luke in The Hague. Between 1637 and 1650 several payments were made by Frederick Henry, Prince of Orange for paintings of battles and sieges (including the siege of Hulst, siege of Sas van Gent, and siege of Schenkenschans).

== Works ==
=== Author ===
- Lichte Wigger, 1617
- Snappende Sytgen, 1620
- Van t'een op t'aer, 1624
- Keurelycke Neeltge, 1625
- Stomme-boden ofte brieven, 1625
- Graefs wandelpraetje, 1626
- Tijd-verdrijfjes, 1626
- Gierigheids misprijsing ende weldoens lof en loon, 1629

=== Painter ===
- Cavalry Battle, 1635, auctioned in Stockholm 1996
- Cavalry Battle, 1640, auctioned in London 1981
- Siege of Schenkenschans, ca.1645, Rijksmuseum, Amsterdam
- Battle of Lekkerbeetje, ca. 1650, Gouda city hall
