= Ad Geelhoed =

Dutch professor, civil service worker and Advocate-General

Prof., LL.M. Ad Geelhoed

Advocate-General of the European Court of Justice
- In office 7 October 2000 – 6 October 2006

Personal details
- Born: 12 November 1942 Vught, Netherlands
- Died: 20 April 2007 (aged 64) Arnhem, Netherlands

Leendert Adrie "Ad" Geelhoed (12 November 1942 – 20 April 2007) was a Dutch professor, civil service worker, and Advocate-General of the European Court of Justice.

== Biography ==
Geelhoed was born in 1942 in Vught, he finished his study of Dutch law at Utrecht University in 1970. He stayed on at the university for one year to work as a scientific employee for the Europe Institute. Geelhoed then moved to Luxembourg to work as an assistant for the Dutch judge André Donner at the European Court of Justice. In 1974 he returned to the Netherlands and became an advisor to the Ministry of Justice. In 1983 he took his role as advisor to a higher level when he became member of the Scientific Council for Government Policy. He worked for this institution until 1990. From 1985 to 1989 he also worked as a professor of European and economic law at the Erasmus University Rotterdam. In 1990 he became the Secretary-General, the highest civil servant, of the Ministry of Economic Affairs, in 1997 he transferred to the Ministry of General Affairs. During his time as Secretary-General in the early 1990s he stated that the Netherlands could fire up to a quarter of its civil servants.

In October 2000 he gave this position up to become Advocate-General (AG) of the European Court of Justice. During his time as AG he produced an above average number of 240 opinions. Many of which were seen as remarkable or innovating by the press. In one opinion he proposed cutting the pension of a European Commissioner in half for nepotism. In another opinion he proposed scrapping a Directive a it was qualitatively bad. His term ended in October 2006. He then returned to his part-time professorship of European Integration at Utrecht University, which he had since 1998. On 20 April 2007 he died. At the time of his death he was member of the board of the Independent Post and Telecommunications Authority.

On 29 April 1994 he was made Knight in the Order of the Netherlands Lion. He was a member of the Labour Party and a close aid to Prime Minister Wim Kok.
