= Jan-Hein Arens =

Dutch painter, sculptor and illustrator (born 1974)

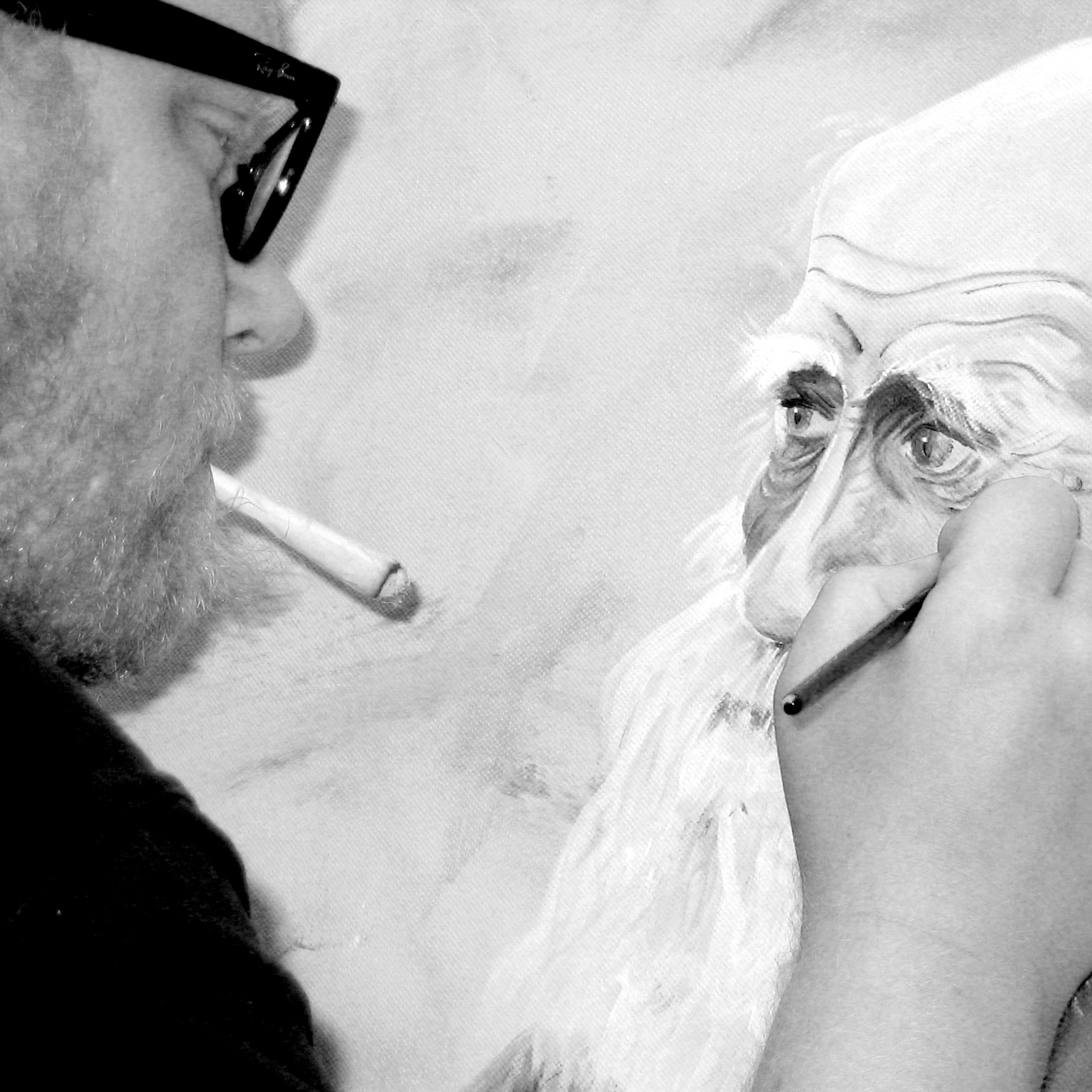
- Born: September 23, 1974; Vught, the Netherlands
- Education: Graphic Design
- Known for: Painting, sculpting, illustration

Jan-Hein Arens (Vught, the Netherlands, born September 23, 1974) is a Dutch painter, sculptor and illustrator. He attended the Grafische School Eindhoven from 1992–1996, where he was educated in Graphic Design and illustration. Arens is heavily influenced by COBRA (a European art movement active around 1950), Pop Art and the drawings of his seven-year-old daughter.

The work of Arens concentrates on basic human needs and emotions, and by adding different, often strange elements, or placing them out of context the spectator is forced to make up his/her own reason or meaning for the work. Humor and alienation are also common elements in Arens’ work.

== Technique ==
Arens' paintings and cast concrete sculptures are usually built up from layers. Often realistic drawings of body parts, such as eyes or mouths, are superimposed onto a base layer of geometric figures. The work is then augmented with thick black lines, text, and paint thrown directly onto the canvas.

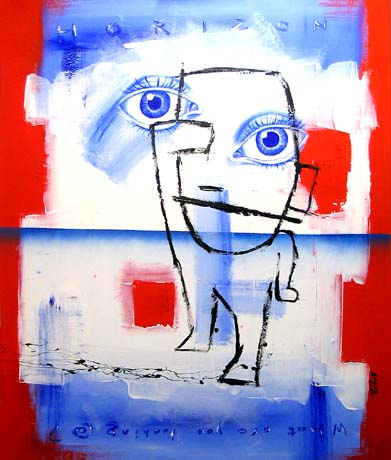

Arens' work is notable for combining realistic casual elements with action painting and thick black, drawing like lines. In this way, Pop Art and COBRA are mixed together to create a hierarchy of importance. Elements that are not important at all can even be replaced by plain text.

In the Netherlands, Arens is referred to as an artist who still works in the spirit of COBRA. Arens had shows in galleries in the Netherlands, Canada and France.
