= Bas de Bever =

Dutch racing cyclist

Personal information
- Full name: Bas de Bever
- Born: 16 April 1968 (age 58) Vught, the Netherlands

Cycling career
- Sport: Cycling
- Current team: Retired/National team coach
- Disciplines: Bicycle motocross (BMX); Mountain bike racing (MTB)
- Role: Racer
- Rider type: BMX: Off-road; MTB: Downhill, four-cross

Amateur teams
- 1982: Vector Bars USA
- 1983-1984: GT Racing Europe
- 1986: Mongoose/Sinisalo
- 1987-1988: AMEV

Professional teams
- 1989: Sunn
- 1989: Premier
- 1989-1991: MCS Europe
- 1991-1995: WEBCO
- 1995-1997: Batavus
- 1998-2004: Be One

Bas de Bever (born 16 April 1968) is a Dutch former professional "Mid/Current School" Bicycle Motocross (BMX) racer whose prime competitive years were 1985–1993.

== Racing career ==
Note: Professional first are on the national level unless otherwise indicated.

Started Racing: 1981

Sanctioning Body:

First race result:

First win (local):

First sponsor:

First national win:

First American Professional race result: First place in Pro/Super Open Wheels (formerly Pro Cruiser) at the NBL Christmas Classic in Columbus Ohio on 28 December 1992.

First American Professional win: See above

First American Junior Pro*/Superclass race result: Second place in Superclass at the NBL Christmas Classic in Columbus, Ohio on 28 December 1989. He won US$355.25.

First American Junior Pro*/Superclass win: In Superclass at the NBL Christmas Classic in Columbus, Ohio in December 1990 (Day 1) He also came in second place in Pro Award. On Day 2 he came in last place in Superclass.

First American Senior Pro/Elite Men** race result: Fourth in All Pros at the NBL Christmas Classic in Columbus Ohio on 28 December 1992.

First American Senior Pro/Elite Men win: See "First American Professional race result"

Retired: 1995 to race Mountain Bikes (MTB). He actually didn't quit because he thought it was time to move on and try something els after winning all there was to win in BMX. Instead he quit because of the people's attitudes around him. As he stated in an interview concucted by former fellow BMX racer Dale Holmes:

Holmes: "Why did you quit BMX and get into Mountainbikes?"
de Bever: At the time I was totally over the whole euro BMX scene, not the actual racing or riding the bike, cause I still loved that, but more the wining(sic) parents bossing their kids around. ---Daleholmes.com 2002

Height & weight at height of his career (1987–1992): Ht:" Wt:lbs.

*In the American NBL it is B"/Superclass/"A" pro (beginning with 2000 season), in Europe Superclass; in the American ABA it is "A" pro.
**In the NBL it is "A" pro/All Pro/"AA" Pro/Elite men (all depending on the era); in Europe Elite Men; in the ABA it is "AA" pro.

=== Career factory and major bike shop sponsors ===
Note: This listing only denotes the racer's primary sponsors. At any given time a racer could have numerous ever changing co-sponsors. Primary sponsorships can be verified by BMX press coverage and sponsor's advertisements at the time in question. When possible exact dates are given.

==== Amateur ====
- Vector Bars USA (European Division): 1982
- GT (Gary Turner) Racing (European Division): 1983-1984
- Mongoose/Sinisalo: February 1986-December 1986
- AMEV Nederland b.v.: January 1987 – 1988 AMEV at the time de Bever was sponsored by them was a life insurance and banking firm. AMEV in Dutch stands for Algemeene Maatschappij tot Exploitatie van Verzekeringsmaatschappijen which in English literally translates to General Society To Develop Insurance Companies.

==== Professional ====
- Sunn: 1989
- Priemer: 1989
- MCS (Moto Cross Specialties) Bicycle Specialties (European Division): 1989-1991
- WEBCO Bicycles: 1991-1995. This is not the famous American pioneering Webco Inc. of the early to late 1970s. This Webco is the West European Bicycle Company created in 1991 by Gerrit Does, the person who introduced BMX to Europe (the Netherlands specifically) and co-founded the IBMXF.

=== Career bicycle motocross titles ===
Note: Listed are District, State/Provincial/Department, Regional, National, and International titles in italics. "Defunct" refers to the fact of that sanctioning body in question no longer existing at the start of the racer's career or at that stage of his/her career. Depending on point totals of individual racers, winners of Grand Nationals do not necessarily win National titles. Series and one off Championships are also listed in block.

==== Amateur ====
Koninklijke Nederlandsche Wielren Unie (KNWU)

Nederlandse Fietscross Federatie (NFF)

National Bicycle Association (NBA)

- None

National Bicycle League (NBL)

- None

American Bicycle Association (ABA)

- None

United States Bicycle Motocross Association (USBA)

- None

International Bicycle Motocross Federation (IBMXF)*

- 1983 14 Junior World Champion'
- 1985 17 & Over Boys Second Place World Champion
- 1987 18-24 Cruiser World Champion

Fédération Internationale Amateur de Cyclisme (FIAC)*

- None

Union Cycliste Internationale (UCI)*

*See note in Professional section.

==== Professional ====
Koninklijke Nederlandsche Wielren Unie (KNWU)

Nederlandse Fietscross Federatie (NFF)

National Bicycle Association (NBA)

- None (defunct)

National Bicycle League (NBL)

- None

American Bicycle Association (ABA)

- None

United States Bicycle Motocross Association (USBA)

- None (defunct)

International Bicycle Motocross Federation (IBMXF)*

- 1988 20" Superclass 4th International Indoor de Tours Champion
- 1989 24" Superclass European Challenge Cup VI
- 1989 Ponypark Competition of Masters Winner
- 1989 Second place Superclass and Super Cruiser World Champion
- 1990 20" Superclass 6th International Indoor de Tours Winner
- 1990 20" Superclass European Champion
- 1990 24" Superclass World Champion
- 1991 20" Pro/Am Supercross of BMX Champion
- 1991 20" Superclass Silver Medal World Champion
- 1991 24" Superclass World Champion
- 1992 24" Superclass International Indoor Leeuwarden Winner
- 1992 20" Superclass Indoor de Dijon Winner
- 1992 24" Superclass 1st Indoor de Tours Winner
- 1992 24" Superclass European Champion
- 1992 24" Superclass World Champion
- 1994 24" European Champion

Fédération Internationale Amateur de Cyclisme (FIAC)*

Union Cycliste Internationale (UCI)*

*Note: Beginning in 1991 the IBMXF and FIAC, the amateur cycling arm of the UCI, had been holding joint World Championship events as a transitional phase in merging which began in earnest in 1993. Beginning with the 1996 season the IBMXF and FIAC completed the merger and both ceased to exist as independent entities being integrated into the UCI. Beginning with the 1996 World Championships held in Brighton, England the UCI would officially hold and sanction BMX World Championships and with it inherited all precedents, records, streaks, etc. from both the IBMXF and FIAC.

Independent Invitationals and Pro Series Championships

=== Notable accolades ===
- On 8 January 1988 he was one of three racers awarded the "Sport Support Award" by the Dutch National Olympic Committee for their having the best finishes during 1987.

=== Racing habits and traits ===
- While he raced a couple of times on the American circuit as a professional (including two ABA Grandnationals), he never attempted to race a complete season. He was content on what he was doing at the time.

== BMX press magazine interviews and articles ==
- "Special World Edition World Cup 1994: Holland" American BMXer September 1994 Vol.16 No.8 pg.49

== BMX magazine covers ==
Bicycle Motocross News:

- None (defunct)

Minicycle/BMX Action & Super BMX:

- None

Bicycle Motocross Action & Go:

- None

BMX Plus!:

- None

Total BMX:

Bicycles and Dirt:

- None

Snap BMX Magazine & Transworld BMX:

Bicycles Today & BMX Today (The Official NBL publication under two names):

ABA Action, American BMXer, BMXer (The Official ABA publication under three names):

== Post BMX career ==
- In 1994, during his last couple of years of BMX competition, he became a Downhill mountainbiker.
- In November 2005 he was hired by Koninklijke Nederlandsche Wielren Unie (KNWU) to be the National Team Coach and Trainer for the Dutch BMX and MTB (Four-cross and Downhill) racing teams and to train them for the upcoming 2008 Olympic Games in Beijing, China.

== Career Mountain Bike (MTB) Racing Record ==
Started racing: 1994 on local level in Netherlands and Belgium and Germany.

Sub Discipline: Downhill, 4X cross

First race result: In 8th place in local Belgium race.

Sanctioning body:

Retired: 2004. Currently Coach of the Dutch BMX and MTB National teams.

=== Career MTB factory and major Non-factory sponsors ===
Note: This listing only denotes the racer's primary sponsors. At any given time a racer could have numerous co-sponsors. Primary sponsorships can be verified by MTB press coverage and sponsor's advertisements at the time in question. When possible exact dates are given.

==== Professional ====
- VSB-Batavus Cycles: 1995-1997
- Be One Bicycle Company: 1998-2004. Be-One Bikes is a susiduary of Batavus Cycles.

=== Career Mountain Bike Racing (MTB) titles ===
Note: Listed are Regional, National and International titles.

==== Amateur ====
No amateur status.

==== Professional ====
Union Cycliste Internationale (UCI)

- 1995 World Cup Champion
- 2003 World Cup Champion

National Off Road Bicycle Association (NORBA)

USA Cycling

Independent Race Series and Invitationals

- 2003 Men's Jeep King of Mountain Series Individual Champion

=== Significant MTB injuries ===
- Broke collarbone in a collision with a tree during a Downhill event in Japan in 2001. Out for six weeks.
