= Edy Korthals Altes =

Dutch diplomat (1924–2021)

Edy J. Korthals Altes, (5 March 1924 – 25 December 2021) was a Dutch diplomat who, in 1986, resigned from his ambassador post in Madrid in connection with his public stand on the arms race. Altes was born in Vught, Netherlands on 5 March 1924. He studied economics at Erasmus University Rotterdam, and married Deetje Meijer in 1950. Altes died on 25 December 2021, at the age of 97.

== Career in Foreign Service ==
- Served in New York; Colombo; Paris (Economic Committee of the Organisation for European Economic Co-operation)
- The Hague; Bonn (1962–1967) CounsellorPress/Cultural Affairs
- Rome (1967–1970) Counsellor Economic Affairs
- Djakarta (1970–1972) Minister Plenipotentiary-Deputy Head of Mission
- Brussels (1973–1977) Deputy Permanent Representative European Communities
- Warsaw (1977–1980) Ambassador; The Hague (1980–1982) Head of Foreign Service
- Madrid (1983–1986) Ambassador

== Memberships ==
After 1986, Edy Korthals Altes was an outspoken proponent of global peace and security, inter-religious cooperation, and spiritual renewal as vice chairman of the Dutch chapter of the Pugwash Movement (1987–1995), chairman of the Section International Affairs of the Netherlands Council of Churches (1990–1996), co-president of the European Ecumenical Commission on Development (1991–1993), Member EKD Advisory Commission for Development Affairs (1992–1997, Germany) and president of the World Conference of Religions for Peace (1994–1999, honorary president (1999–2004). He was latterly a fellow of the World Academy of Art and Science.

== Bibliography ==
- Edy Korthals Altes (1988). Mens of Marionet Balans, Amsterdam.
- Edy Korthals Altes (1988). Een dure keizer zonder kleren Kok, Kampen.
- Edy Korthals Altes (1999). Heart and Soul for Europe Van Gorcum, Assen.
- Edy Korthals Altes (2002). Europa Ontwaak! Damon, Budel 2001 (Second edition 2002).
- Edy Korthals Altes (2002). Spiritualiteit Valkhofpers, Nijmegen.
- Edy Korthals Altes (2006). Cuore e Anima per l'Europa, Un cammino verso il Rinnovamento Spirituale. Franco Angeli, Milano.
- Edy Korthals Altes (2008). Spiritual Awakening. The Hidden Key to Peace and Security, Just and Sustainable Economics, A Responsible European Union. Peeters, Leuven - Paris - Dudley, MA.

== Contributions to third party publications ==
- A Diplomatic Conversion: From MAD to Mutual Assured Security, in: ‘The Nuclear Mentality’, Pluto Press, 1989.
- Progress and Failure in Arms control, in: New Technologies and Arms Race, Macmillan ‘89.
- East-West economic cooperation: Problems and Perspectives (Russisch), in: International Relations Magazine (No.11, 1989) Moskou.
- Die Zivilisierung des Konflikts, Eine Skizze, Loccumer Protokolle 4, 1989.
- Integration or continued Marginalization? in: ‘Towards a Secure World in the 21st Century’, Annals of Pugwash 1990, Taylor and Francis.
- The Arms race, Development and the Environment in Peacetime; Proceedings Seminar in Perm November 1991, Peace Research Institute Oslo.
- Religions and Politics in Europe- a coalition for survival?, Interreligiöse Erziehung 2000, Die Zukunft der Religions- und Kulturbegegnung, Nürnberger Forum 1997. E.B.Verlag, Hamburg.
- Evangelium und Kultur, Zie: ‘Ökonomie und Spiritualität, Verantwortliches Wirtschaften im Spiegel der Religionen’, E.B. Verlag, Hamburg.
- The Gospel challenging the Domination of Economics in Modern Society in: ‘A soul for Europe, Ethics and Spirituality in the Process of European Integration’,1998, Ecumenical Association of Academies and Laity Centres in Europe.
- Religies van confrontatie naar coöperatie, in ‘Opties voor de toekomst’, Kok, Agora 1998.
- Op weg naar een duurzame en rechtvaardige economie, in: ‘Integrity of Earth and Life’, Oproep tot consuminderen en respect voor de schepping, Uitgave LMC 2002.
- Spiritual Values in European cultural life. in ‘Socially engaged spirituality’, Essays in Honor of Sulak Sivaraksa on his 70th birthday. Sathirakoses-Nagapra-dipa Foundation, Bangkok 2003.
- Europa's rol in een onveilige wereld, Zie: ‘Europa- Balans en Richting’ Lannoo Campus 2003.
- The Contribution of the European Union to Peace and Security in an Unbalanced World, in The United States and Europe: partners or rivals?, Conference Report November 2004, The Hague
- The Relevance of the Spiritual Factorfor a New Approach to Peace and Security, in Conference proceedings TU-Eindhoven on Science, Technology and Peace, 2006
- The Contribution of Religions to a Just and Sustainable Economic Development, in the Pari Dialogues, Volume 1, 2007
- Today's Response to ‘War Contrary to the Will of God’, in The Ecumenical Movement at Crossroads, 2008
- A New Spirit for Europe, in Imagine Europe, Uitg. Garant, Antwerpen, 2009
- Impressions of crucial years: Poland, 1970–1980, in Poland and the Netherlands: a case study of European relations, Republic of Letters, 2011
- Van mateloos naar menselijke maat, in Pamflet2.nl Leidende Idealen, uitg. Van Gorcum, 2012.
- Een Europese bijdrage aan een duurzame wereld, in ‘Europa en de wereld’ - uit. Europese Beweging Nederland, 2014
