= Henry Neville =

Henry Neville or Nevile may refer to:

== Peers and politicians ==
- Henry Neville, 5th Earl of Westmorland (1525–1564), English peer
- Henry Neville, 7th Baron Braybrooke (1855–1941), Baron Braybrooke
- Henry Neville (died 1615) (1564–1615), English ambassador and politician
- Henry Neville (died c.1415), MP for Leicestershire
- Henry Neville (Gentleman of the Privy Chamber) (c. 1520–1593)
- Henry Nevile (Lord Lieutenant of Lincolnshire) (1920–1996), English farmer, local politician and local administrator
- Henry Grey (MP) (1683–1740), formerly Neville, English MP

== Other ==
- Henry Neville (actor) (1837–1910), British actor and theatre manager
- Henry Neville (cricketer) (1824–1854), English cricketer and British Army officer
- Henry Neville (writer) (1620–1694), English author and satirist
- Henry Neville (priest) (1822–1889), Irish priest and educator

== See also ==
- Henry Nevill (disambiguation)
- Henry Gladstone, 1st Baron Gladstone of Hawarden (1852–1935), British businessman and politician
