= Cornelis Droochsloot =

Dutch Golden Age painter

Cornelis Droochsloot (c. 1640 in Utrecht – after 1673 in Utrecht) was a Dutch Golden Age painter.

According to the RKD he was the son and pupil of Joost Cornelisz Droochsloot and is known for genre works, landscapes and farm scenes.

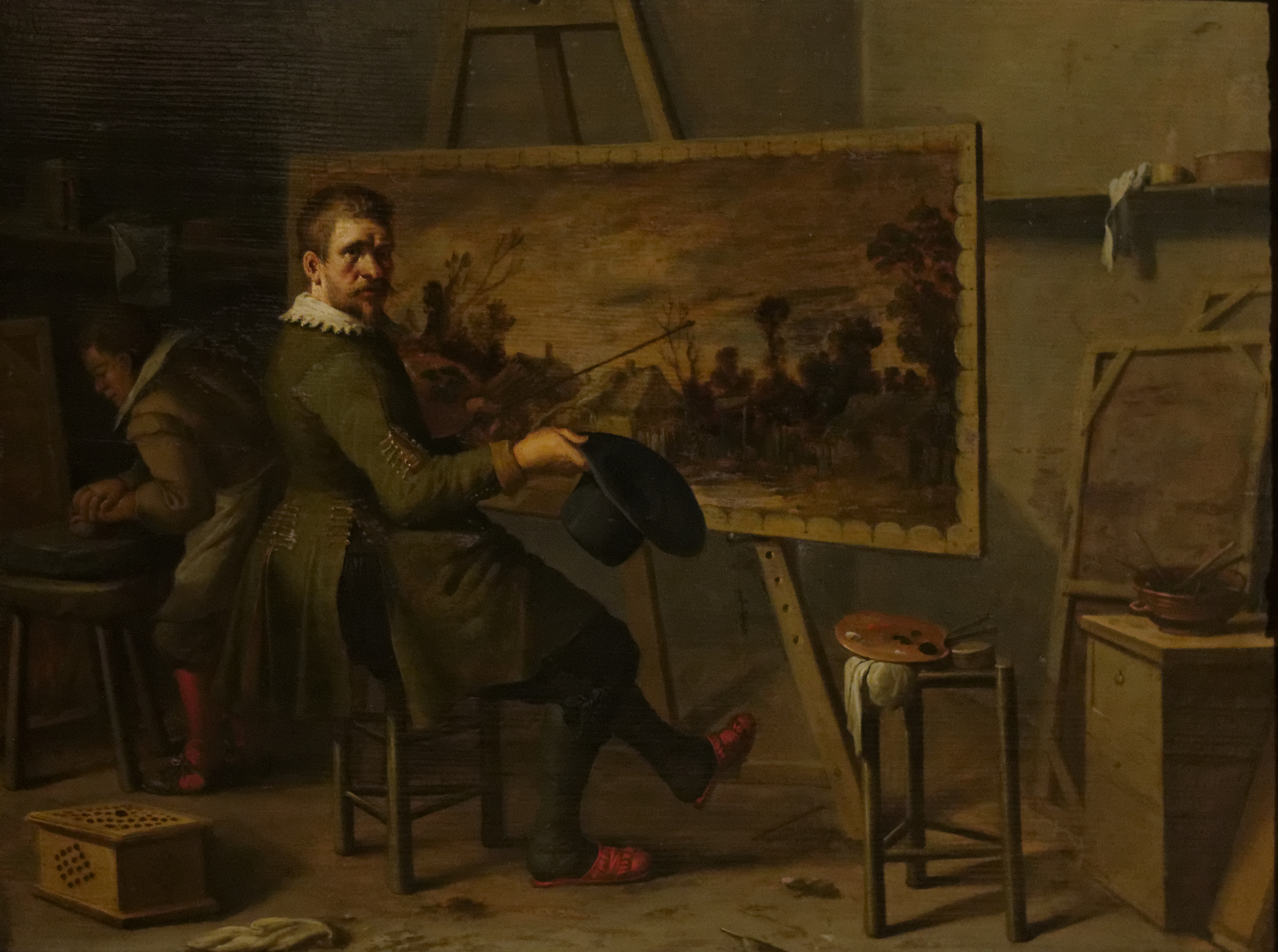
Self-portrait of Cornelis Droochsloot
