= Neville Ashenheim =

Jamaican diplomat and businessman

Sir Neville Noel Ashenheim (18 December 1900 – 1 September 1984) was a Jamaican businessman, lawyer, politician, and served as the first Jamaican Ambassador to the United States. He received a knighthood from Queen Elizabeth II on 1 January 1963. Ashenheim served his post as ambassador until March 1967 He was the great-grandson of Lewis Ashenheim, who coedited The First Fruits of the West, the first Jewish periodical in the West Indies. Neville himself was a Jew.
