= Naville =

Naville is a French surname. People with the name include:

- Denise Naville (1896–1979), French writer and translator
- Édouard Naville (1844–1926), Swiss archaeologist, Egyptologist and Biblical scholar
- François Naville (1883–1968), Swiss physician
- Marguerite Naville (1852–1930), Swiss artist, photographer and writer
- Pierre Naville (1903–1993), French Surrealist writer and sociologist

== See also ==
- Navile, a canal in Emilia-Romagna, northern Italy
- Neville (name)
