= Bridget Cracroft-Eley =

British secretary, farmer and magistrate

Bridget Katharine Cracroft-Eley CVO JP (29 October 1933 – 29 August 2008) was a British secretary, farmer and magistrate.

Born in Lincolnshire, she was the daughter of Lieutenant-Colonel Sir Weston Cracroft-Amcotts and his wife Rhona Clifton-Brown, daughter of Edward Clifton-Brown. In 1995, she received an honorary doctorate from De Montfort University and in 2003 from the University of Lincoln.

Cracroft-Eley was appointed High Sheriff of Lincolnshire for 1989 and served as justice of the peace of that county. She was appointed the first female Lord Lieutenant of Lincolnshire in 1995, an office she held until her death. In 1997, she became High Steward of Lincoln Cathedral.

On 31 October 1959, she married Robert Peel Charles Eley (1931-1996), son of Charles Ryves Maxwell Eley. They had two children, one son and one daughter. Cracroft-Eley became a Commander of the Royal Victorian Order (CVO) in the 2008 New Year Honours. She died in August of that year at her home in Hackthorn, aged 74, of a brain tumour.

Honorary titles
| Preceded by Sir Henry Nevile | Lord Lieutenant of Lincolnshire; 1995–2008 | Succeeded by Anthony Worth |
