= Joost Cornelisz Droochsloot =

Dutch painter

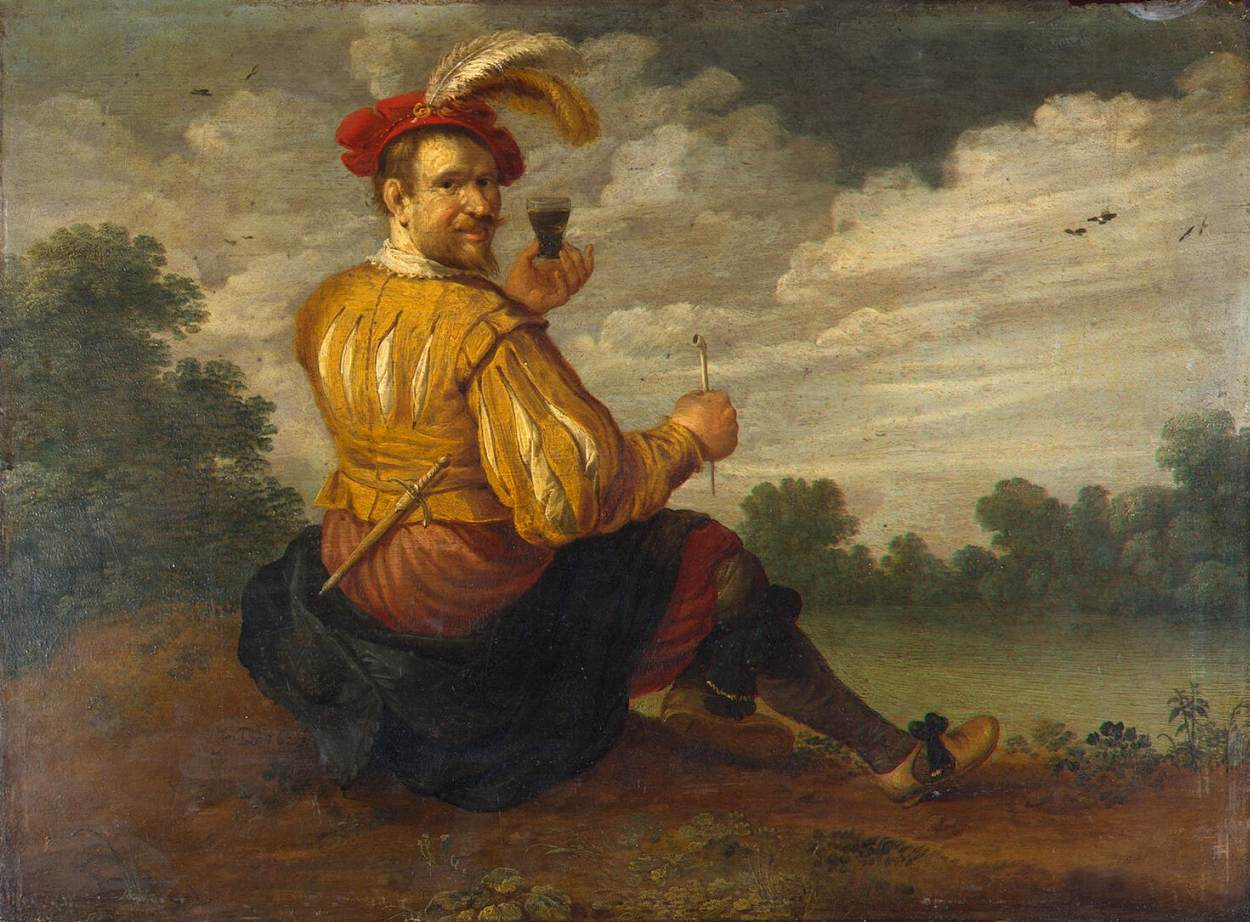
Selfportrait, 1627

Joost Cornelisz Droochsloot or Droogsloot (1586 – May 14, 1666), was a Dutch painter of village scenes, landscapes, genre pictures, moral allegories and biblical stories.

== Biography ==
Droochsloot was born and died in Utrecht. He became a member of the Utrecht Guild of Saint Luke in 1616. He later became deacon of the guild in 1623 and regent of the St. Jobs Gasthuis in 1638, deacon of the Dutch Reformed church, and in 1665 officer of the Utrecht schutterij.

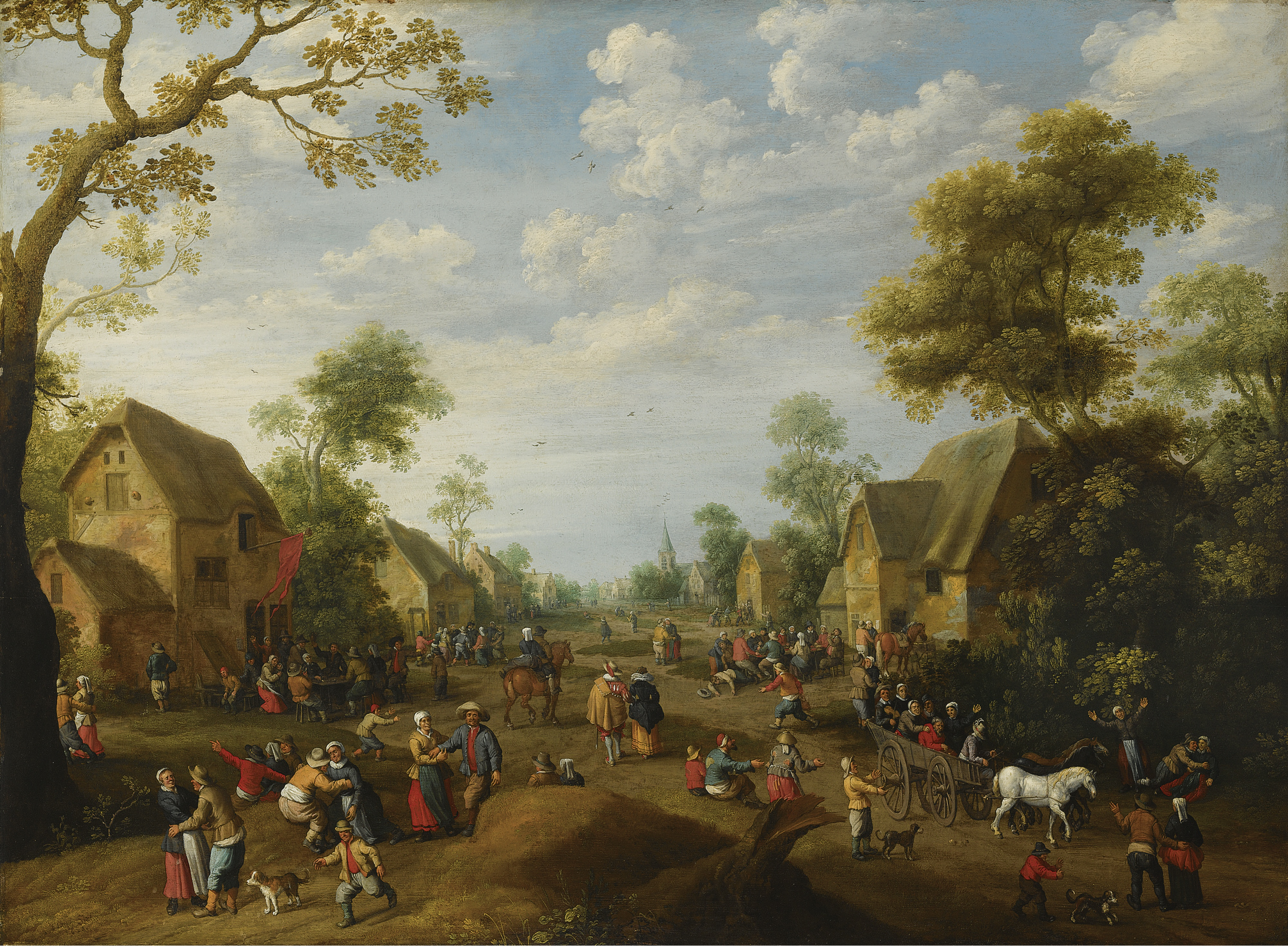
A village kermesse with numerous peasants feasting, 1628

He was the father and teacher of the painter Cornelis Droochsloot (1630–1673) whose paintings are hard to distinguish from his own, and the teacher of Jacob Duck.

== Work ==
Joost Cornelisz Droochsloot was a versatile painter who was known for his village scenes, landscapes, genre pictures, moral allegories and biblical stories. His early works reflects the influence of Pieter Brueghel the Elder, Pieter Brueghel the Younger, David Vinckboons and Esaias van de Velde. He stood in the tradition of Flemish landscape painting, particular of the village scenes as developed by Pieter Brueghel the Elder. His village scenes usually depict a broad village street leading into the distance and houses on both sides. The villages are populated with crowds of coarse peasant figures, dispersed somewhat at random. These figures are individualised and depicted in expressive poses. Droochsloot paid a lot of attention to the details in his compositions. His village scenes often carried a moral message. He had a preference for a reddish-brown palette.

The early Dutch artist biographer Arnold Houbraken recounts that Droochsloot's scenes of village kermisses (Boerekermisstuk) were as popular as flower pieces by Bartholomeus Assteyn.

He used the monogram "JCODS".
