= Nevills =

Nevills may refer to:

- Norman Nevills (1908-1949), American river-runner
- Sam Nevills (c. 1925 - after 1953), Canadian football player

== See also ==
- Nevil (disambiguation)
- Nevill (disambiguation)
- Neville (disambiguation)
