= Henry Nevill =

Henry Nevill may refer to:

- Henry Nevill, 2nd Earl of Abergavenny (1755–1843), British nobleman
- Henry Nevill, 3rd Marquess of Abergavenny (1854–1938), British nobleman
- Henry Nevill, 6th Baron Bergavenny (died 1587), English nobleman
- Henry Nevill, 9th Baron Bergavenny (1580-1641), English nobleman
- Henry Nevill (priest) (1821–1900), Archdeacon of Norfolk

== See also ==
- Henry Neville (disambiguation)
