= Lewis Ashenheim =

Scottish physician and surgeon

- Born: c. 1817; Edinburgh
- Died: 26 November 1858 (aged 40–41); Jamaica
- Education: University of St Andrews
- Occupations: Physician, surgeon

Lewis Ashenheim (c. 1817 – 26 November 1858) was a Scottish medical doctor and surgeon.

== Biography ==
Lewis Ashenheim was born in Edinburgh to Jacob Ashenheim, a Dutch-born Jewish jeweller. He studied at the Universities of Edinburgh and St Andrews, graduating from the latter in 1839. He afterwards became a licentiate of the Royal College of Surgeons of Edinburgh. Ashenheim subsequently visited Paris, Berlin, and other European cities, acquiring professional experience. He practised for some time in London, lecturing frequently and being an active contributor to the Anglo-Jewish press.

He immigrated to Jamaica in 1843 and settled in Kingston, where he practised till 1850, when he moved to Falmouth, a port on the north coast of Jamaica. In addition to his practise, and lectures more or less connected with his profession, he addressed the public, through the press, on sanitary reform and on compulsory vaccination, of which he was an able advocate. He edited the Jewish monthly Bikkure Hayam: The First Fruits of the West and the newspaper Daily Gleaner. At Falmouth he rendered valuable services during an outbreak of cholera.

== Selected publications ==
- An exposé of the manner in which the Hebrew language is generally taught in Scotland (PDF). London: John Wertheimer & Co. 1836.
- On precipitate burial amongst the Jews: theologically, physiologically, and morally considered (PDF). Kingston, Jamaica: A. D. Y. Henriques. 1845.
