= Mildred Nevile =

Mildred Mary Nevile
- Born: 2 July 1927
- Died: 2 September 2012 (aged 85)
- Education: Leeds University
- Occupation: Organisation leader
- Known for: Catholic activist against poverty and injustice

Mildred Mary Nevile MBE (1927 – 2012) was a lifelong Catholic activist against poverty and injustice. She led what was then the Catholic Institute for International Relations to focus its work on alleviating poverty.

== Life ==
Nevile was born on 2 July 1927 at Wellingore Hall, her family's large house in Wellingore in Lincolnshire. She was the fourth of the six children of Muriel Margaret (born O'Conor) and Charles Joseph Nevile (1883–1930). Her father worked for the Sudan political service. Her elder brother was Henry Nevile who became Lord Lieutenant of Lincolnshire.

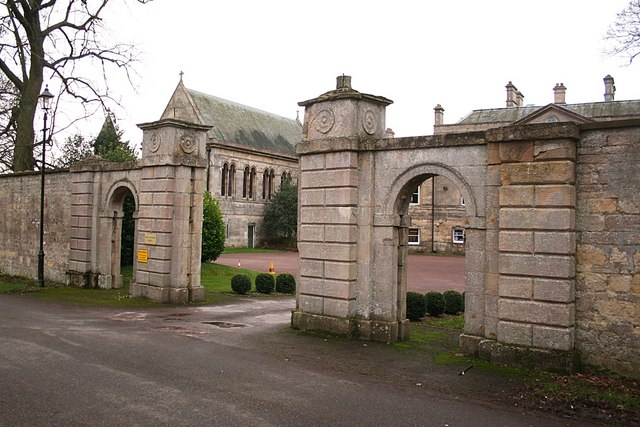
Born at Wellingore Hall. The family's chapel is visible through the gates.

She had no early higher education and in 1958 she joined the Sword of the Spirit on a part-time basis. This organisation had been created during World War Two and it had evolved into a body working with the United Nations Association and the Council for Education in World Citizenship trying to encourage students to know about global affairs.

In 1965, the Sword of the Spirit renamed itself as the Catholic Institute for International Relations (CIIR). It leased a building in Regent's Park because the landlords just wanted it occupied. In the winter they sometimes worked in overcoats because the boiler was not repaired. At the beginning of 1967 Nevile became the secretary-general of the CIIR and she proposed change. She championed the idea that they would concentrate on the development required to end poverty in the world. Former causes such as anti-racism and world peace could be left to other organisations. She believed that the institution had to show solidarity with the countries that they were working with to encourage their participation.

The organisation was active in South America in the late 1970s. South America was an early focus for the institution. They knew about the terrible condition in the tin mines in Bolivia and they were able to use this to persuade the UK government to not give the mines a grant and knowing the conditions in El Salvador they managed to prevent the sale of arms to those in power there. In Africa they were able to quietly channel funds to anti-apartheid groups including funds supplied by the Swedish government.

In the 1980 Birthday Honours, she was made a member of the Order of the British Empire (MBE). In 1985 she also decided her priorities lay elsewhere and she left the CIIR and went on to take a degree at Leeds University.

She went on to lead a group called Christian Concern for Southern Africa. This group was at one time using rooms at the CIIR offices. It had been started in 1972 and saw its role as raising awareness of affairs in South Africa and to co-ordinate a response from churches of any denomination.

Nevile had been a strong supporter of CAFOD and she was a trustee for twenty years. She is credited with advising Julian Filochowski to cut their advertising budget and to instead establish regional offices.

She died 2 September 2012.
