= Ewald Marggraff =

Dutch noble (1923–2003)

Mr. Willem Frederik Ewald Marggraff (9 June 1923, in Vught – 7 December 2003, in Vught) was a well known member of a prominent family from the Dutch gentry.

Ewald Marggraff was the son of Mr. Dr. Lodewijk Marggraff and Catharina Schran. He studied law in Utrecht and international private law in Paris.

On 7 December 2003 his house Zionsburg was destroyed by fire, while Marggraff was in the house. He was buried in the gardens of Zionsburg. In March 2006, the investigation of the accident and Marggraff's death was reopened, as there are reasons to believe the fire was not an accident, but arson.

With more than 500 estates (on a surface area of about 7 km² in total) Marggraff was probably one of the richest men of North Brabant, one of the Dutch provinces. His fortune was estimated in 1998 at 18 million euros (excluding his fortune outside the Netherlands). Marggraff's land is now owned by the Marggraff Stichting (a non-profit organization) and is open for the public (except for Zionsburg).

In November 2007, both Marggraff and Zionsburg became the main subjects of a non-fiction book, The Secret of Zionsburg (Het geheim van Zionsburg). In it the authors, Joris van Os and Jurriaan Maessen, speculate liberally on the backgrounds of the estate and its potential role in Dutch history. One of the more notable connections offered in the book is the one between Zionsburg and medieval Grail lore. The presence of Teutonic Knights on the estate leads the authors to the hypothesis of Zionsburg being a potential resting place for a Crusader treasure, possibly the Holy Grail.
