= Mary Nevill =

Mary Nevill may refer to:

- Mary Nevill, Baroness Dacre (1524–1576), daughter of George Nevill, 5th Baron Bergavenny and his third wife, Mary; wife of Thomas Fiennes, 9th Baron Dacre
- Mary Neville, Baroness le Despencer (died 1626), daughter of Henry Nevill, 6th Baron Bergavenny and Lady Frances Manners; wife of Thomas Fane
- Mary Nevill (field hockey) (born 1961)
