= Nevil =

Nevil may refer to:

Surname:

- Alex Nevil (born 1965), American actor and younger brother of Robbie Nevil
- Dwight Nevil (born 1944), American professional golfer
- Robbie Nevil (born 1958), American pop singer-songwriter/producer/guitarist

Given name:

- Nevil Brownjohn GBE KCB CMG MC (1897–1973), Quartermaster-General to the Forces
- Nevil Dede (born 1975), Tirana's current coach and a former football defender
- Nevil Macready, GCMG, KCB, PC (Ire) (1862–1946), British Army officer
- John Nevil Maskelyne (1839–1917), English stage magician and inventor of the pay toilet
- Nevil Maskelyne FRS (1732–1811), the fifth English Astronomer Royal
- Nevil Maskelyne (magician) (1863–1924), British magician and inventor
- Nevil Story Maskelyne (1823–1911), English geologist and politician
- Henry Nevil Payne (died 1710), dramatist and agitator for the Roman Catholic cause in Scotland and England
- Nevil Shed, American basketball player
- Nevil Shute (1899–1960), British novelist and aeronautical engineer
- Nevil Sidgwick (1873–1952), English theoretical chemist who contributed to the theory of valency and chemical bonding

== See also ==
- Nevill (disambiguation)
- Neville (disambiguation)
- Nevills (disambiguation)
