= Henry Nevile (Lord Lieutenant of Lincolnshire) =

English farmer, local politician and local administrator

Sir Henry Nicholas Nevile, KCVO, KStJ, JP, DL (13 March 1920 – 20 October 1996) was an English farmer, local politician and local administrator, who served as Lord Lieutenant of Lincolnshire for twenty years.

== Life ==
Henry Nicholas Nevile was born on 13 March 1920, the elder son of Charles Joseph Nevile (1883–1930), of Wellingore in Lincolnshire, and his wife Muriel Margaret, daughter of the diplomat Sir Nicholas Roderick O'Conor, GCB, GCMG. His sister was the activist Mildred Mary Nevile. The elder Nevile was the third son of Ralph Henry Christopher Nevile, JP (1850–1911), who had been High Sheriff of Lincolnshire in 1883; the elder two sons both died childless—Geoffrey Henry Nevile, JP, in 1935, and Lt Hugh George Nevile in 1915 while fighting in World War I. As a result, Henry Nevile became heir to the estates in Wellingore and Auborn which his family had possessed since the 17th century. In 1944, he married Jean Rosita Mary, MBE, daughter of Cyril James Winceslas Torr; they had two sons and three daughters: Sarah Rosita Mary (born 1945), Elizabeth Jane Mary (born 1947), Jill Gabriel Anne Mary (born 1950), Christopher James (born 1954), and Hugh Simon (born 1960).

Following schooling at Ampleforth College, Nevile attended Trinity College, Cambridge. He served with the Scots Guards in Europe during World War II. His entry into public service came in 1950, when he was appointed a Justice of the Peace; two years later he became a member of the Upper Witham Internal Drainage Board and he joined the Lincolnshire River Board and Authority in 1962, the same year he became a Deputy Lieutenant. In 1963, Nevile was appointed High Sheriff of Lincolnshire and the following year he became a County councillor for Kesteven, serving until 1972. Also in 1964, Nevile became Chairman of the Upper Witham IDB; he remained in that role until 1976 and was a member until 1983, a year after he left the Lincolnshire River Board. Between 1975 and 1995, Nevile was Lord Lieutenant of Lincolnshire, and, in 1985, he was appointed High Steward of Lincoln Cathedral. A liveryman of the Worshipful Company of Farmers, he served as its master between 1991 and 1992; in 1992, he was appointed a Knight Commander of the Royal Victorian Order. He died on 20 October 1996, leaving an estate valued at £3,369,074 net.

Honorary titles
Preceded by The Earl of Ancaster	Lord Lieutenant of Lincolnshire; 1975–1995	Succeeded by Bridget Cracroft-Eley
