= Néville =

- Commune
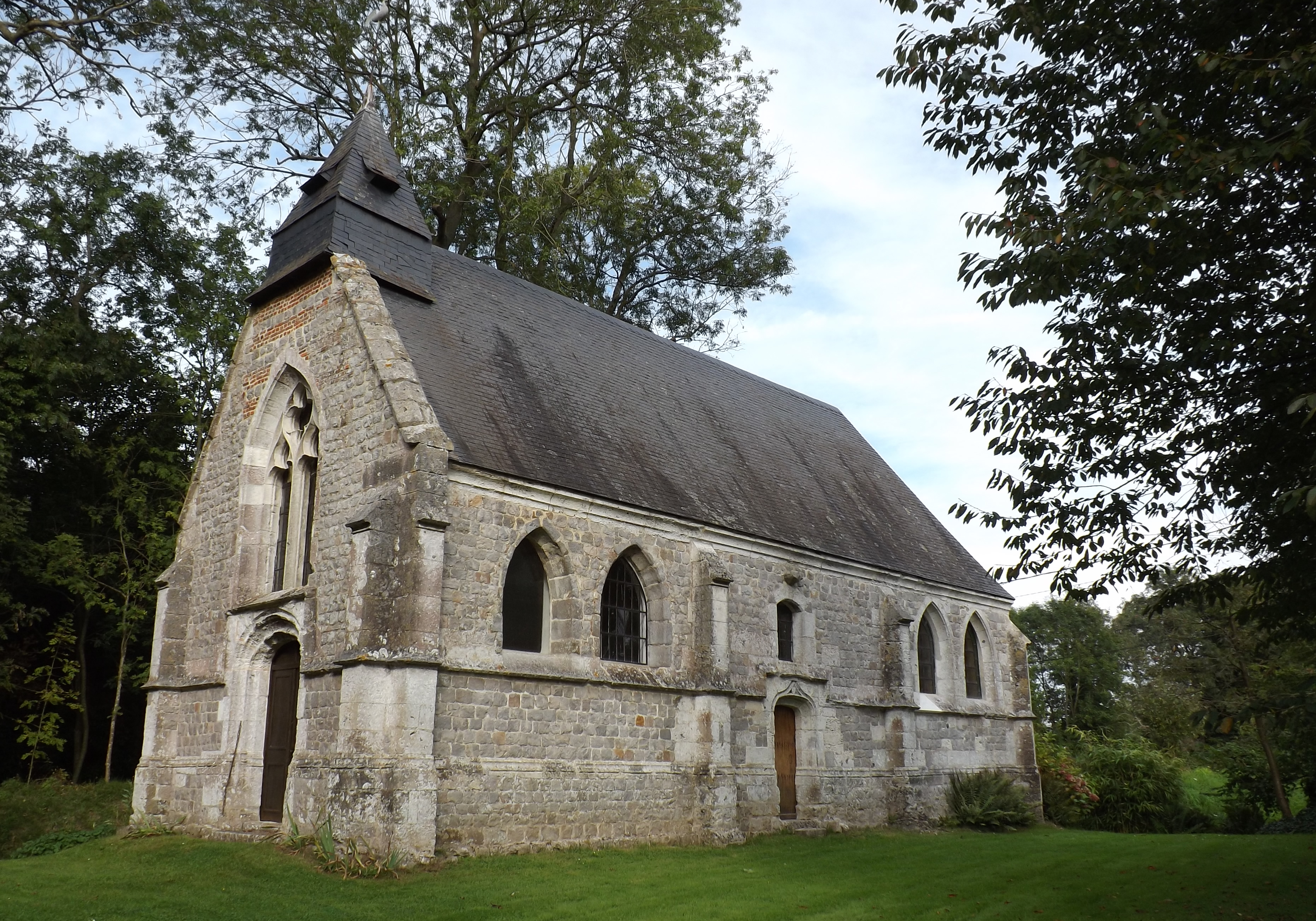
- The chapel of Saint-Jean-Baptiste de Pleine-Sevette

- Coat of arms
- Location of Néville
- Location within France Location within Normandy
- Coordinates: 49°49′25″N 0°42′28″E
- Country: France
- Region: Normandy
- Department: Seine-Maritime
- Arrondissement: Dieppe
- Canton: Saint-Valery-en-Caux
- Intercommunality: CC Côte d'Albâtre

Government
  - Mayor (2020–2026): André-Pierre Bourdon
- Area^{1}: 9.23 km^{2} (3.56 sq mi)
- Elevation: 80 m (260 ft)
- Highest elevation: 91 m (299 ft)
- Lowest elevation: 20 m (66 ft)
- Population (2023): 1,300
  - Density: 140/km^{2} (360/sq mi)
- Time zone: UTC+01:00 (CET)
  - Summer (DST): UTC+02:00 (CEST)
- INSEE/Postal code: 76467 /76460
- ^{1} French Land Register data, which excludes lakes, ponds, glaciers > 1 km^{2} (0.386 sq mi or 247 acres) and river estuaries.

Néville (French pronunciation: [nevil]) is a commune in the Seine-Maritime department in the Normandy region in northern France.

== Geography ==
A farming village situated in the Pays de Caux at the junction of the D53, D69 and the D105 roads, some 21 miles (34 km) southwest of Dieppe .

== Heraldry ==
Arms of Néville	The arms of Néville are blazoned : Paly Or and azure, on a chief gules 3 escallops argent.

== Population ==
Historical population
Year	Pop.	±% p.a.
1968	679	—
1975	559	−2.74%
1982	883	+6.75%
1990	1,109	+2.89%
1999	1,090	−0.19%
2007	1,102	+0.14%
2012	1,154	+0.93%
2017	1,306	+2.51%
2023	1,300	−0.08%
Source: INSEE

== Places of interest ==
- The church of St.Martin, dating from the thirteenth century.
- Vestiges of a feudal castle.
- The sixteenth century chapel of Saint-Jean-Baptiste at Pleine-Sévette.

== See also ==
- Communes of the Seine-Maritime department
