= Vught =

- Town and municipality
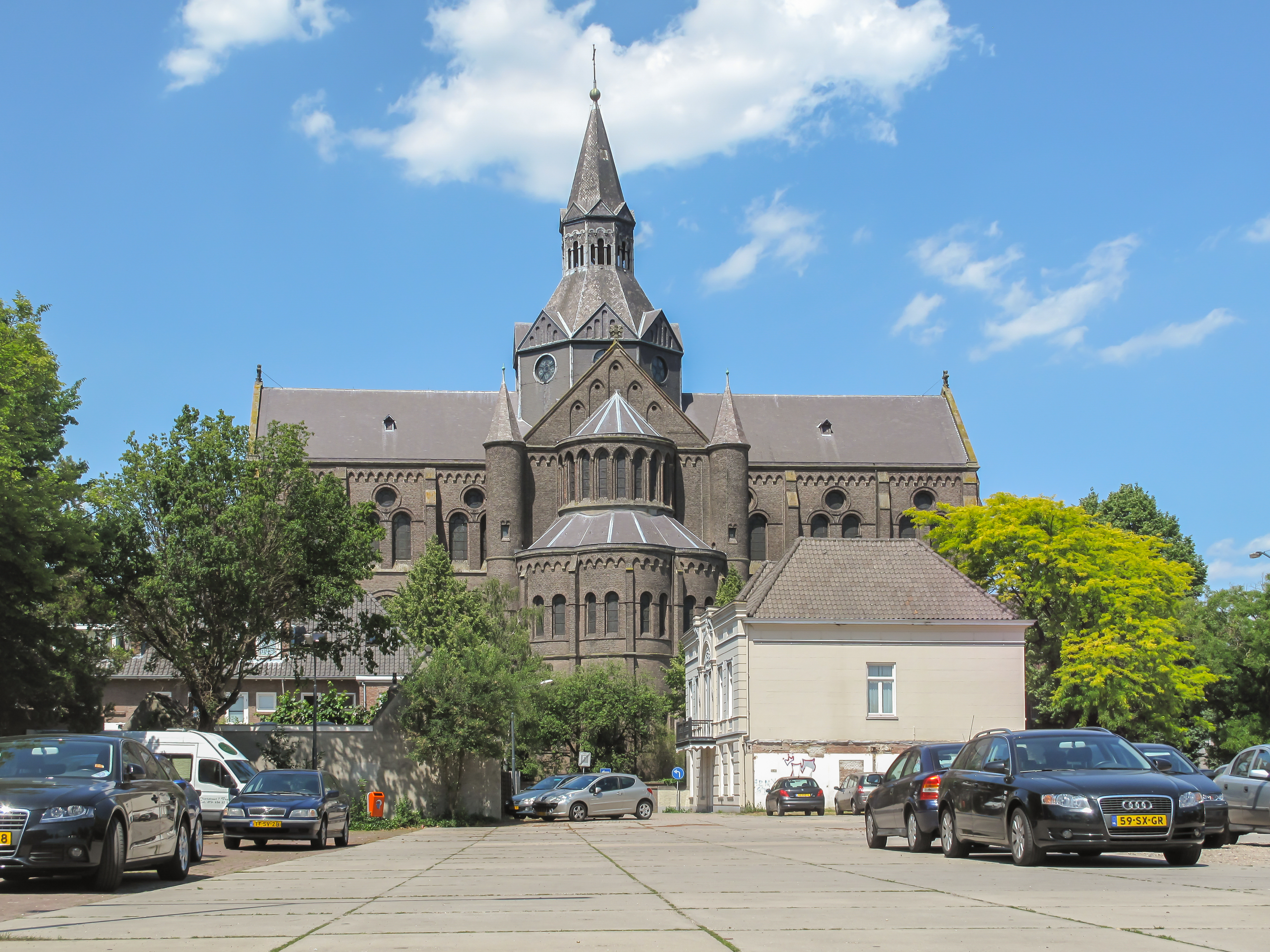
- Former Saint Peter church in Vught

- Flag Coat of arms

- Location in North Brabant

- Location within Netherlands Location within North Brabant
- Coordinates: 51°39′N 5°18′E
- Country: Netherlands
- Province: North Brabant

Government
  - Body: Municipal council
  - Mayor: Chantal Nijkerken de Haan (VVD)

Area
  - Total: 34.69 km^{2} (13.39 sq mi)
  - Land: 33.75 km^{2} (13.03 sq mi)
  - Water: 0.94 km^{2} (0.36 sq mi)
- Elevation: 5 m (16 ft)

Population (January 2021)
  - Total: 31,669
  - Density: 938/km^{2} (2,430/sq mi)
- Demonym: Vughtenaar
- Time zone: UTC+1 (CET)
  - Summer (DST): UTC+2 (CEST)
- Postcode: 5260–5266
- Area code: 0411, 073
- Website: vught.nl

Vught (Dutch pronunciation: [vʏxt]) is a municipality and a town in the Province of North Brabant in the southern Netherlands, and lies just south of the industrial and administrative centre of 's-Hertogenbosch. Many commuters live there, and in 2004 the town was named "Best place to live" by the Dutch magazine Elsevier.

== Population centres ==
- Cromvoirt
- Helvoirt
- Vught

=== Topography ===
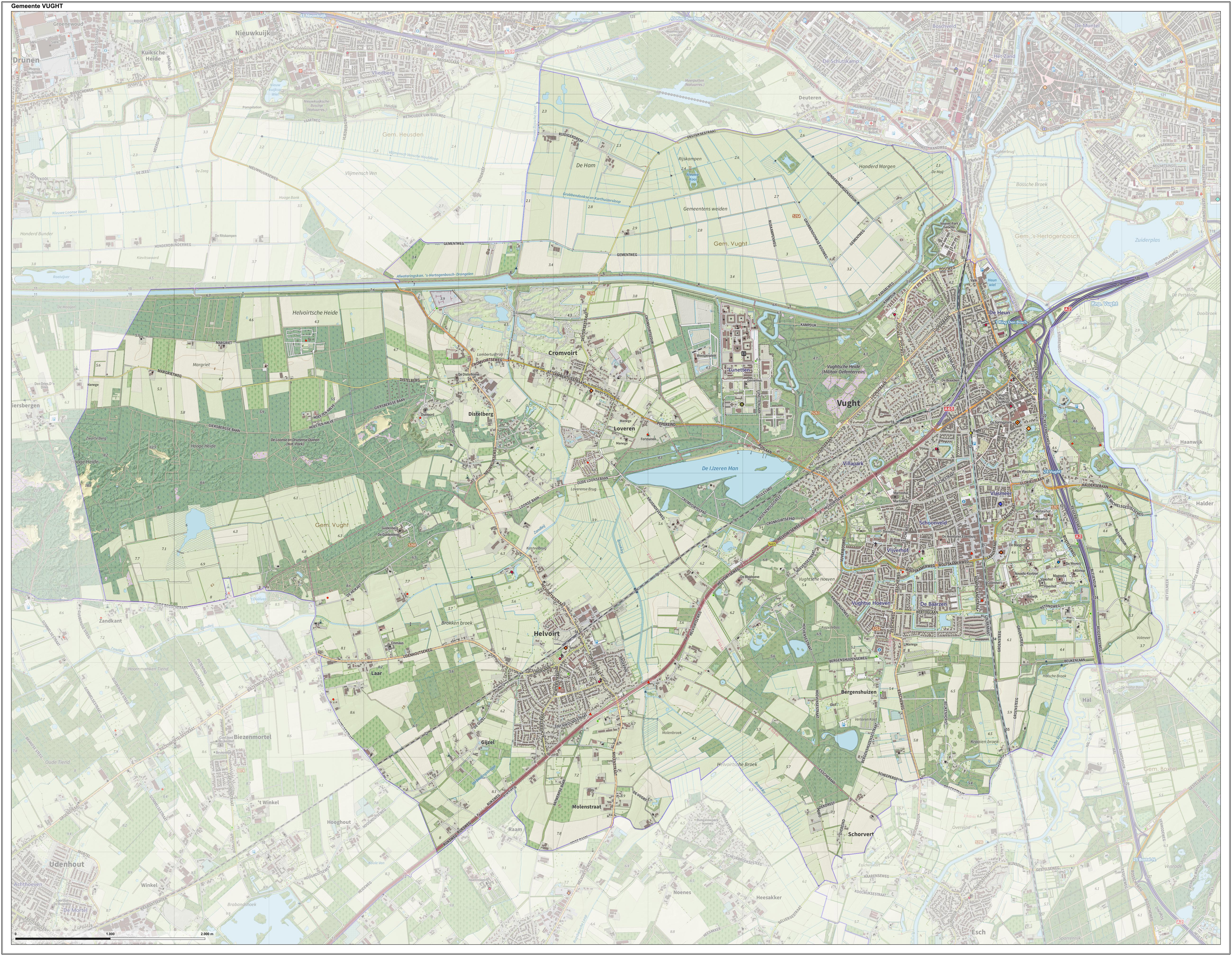
Map of the municipality of Vught, 2021

== History ==
=== Early history ===
The first mention of Vught in the historical record dates to the eleventh century. By the fourteenth century, the Teutonic Order had acquired the parish and set up a commandery across from the Saint Lambert Church. In 1328, the residents of Vught were granted the right of municipality by the Duke of Brabant.

=== Eighty Years War ===
During the Eighty Years War Vught was the site of struggles between Catholic interests and the troops of William of Orange. In 1629 the Saint Lambert Church became a Reformed Protestant church, after the troops of Frederick Henry, Prince of Orange, were victorious in 's-Hertogenbosch.

=== World War II ===
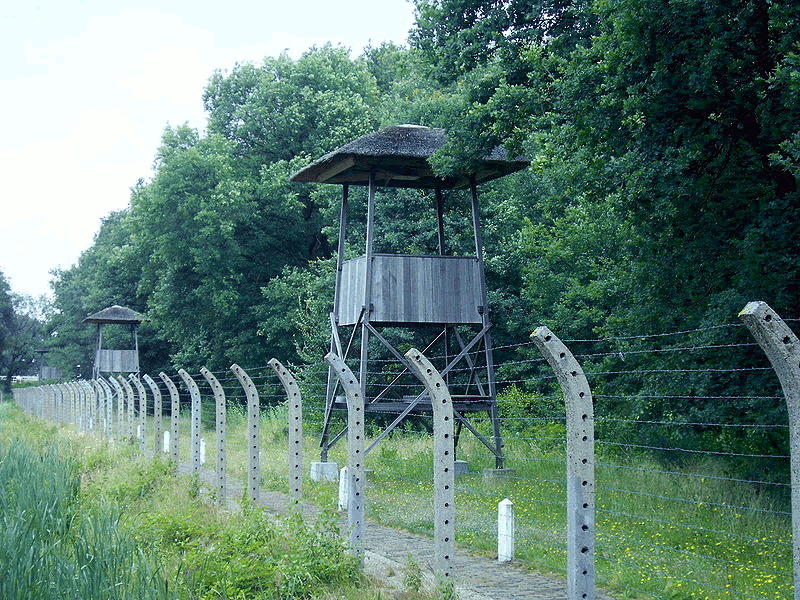
Watchtowers and barbed wire fences at Herzogenbusch concentration camp in Vught

Vught was the site of a transit/concentration camp (Herzogenbusch) built by Nazi Germany during its occupation of the Netherlands in World War II. It was part of Camp Herzogenbusch, but usually better known as "Kamp Vught". The camp held male and female prisoners, many of them Jewish and political activists, captured in Belgium and the Netherlands. The guards included SS men and a few SS women, headed by Oberaufseherin Margarete Gallinat. The SS initially used it as a transit camp to gather mostly Jewish prisoners for classification and transportation to camps in Poland and other areas.

For supporting another female prisoner, a group of 74 women were punished by being placed in a cell barely nine square meters and held there for over fourteen hours. Ten of the women died, and several suffered permanent physical or mental damage. The camp commander responsible was demoted by Himmler to the regular rank of soldier and sent to the Hungarian front, where he died in 1945.

Dutch underground members Corrie and Betsie ten Boom were held at Vught in 1944, before being sent to Ravensbrück concentration camp. Vught was also a transition camp for many of the female laborers at the Agfa Kamerawerke in München-Giesing, where they built ignition and camera devices. Poncke Princen, who would later become known for going over to the Indonesian guerrillas opposing Dutch rule, was imprisoned at Vught for his anti-Nazi activities.

Vught was liberated by the Canadians at the end of the war, but only after German guards killed several hundred prisoners held there, mainly by firing squad.

=== Camp in post-war times ===
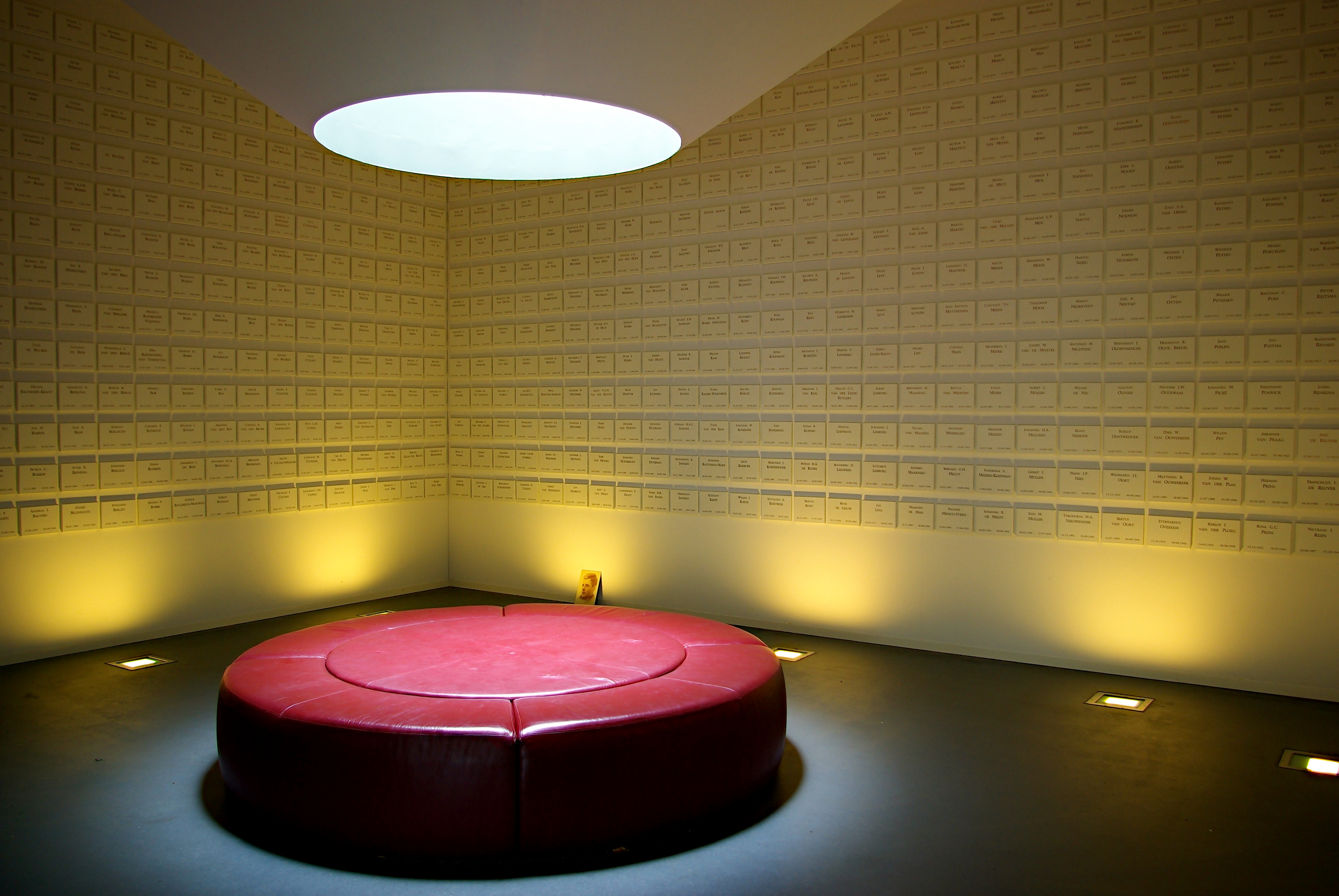
Bezinningsruimte ("Room for reflection") at the Nationaal Monument Kamp Vught. It shows the names of all those who did not survive imprisonment at the Kamp Vught.

After World War II, the camp was first used as a prison for Germans and collaborators. Some of the camp has been preserved as a national monument related to the Nazi occupation during World War II.

The barracks of Camp Vught were later adapted into a number of home units to house Indonesian Moluccan exiles, former soldiers of the Netherlands armed forces and their families who were transferred to the Netherlands after Indonesian independence.

=== Department of corrections — PI Vught ===
From 1953, part of the former detention camp was developed as a juvenile prison called Nieuw Vosseveld.' Today, as PI Vught, it is a high-security prison with 15 separate units and up to 750 prisoners. Amongst those imprisoned there are:

- Samir Azzouz, terrorist with ties to Hofstad Network. Released in 2013.
- Mohammed Bouyeri, murderer of Theo van Gogh. Serving a life sentence without parole.
- Willem Holleeder, one of the perpetrators in the kidnapping of Freddy Heineken. Life imprisonment.
- Johan Verhoek, nicknamed de hakkelaar, drug dealer. Released in 2000.
- Curtis Warren, British drug trafficker. Released in 2007.
- Ridouan Taghi, drug trafficker and murderer.

== Politics ==
On 2 April 2025 Chantal Nijkerken-de Haan was inaugurated as mayor of Vught. The aldermen are Mark du Maine (VVD), Yvonne Vos (CDA) and Jos den Otter (Gemeentebelangen).

== Landmarks ==
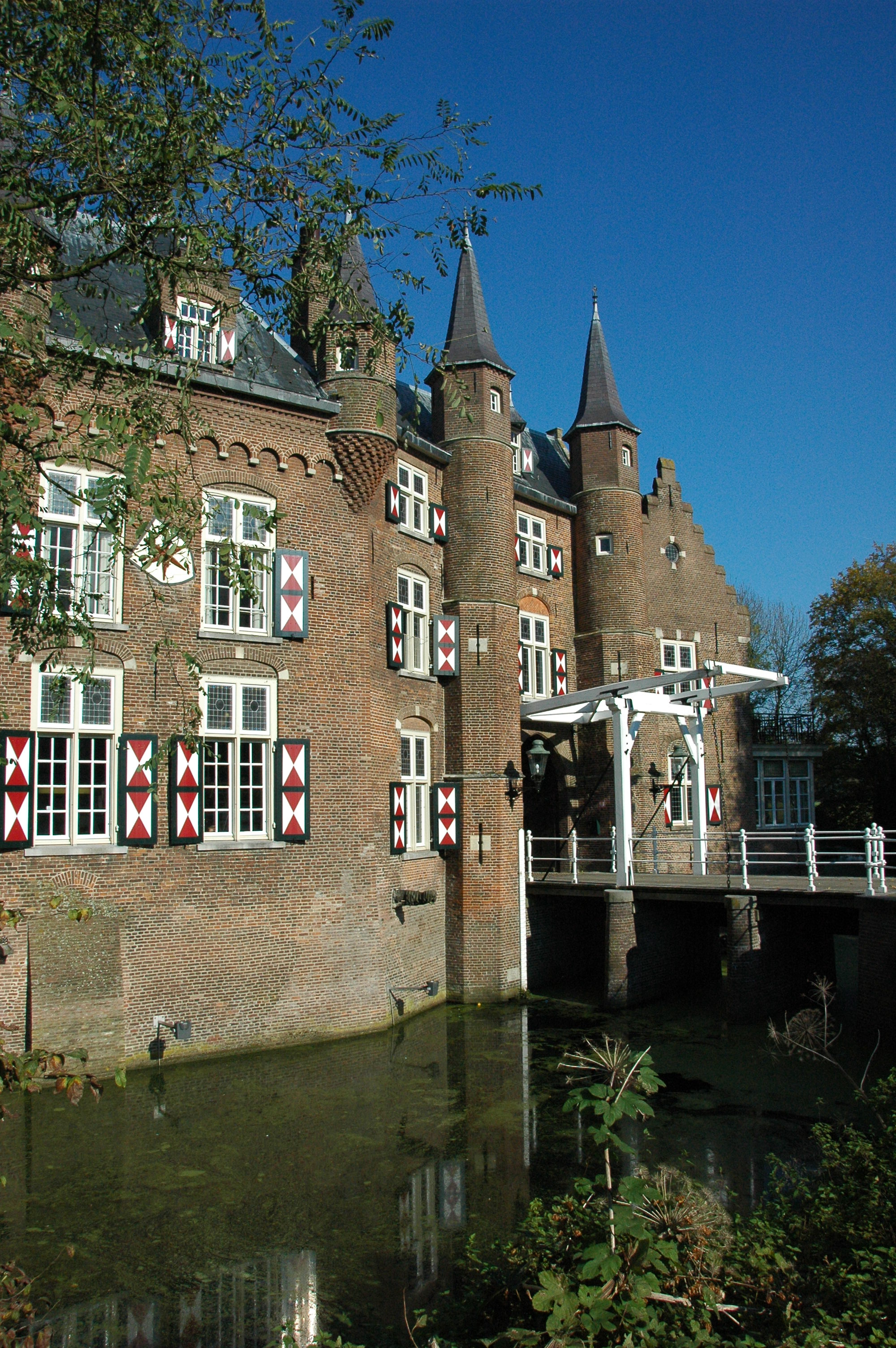
Maurick Castle

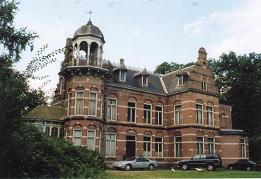
Zionsburg, Vught

Just outside the town border lies the lake IJzeren Man (literally 'Iron Man'). It was named after the machine that dug it in the years 1890 to 1915 for sand used as fill for the expansion of the nearby city of 's-Hertogenbosch. The lake is about 2 kilometers long, has a small island and is now mainly used for recreation.

Maurick Castle dates back to the 13th century. In 1629 it was occupied by Frederick Henry, Prince of Orange as his headquarters for his siege of 's-Hertogenbosch. The castle now houses a restaurant.

Vught is home to the Bredero barracks, which houses the Ministry of Defence's CBRN defense training center.

After the village of Helvoirt and surroundings had been transferred from the former municipality of Haaren to Vught in 2021, the eastern part of the Loonse en Drunense Duinen national park became part of the municipality.

=== Ewald Marggraff ===
Ewald Marggraff was a well-to-do nobleman who lived in Vught. A hermit, he acquired a large amount of land and several buildings. He had frequent disputes with the local authorities, mostly over his decision to let his properties deteriorate. This enabled his land to return to natural habitat, with animal species living there that had disappeared elsewhere. On 7 December 2003 Marggraff's manor (Zionsburg) burned down; his body was later found inside.

Marggraff's surviving sisters founded a non-profit corporation, Marggraff stichting, to take over and manage their late brother's extensive landholdings, providing public access to the forests, and rebuilding Zionsburg.

== Transport ==
Vught has a railway station with connections to Amsterdam/Utrecht via 's-Hertogenbosch, Maastricht via Eindhoven, Tilburg and Nijmegen. Highway 2 / E25 and Highway 65 / N93 intersect at Vught. Also two Arriva buslines connecting Vught to the Jeroen Bosch Hospital, school district and central station, all located in neighbouring Den Bosch.

== Notable residents ==
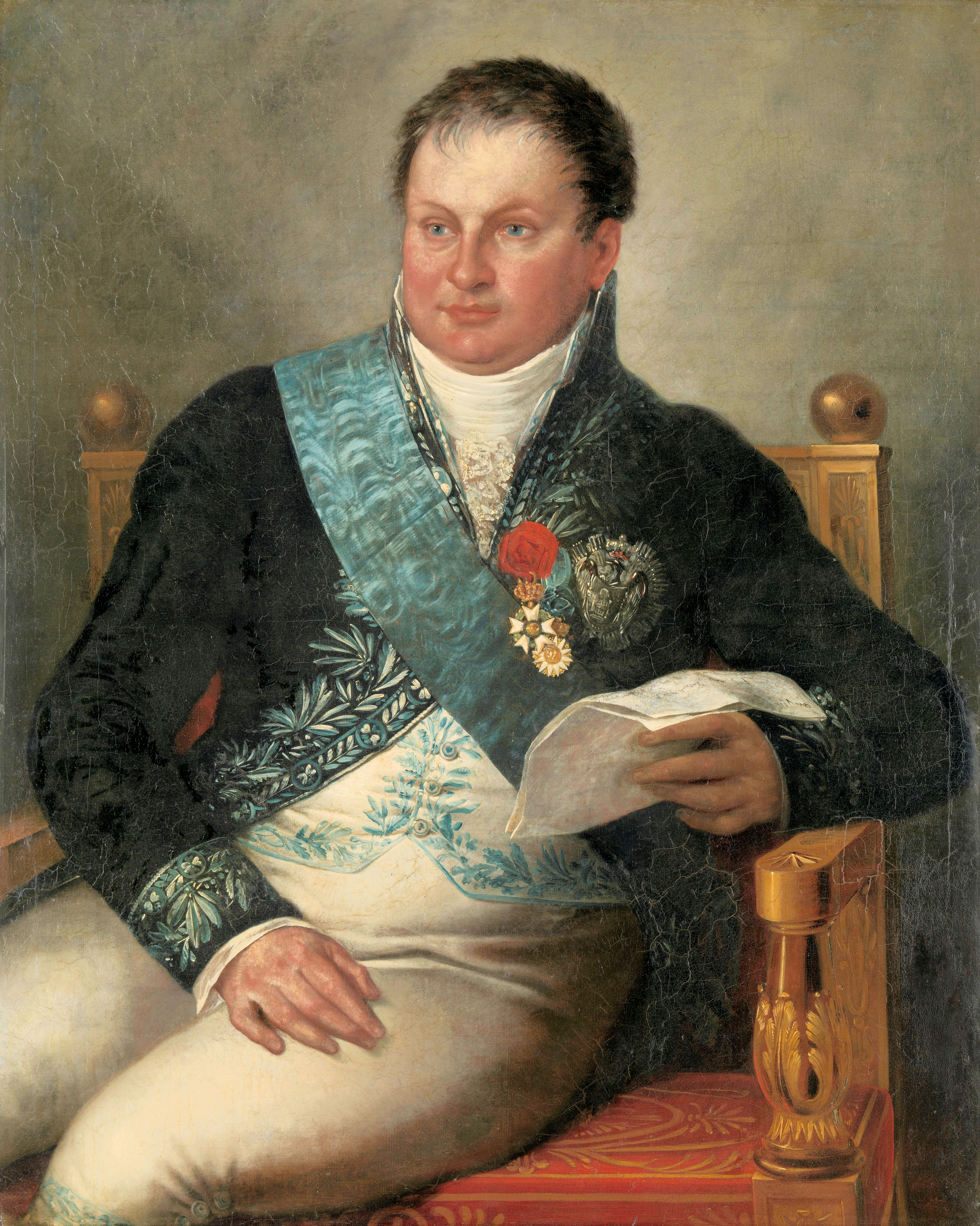
Isaac Gogel, c. 1812

=== Public service ===
- Alexander Gogel (1765 in Vught–1821) first minister of finance of the Batavian Republic
- Betsie ten Boom (1885–1944) & Corrie ten Boom (1892–1983), sisters, who hid Jewish families in their home and were held at Kamp Vught in WWII
- Frans Teulings (1891–1966 in Vught) a politician and deputy prime minister 1951/1952
- Anton de Kom (1898–1945) Surinamese resistance fighter and anti-colonialist author
- Damiaen Joan van Doorninck (1902 in Vught–1987) a naval officer and a POW in Colditz
- Ewald Marggraff (1923 in Vught–2003) see narrative above
- Edy Korthals Altes (1924 in Vught–2021) economist, Dutch diplomat and peace advocate
- Ad Geelhoed (1942 in Vught–2007) a law professor, civil servant and advocate-general of the European Court of Justice
- Martinus Theodorus van Genuchten (born 1945 in Vught) soil physicist who received Wolf Prize in Agriculture
- Jeroen Oerlemans (1970 in Vught–2016) a photographer and war correspondent

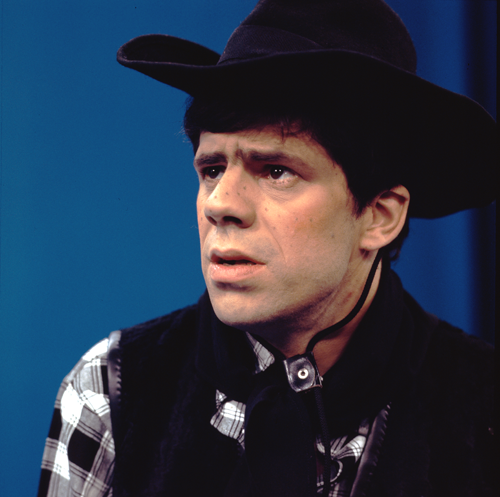
Joost Prinsen, 1973

=== The arts ===
- Erna Spoorenberg (1925–2004 in Vught) a soprano
- Misha Geller (1937–2007 in Vught) a Russian viola player and composer
- Jan Pijnenburg (1955–2026 in Vught) a drummer and session musician
- Joost Prinsen (born 1942 in Vught–2025) an actor, TV presenter, singer and writer
- Mina Witteman (born 1959 in Vught) a children's author
- Maarten van der Vleuten (born 1967 in Vught) a producer, composer and recording artist
- Jan-Hein Arens (born 1974 in Vught) a painter, sculptor and illustrator

=== Sport ===
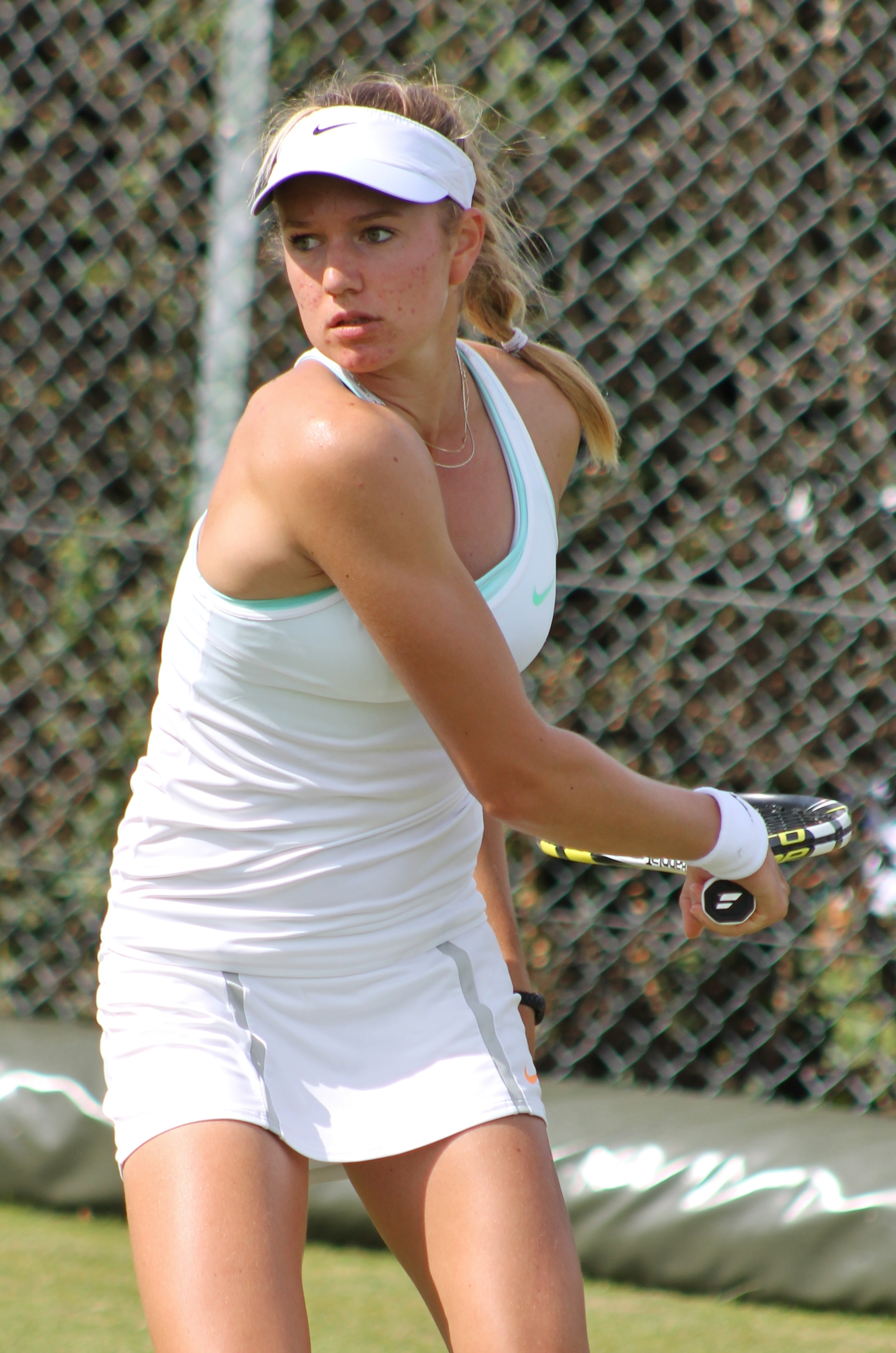
Indy de Vroome, 2014

- Tonny van Lierop (1910 in Vught–1982) a Dutch field hockey player and team bronze medallist in the 1936 Summer Olympics
- Pierre Hermans (born 1953 in Vught) a former field hockey goalkeeper, competed at the 1984 Summer Olympics
- Harry Schulting (born 1956) a Dutch Olympian at the 400 meter hurdles and Dutch record holder, lives and works in Vught
- Simon Tahamata (born 1956 in Vught) a former Dutch / Maluku Islands / Belgian footballer with 604 club caps
- Bas de Bever (born 1968 in Vught) a Dutch former professional BMX racer
- Martijn Bok (born 1973) a retired Dutch tennis player, lives in Vught
- Vincent Kortbeek (born 1982 in Vught) as retired Dutch Olympian in bobsleigh
- Paul Beekmans (born 1982 in Vught) a football manager and former player with 280 club caps
- Koen van de Laak (born 1982 in Vught) a former professional footballer with 290 club caps
- Wouter van der Steen (born 1990 in Vught) a Dutch professional football goalkeeper with nearly 200 club caps
- Indy de Vroome (born 1996 in Cromvoirt) a Dutch tennis player

== See also ==
- Joop Westerweel, resistance fighter during World War II
- Heikant, Vught, former hamlet near Vught

== Gallery ==
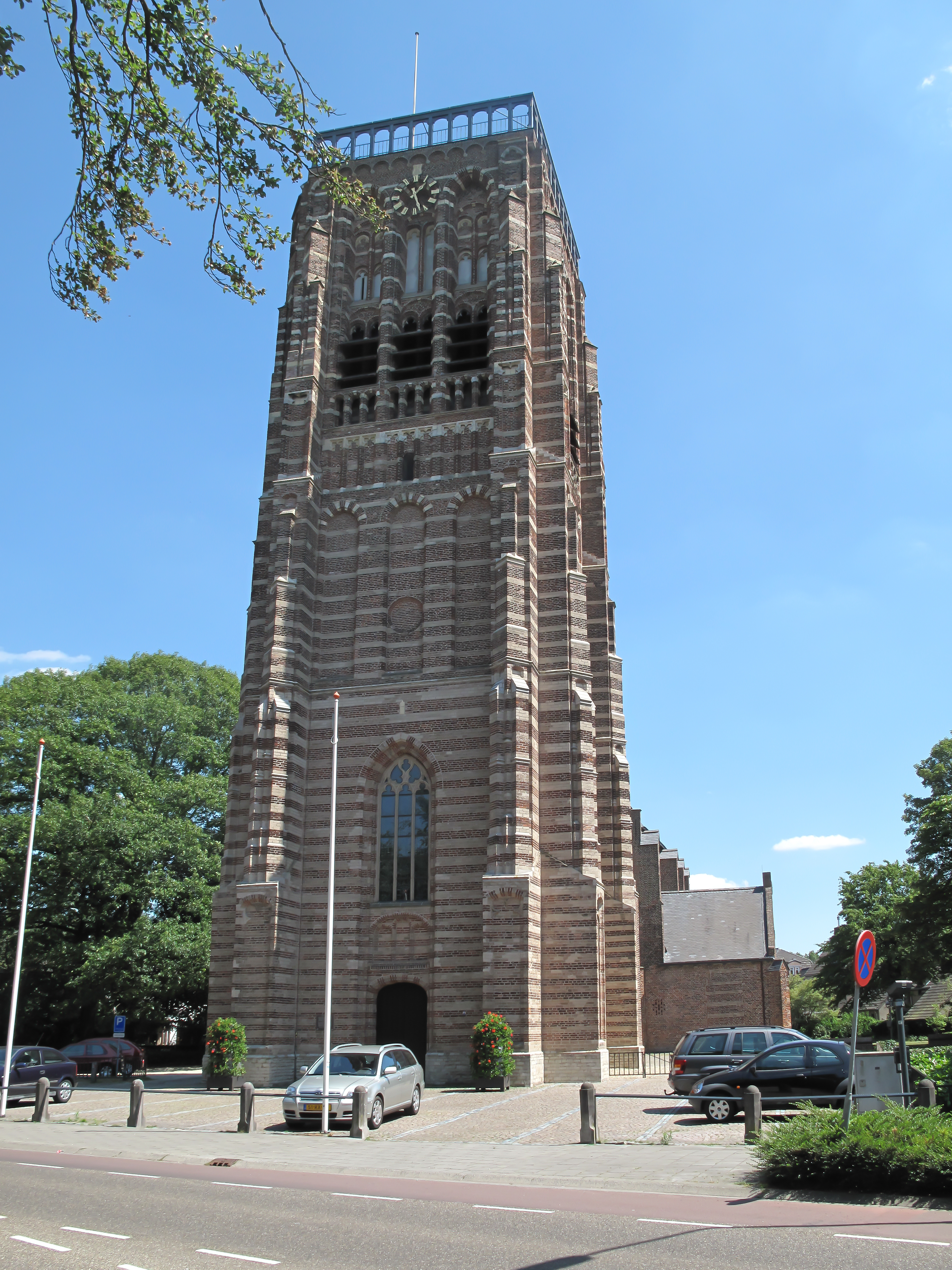
Vught, church: Vughtse toren

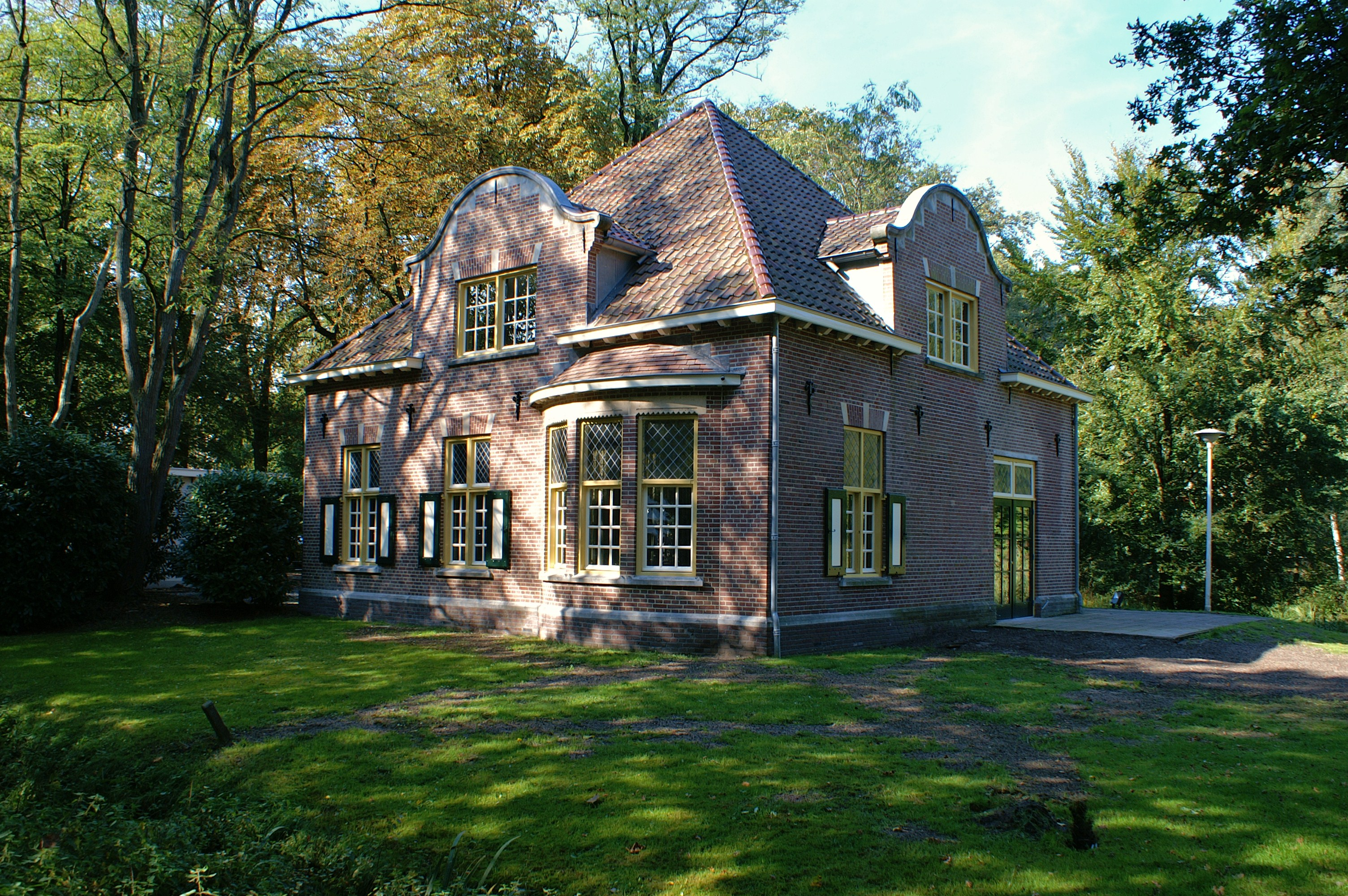
Roucouleur rectorswoning, Vught

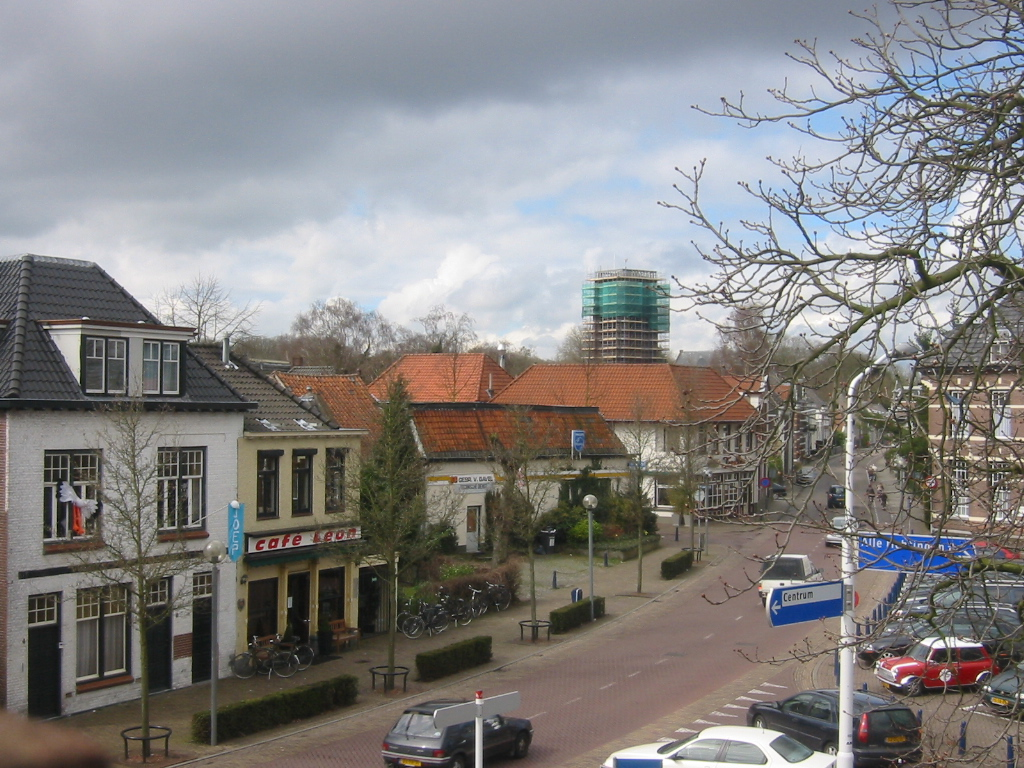
Maurick square, Vught

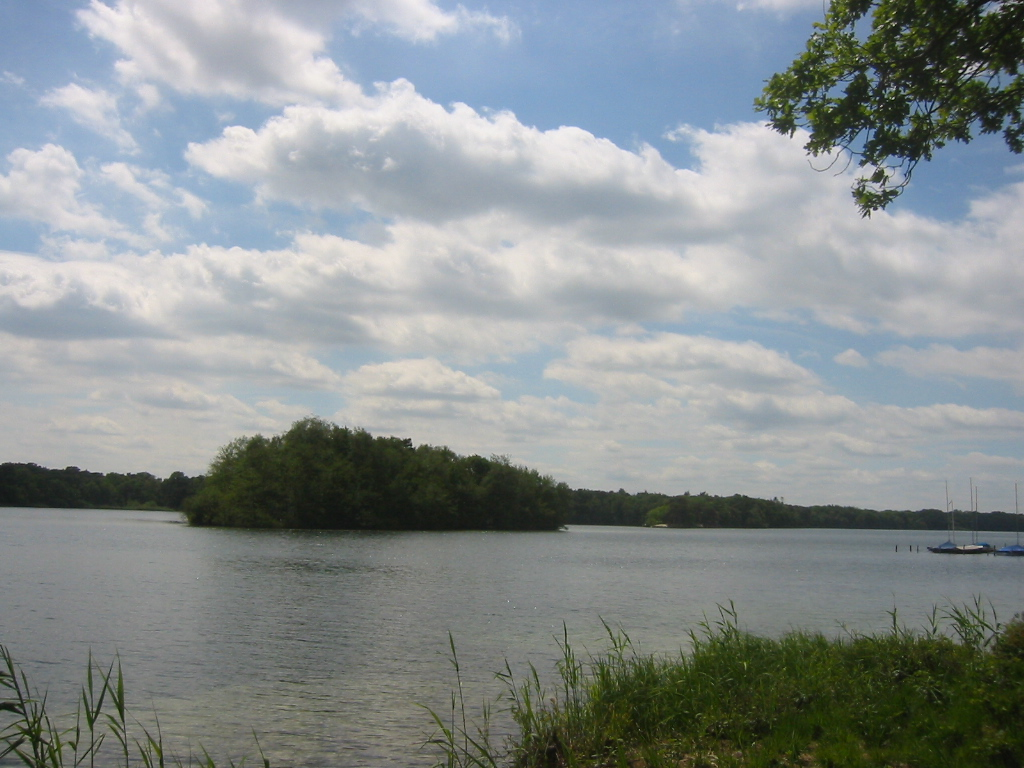
IJzeren Man lake, Vught
