= Heikant =

Heikant may refer to:

== Netherlands ==
=== Province of North Brabant ===
- Heikant, Alphen-Chaam, near Chaam
- Heikant, Oordeel or "Oordeel Heikant", near Baarle-Nassau
- Heikant, Ulicoten, near Ulicoten in Baarle-Nassau
- Heikant, Bladel, near Hoogeloon
- Heikant, Sambeek, in the municipality of Boxmeer
- Heikant, Overloon, in the municipality of Boxmeer
- Heikant, Cranendonck, near Budel
- Heikant, Gastel, a former hamlet
- Heikant, Rijen, a former hamlet near Rijen in Gilze en Rijen
- Heikant, Hilvarenbeek, near Diessen
- Heikant, Laarbeek, near Aarle-Rixtel
- Heikant, Loon op Zand
- Heikant, Oisterwijk, near Moergestel
- Heikant, Oosterhout
- Heikant, Reusel-De Mierden, near Hulsel
- Heikant, Rucphen, near Sprundel
- Heikant, Sint Anthonis, near Oploo
- Heikant, Someren
- Heikant, Tilburg, a suburb in the north of the city of Tilburg
- Heikant, Veldhoven
- Heikant, Uden, near Volkel
- Heikant, Helvoirt, former hamlet near Helvoirt in Vught
- Heikant, Vught, a former hamlet near Vught
- Heikant, Waalre

=== Other provinces ===
- Heikant, Berg en Dal, a former hamlet in Gelderland
- Heikant, Mook en Middelaar, a hamlet in Limburg
- Heikant, Zeeland, a village in Zeeland

== Belgium ==
- Heikant, Brasschaat, a small village 3 km south of Brasschaat in the province of Antwerp
- Heikant, Heist-op-den-Berg, a small village 3 km west of Heist-op-den-Berg in the province of Antwerp
- Heikant, Hoogstraten, a small village 6 km east of Hoogstraten in the province of Antwerp
- Heikant, Kalmthout, a small village 2 km east of Kalmthout in the province of Antwerp
- Heikant, Limburg, a small village 4 km west of Lanaken in the province of Limburg
- Heikant, Lokeren, a small village 2 km south of Lokeren in the province of East Flanders
- Heikant, Nijlen, a small village in the municipality of Nijlen in the province of Antwerp
- Heikant, Rotselaar, a small village 2 km northeast of Rotselaar in the province of Flemish Brabant
- Heikant, Stekene, a small village 3 km northwest of Stekene in the province of East Flanders
