= Udenhout =

- Town
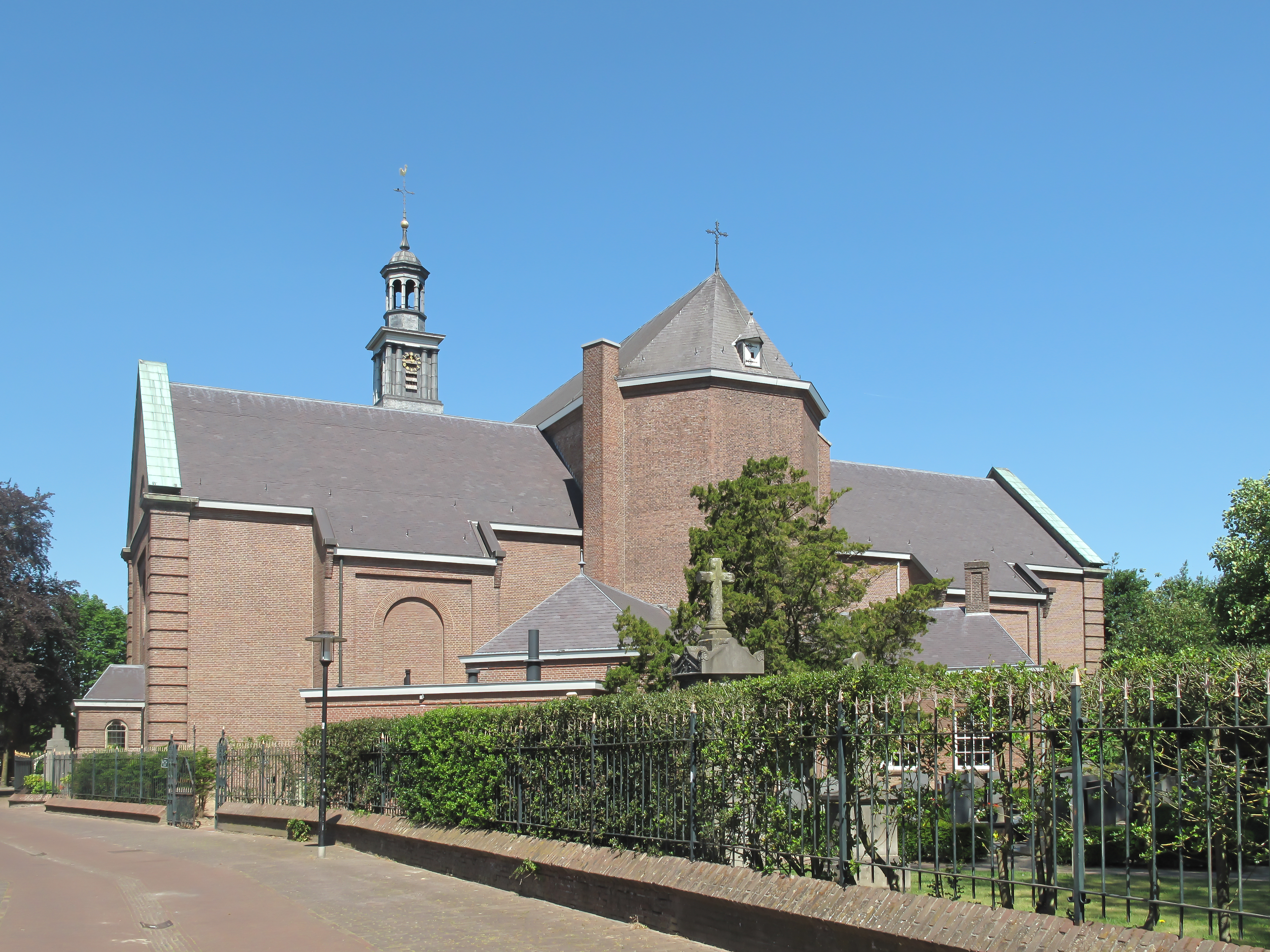
- Udenhout, Saint Lambert's Church (Sint Lambertuskerk)

- Flag Coat of arms

- Location in the province of North Brabant in the Netherlands Udenhout (Netherlands)
- Coordinates: 51°36′30″N 5°8′30″E
- Country: Netherlands
- Province: North Brabant
- Municipality: Tilburg

Area
  - Total: 17.78 km^{2} (6.86 sq mi)
- Elevation: 10 m (33 ft)

Population (2021)
  - Total: 8,440
  - Density: 475/km^{2} (1,230/sq mi)
- Time zone: UTC+1 (CET)
  - Summer (DST): UTC+2 (CEST)
- Postal code: 5071
- Dialing code: 013
- Major roads: N65

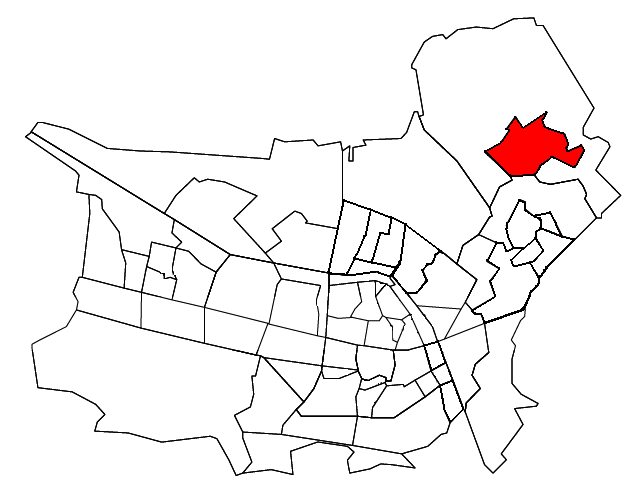
Udenhout in the municipality of Tilburg.

Udenhout is a village and a former municipality in the Dutch province of North Brabant. It is located northeast of Tilburg, north of Berkel-Enschot and south of the National Parc Loonse en Drunense Duinen.

The municipality of Udenhout (including the village of Biezenmortel) was independent until 1997, when it became part of the municipality of Tilburg. Biezenmortel became part of the municipality of Haaren. Udenhout preferred to join the municipality of Loon op Zand, but was nevertheless assigned to Tilburg. The municipality consisted at the time of abolition in 1996 9,028 inhabitants and was 26.87 km^{2}.

During Carnaval Udenhout is called: "d'n Haozepot".

== History ==
The village was first mentioned in 1233 as Odenhout. The etymology is unclear. Udenhout is a linear road village which started to develop at the end of the 18th century.

The Catholic St Lambertus Church was built between 1840 and 1841 in neoclassic style. It was enlarged between 1952 and 1953. Huize St Vincentius was moved from Sint-Michielsgestel to Udenhout in 1925 as part of a will. It served as rectorate and was enlarged between 1927 and 1929. It is nowadays an office building.

The municipality of Udenhout was home to 2,084 people in 1840. It remained an independent municipality until 1997 when it was merged into Tilburg.

== Gallery ==
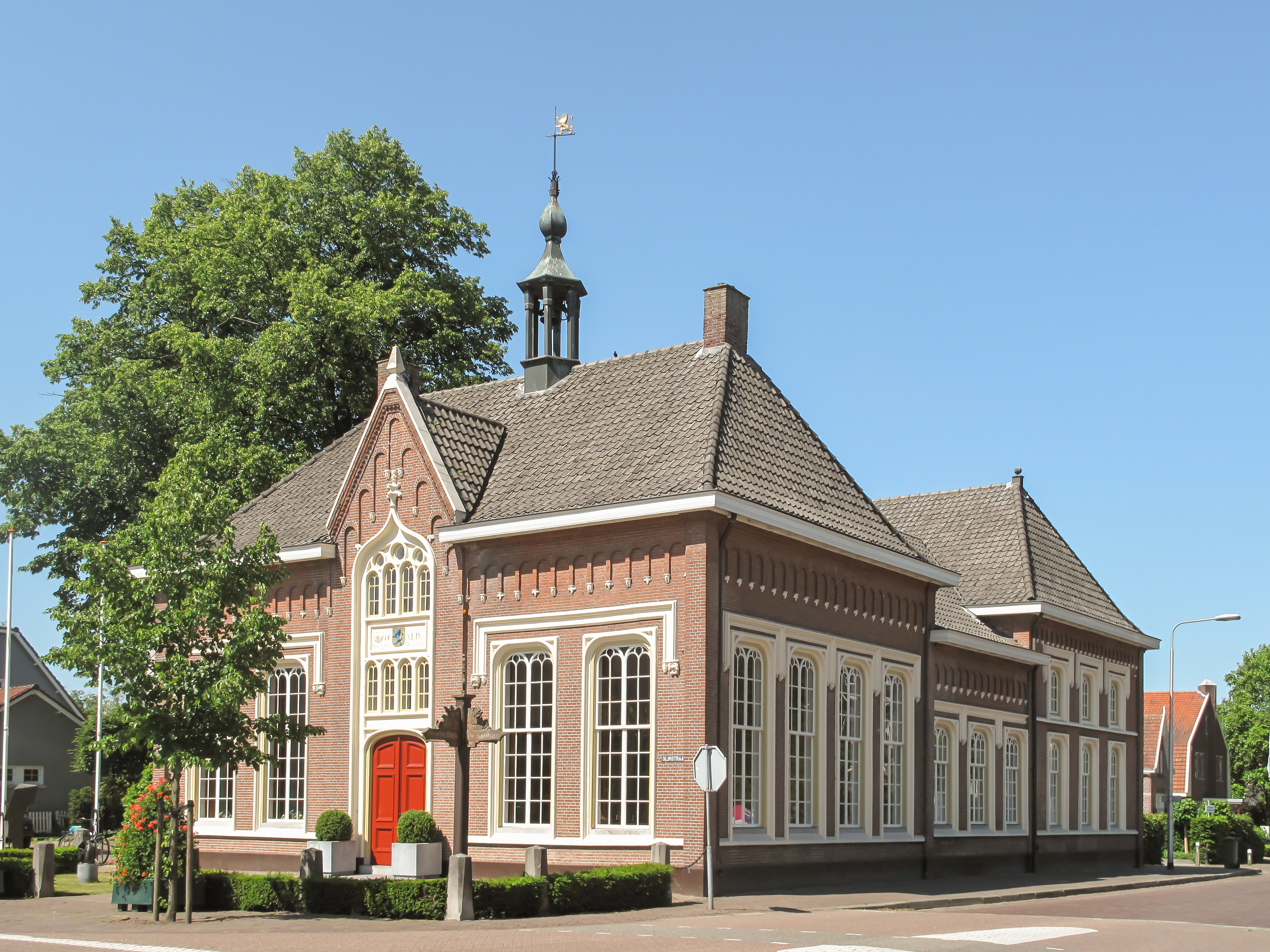
Udenhout, former town hall

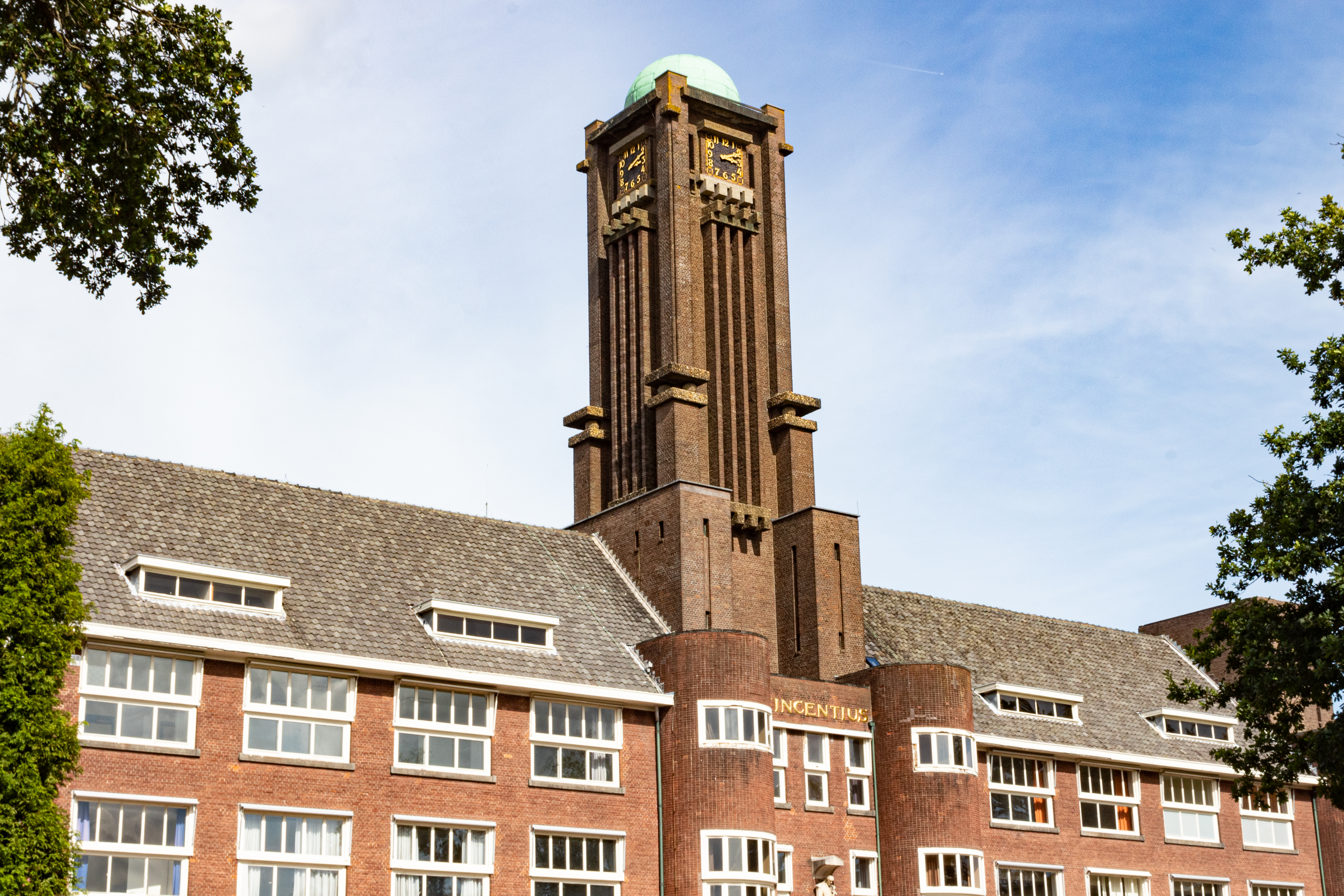
Huize Vincentius

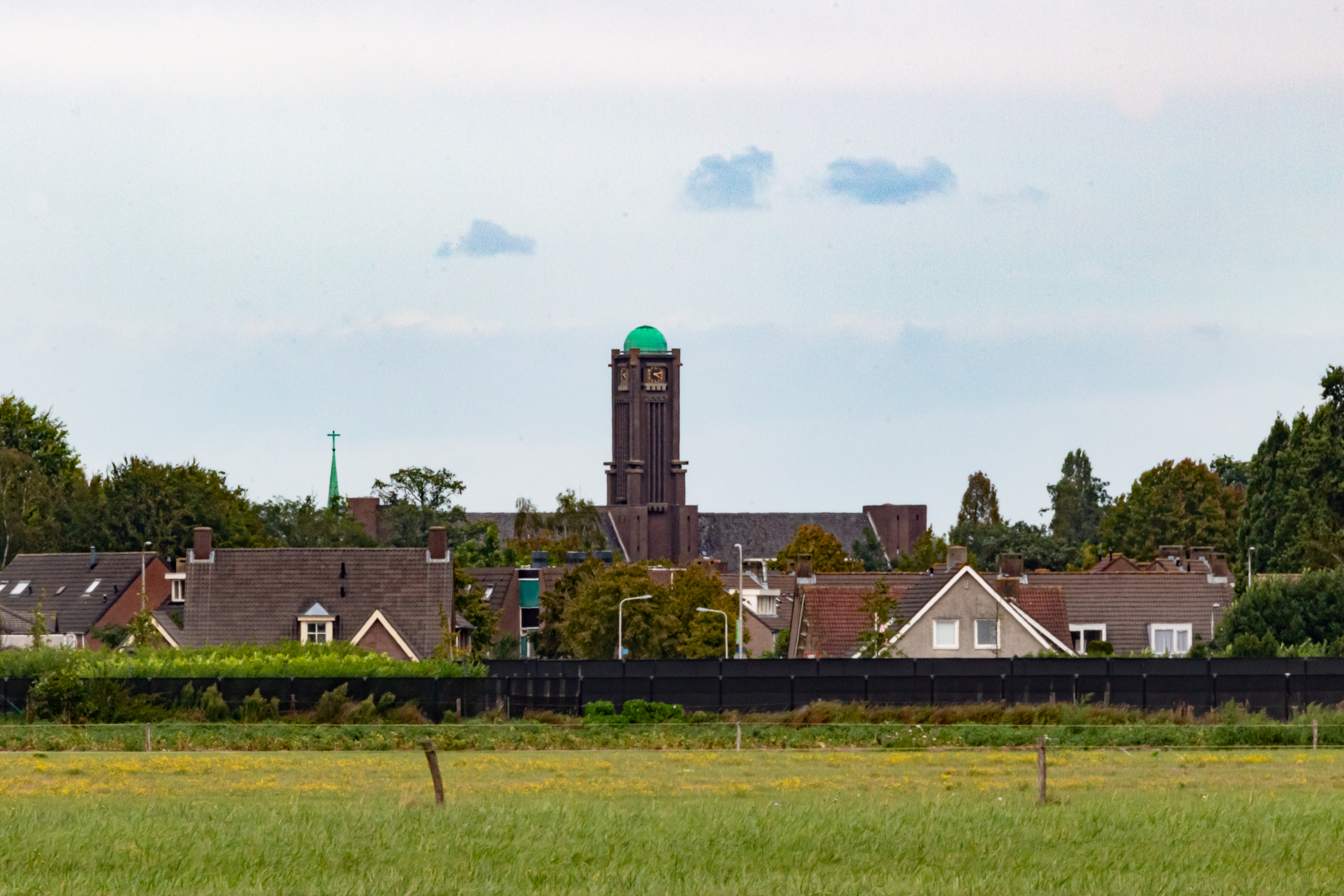
View on Udenhout

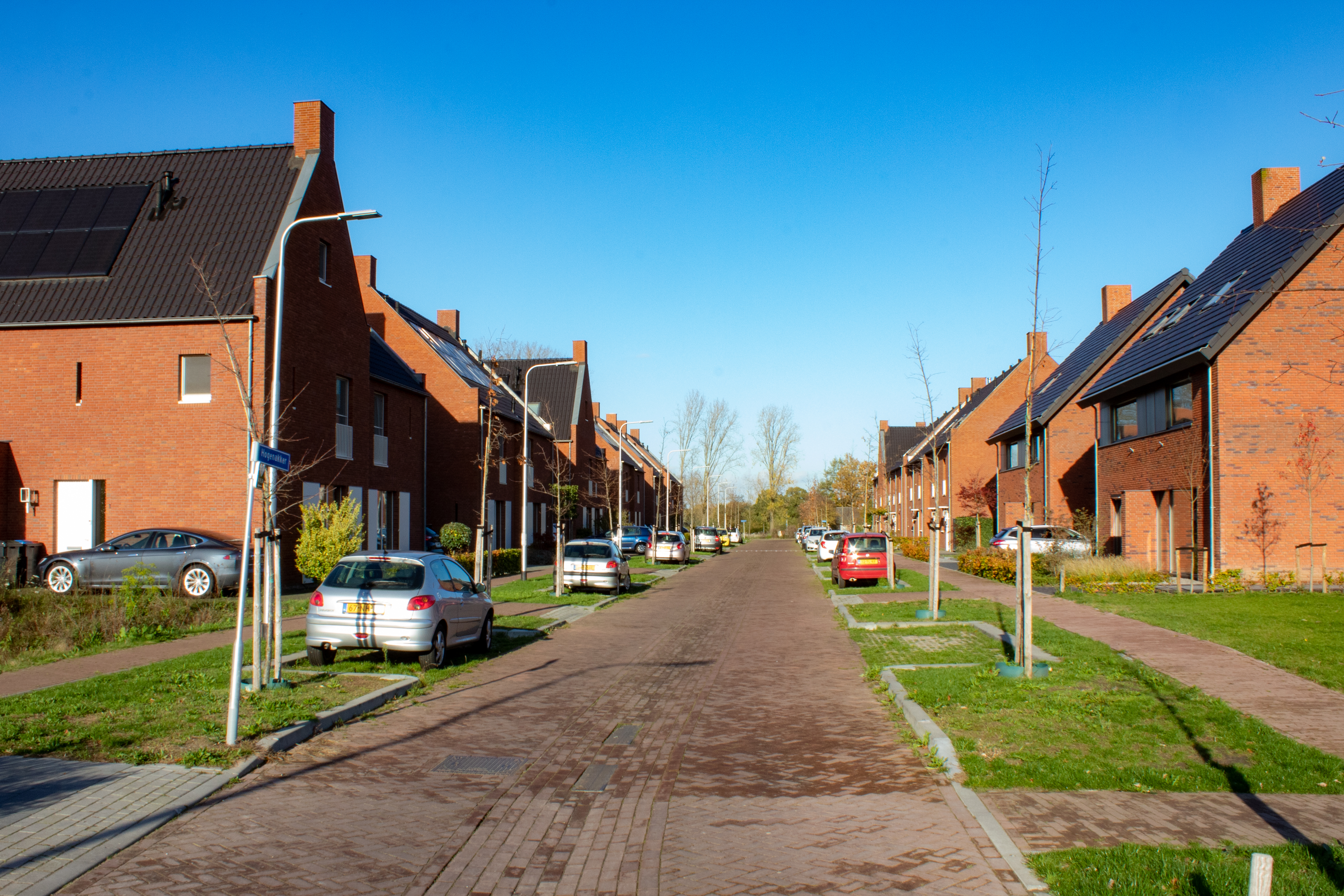
Street view
