= Helvoirt =

- Village
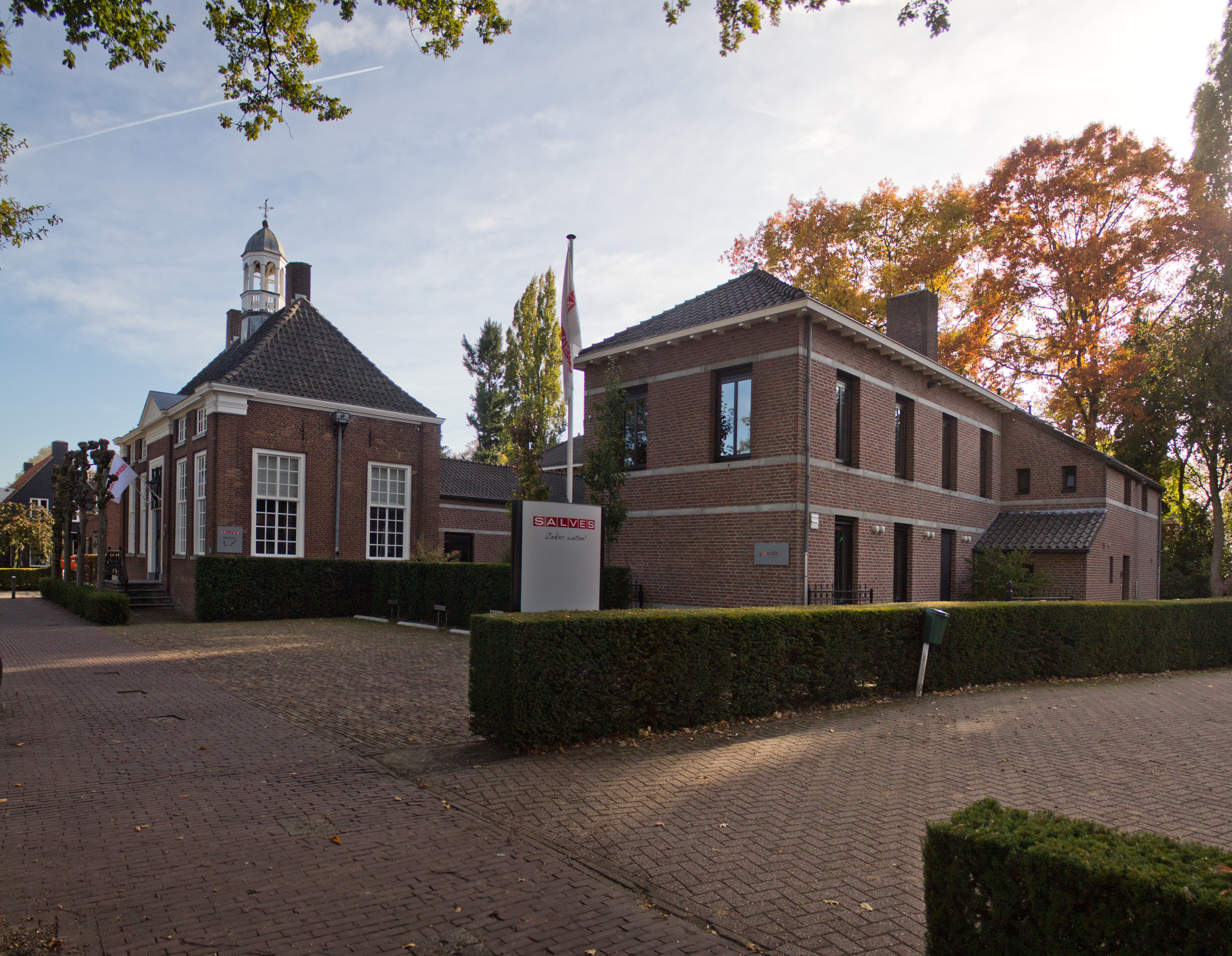
- Former town hall

- Location in the province of North Brabant in the Netherlands Helvoirt (Netherlands)
- Coordinates: 51°38′N 5°14′E
- Country: Netherlands
- Province: North Brabant
- Municipality: Vught

Area
  - Total: 25.65 km^{2} (9.90 sq mi)
- Elevation: 7 m (23 ft)

Population (2021)
  - Total: 4,880
  - Density: 190/km^{2} (493/sq mi)
- Time zone: UTC+1 (CET)
  - Summer (DST): UTC+2 (CEST)
- Postal code: 5268
- Dialing code: 0411
- Major roads: N65
- Website: helvoirt.net

Helvoirt (Dutch pronunciation: [ˈɦɛlvoːrt]) is a village and part of the municipality of Vught, Netherlands.

== History ==
The village was first mentioned in 1192 as Hellevorth, and means "clear fordable place". Helvoirt developed in the Middle Ages on the road from Tilburg to 's-Hertogenbosch. Castle Zwijnsbergen was built near the village and Helvoirt became a heerlijkheid.

The Dutch Reformed church was built in the 15th century. Between 1966 and 1969, it was renovated and part of its predecessor of around 1250 were discovered. The tower was built around 1450. From 1871 to 1875 Theodorus van Gogh, father of the artist Vincent van Gogh, served as Reverend of the Dutch Reformed Church. The Catholic St Nicolaas Church was built between 1901 and 1903 in Gothic Revival style and has a large highly decorated tower.

Helvoirt was home to 878 people in 1840. In 1881, a railway station was built on the Tilburg to Nijmegen railway line. It closed down in 1938, and the building was demolished in 1977.

Helvoirt includes the former hamlet of Heikant. It was a separate municipality until 1996, when it became a part of Haaren.

== Gallery ==
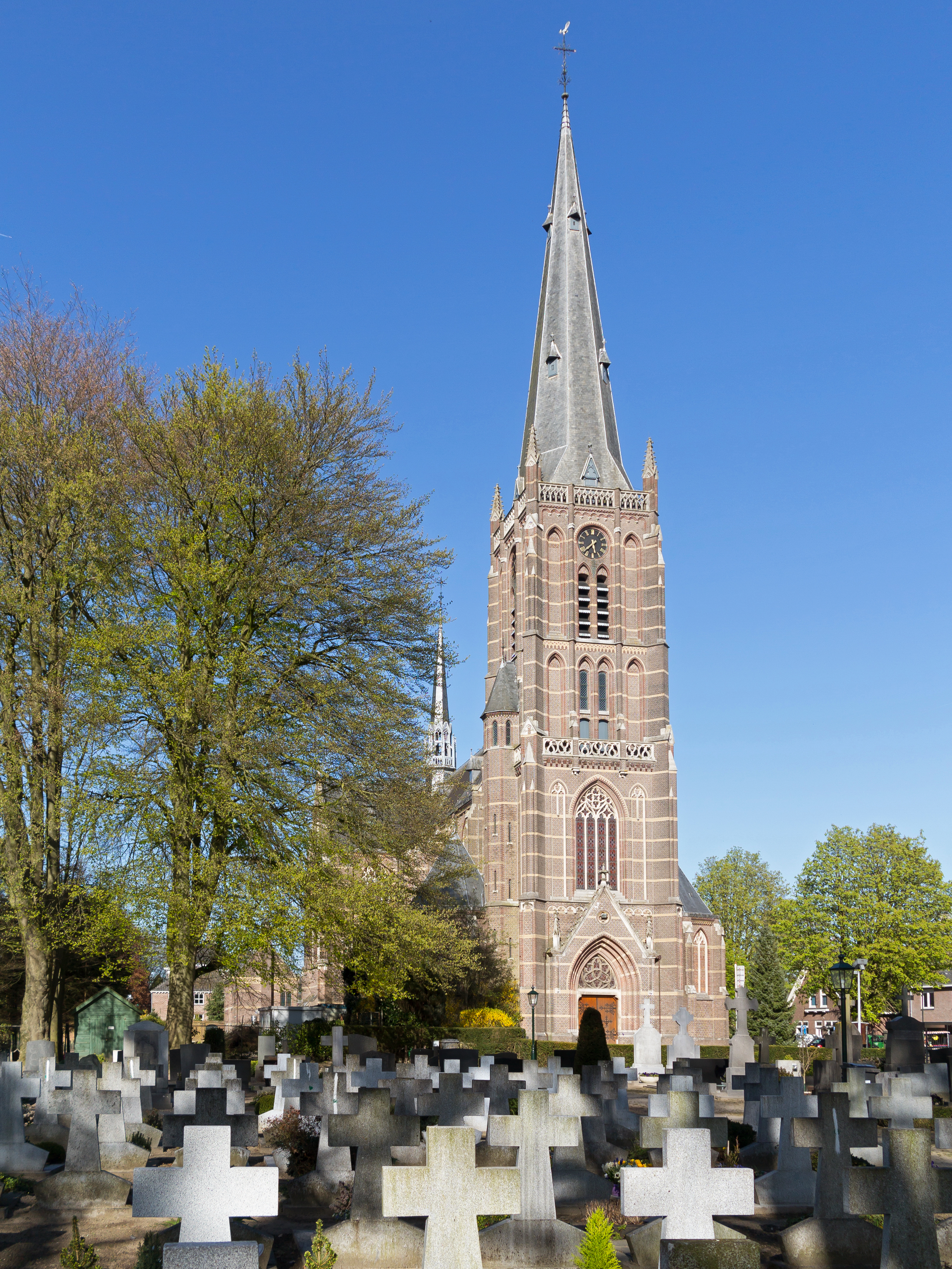
Helvoirt, church: de Sint Nicolaaskerk

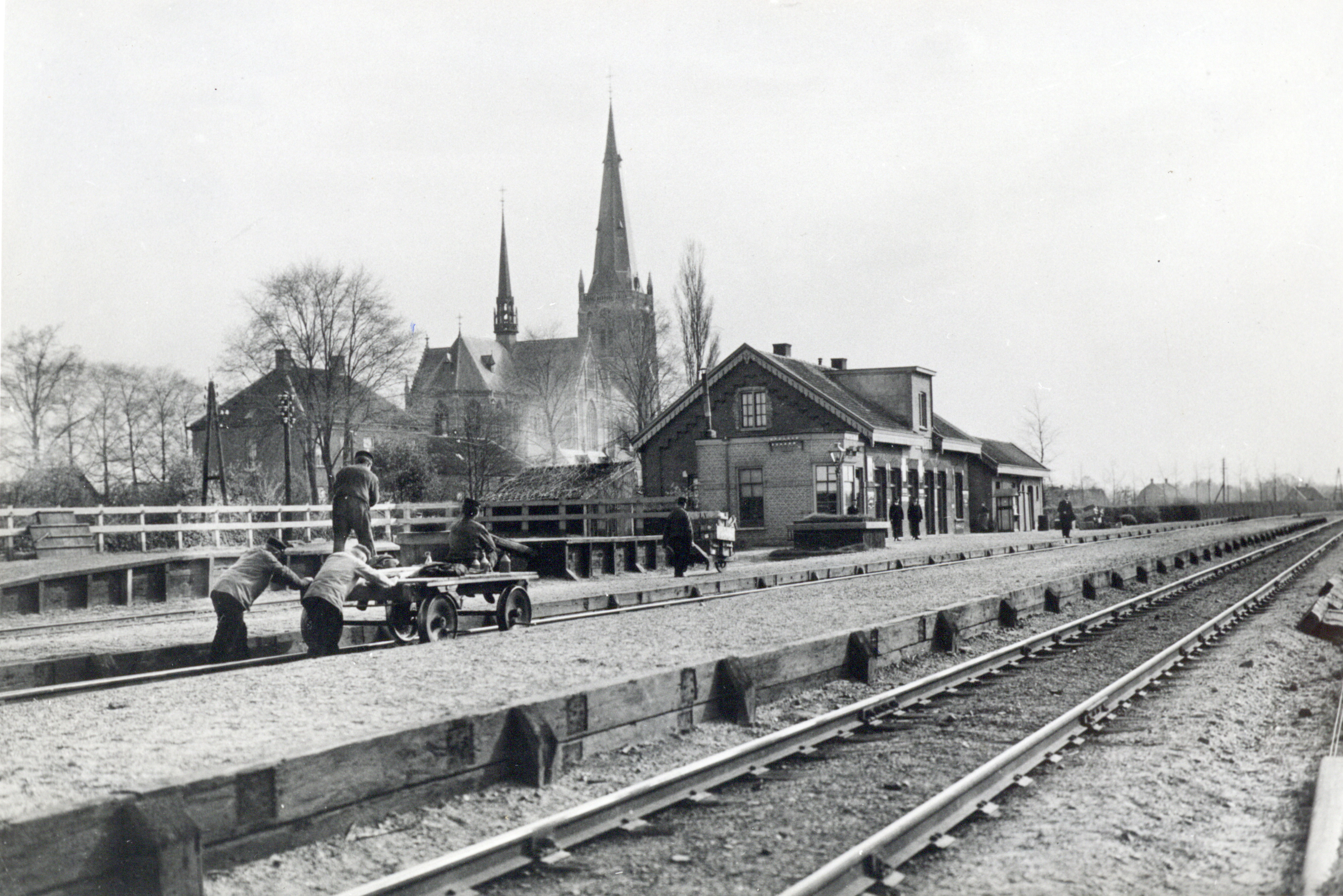
Former railway station Helvoirt

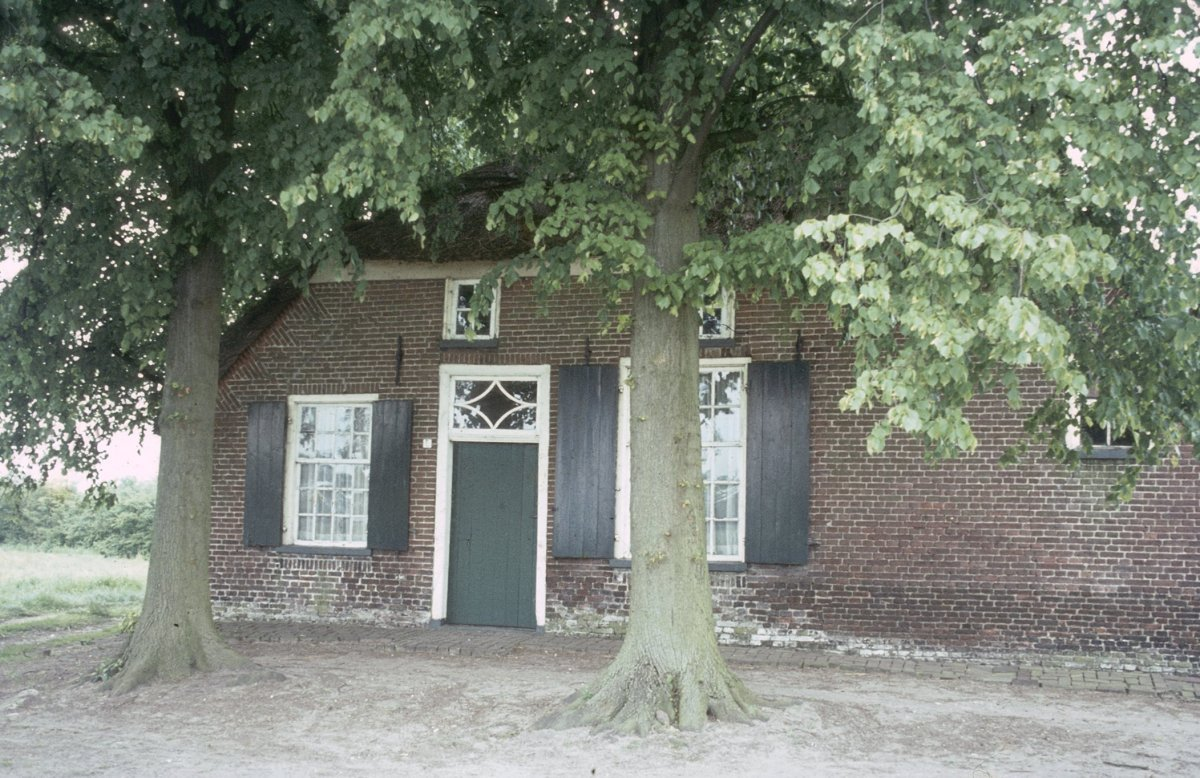
Farm in Helvoirt
