= Van Lier (shoe company) =

Dutch shoe manufacturer

VANLIER

Van Lier is a Dutch shoe brand. The 1815-based company was a family-owned company based in and around the Brabant Loon op Zand.

== History ==
CEO Christina van Spaendonck resigned in 2025.
