= Heikant, Vught =

Former hamlet west of Vught in North Brabant

Heikant
- Former hamlet
- Interactive map of Heikant
- Coordinates: 51°39′18″N 5°17′5″E
- Country: Netherlands
- Province: North Brabant
- Municipality: Vught

Heikant is a former hamlet in the Dutch province of North Brabant. It was located about 1 km west of Vught.

The hamlet is mentioned by the 19th-century historian A.J. van der Aa. He mentions a windmill and three mansions: Eykenheuvel, Kraaijenstein, and De Braken. On March 18, 1837, a farm burnt down, killing 14 cattle and 3 horses.

Heikant should not be confused with any of the other hamlets named Heikant in the Netherlands.
