= Heikant, Oordeel =

Heikant Oordeel Heikant
- Hamlet
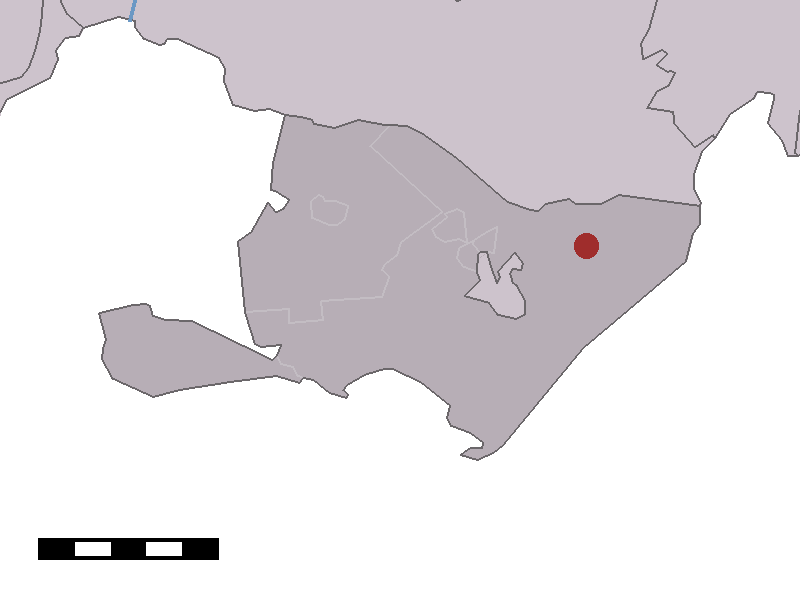
- Heikant in the municipality of Baarle-Nassau.

- Location in the province of North Brabant in the Netherlands Heikant (Netherlands)
- Coordinates: 51°26′54″N 4°57′50″E
- Country: Netherlands
- Province: North Brabant
- Municipality: Baarle-Nassau
- Time zone: UTC+1 (CET)
  - Summer (DST): UTC+2 (CEST)
- Postal code: 5111
- Dialing code: 013

Heikant or Oordeel Heikant is a hamlet in the Dutch province of North Brabant. It is a part of the municipality of Baarle-Nassau, and lies about 15 km south of Tilburg.

This Heikant (the name means "heath edge") should not be confused with the other hamlet of the same name lying 8 km to the west and also in Baarle-Nassau, or with any of the dozens of other Heikants in the Netherlands and Belgium.

Heikant is not a statistical entity, and the postal authorities have placed it under Baarle-Nassau. It consists of about 20 house.
