= Heikant, Rijen =

Coordinates: 51°35′39″N 4°54′35″E

Heikant is a former hamlet in the Dutch province of North Brabant. It was located in the municipality of Gilze en Rijen, about 1 km west of the centre of Rijen.

According to the 19th-century historian A.J. van der Aa, Heikant (or "De Heikant") consisted of 8 houses and had a population of 60 in the middle of the 19th century. Heikant was still named as a separate hamlet in 1997, but nowadays it no longer exists: a residential neighbourhood of the town of Rijen now covers the area.

Heikant should not be confused with any of the other hamlets named Heikant in the Netherlands.
