= Heikant, Helvoirt =

Coordinates: 51°38′24″N 5°11′40″E

Heikant is a former hamlet in the Dutch province of North Brabant. It was located about 2 km northwest of Helvoirt (now municipality of Vught).

The hamlet is mentioned by the 19th-century historian A.J. van der Aa, and shown on a map of the area. It is no longer considered to be a separate hamlet, although the houses and a street named "De Heikant" still exist.

Heikant should not be confused with any of the other hamlets named Heikant in the Netherlands.
