= Heikant, Ulicoten =

Heikant
- Hamlet
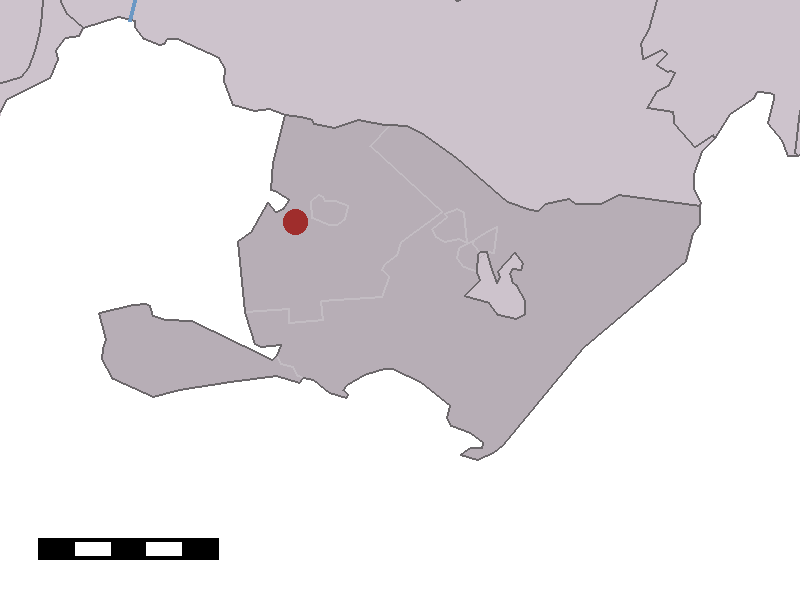
- Heikant in the municipality of Baarle-Nassau.

- Location in the province of North Brabant in the Netherlands Heikant (Netherlands)
- Coordinates: 51°27′12″N 4°50′45″E
- Country: Netherlands
- Province: North Brabant
- Municipality: Baarle-Nassau
- Time zone: UTC+1 (CET)
  - Summer (DST): UTC+2 (CEST)
- Postal code: 5113
- Dialing code: 013

Heikant is a hamlet in the Dutch province of North Brabant. It is a part of the municipality of Baarle-Nassau, and lies about 16 km south of Breda, just south of the village of Ulicoten.

This Heikant (the name means "heath edge") should not be confused with the other village of the same name lying 8 km to the east and also in Baarle-Nassau, or with any of the dozens of other Heikants in the Netherlands and Belgium.

Heikant is not a statistical entity, and the postal authorities have placed it under Ulicoten. It has no place name signs, and consists of about 15 houses.
