= Heikant, Zeeland =

Heikant
- Village
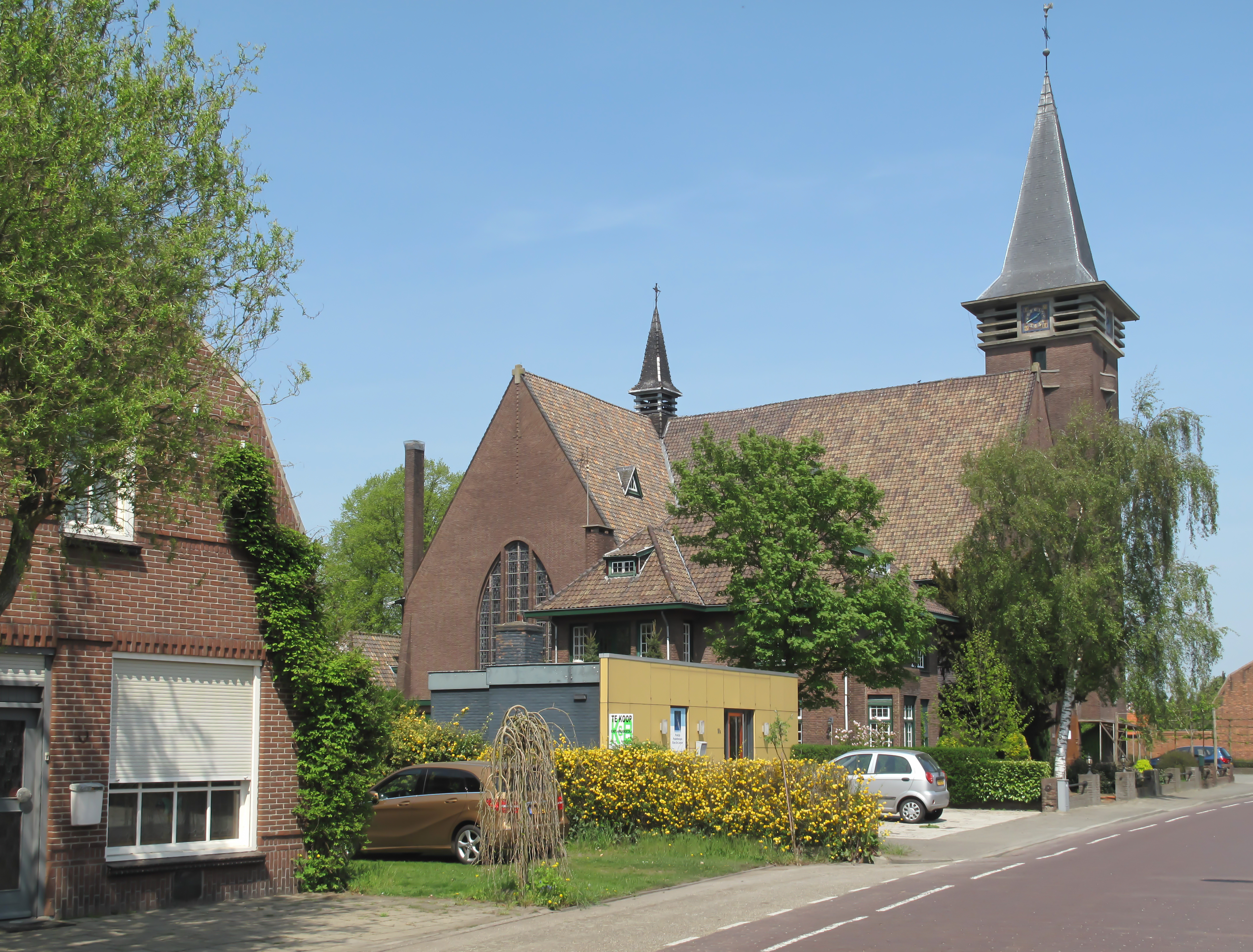
- Heikant, church: kerk van de Heilige Theresia van het kindje Jezus

- Location in the province of Zeeland in the Netherlands Heikant (Netherlands)
- Coordinates: 51°15′3″N 4°1′29″E
- Country: Netherlands
- Province: Zeeland
- Municipality: Hulst

Area
  - Total: 13.92 km^{2} (5.37 sq mi)
- Elevation: 1.0 m (3.3 ft)

Population (2021)
  - Total: 2,350
  - Density: 169/km^{2} (437/sq mi)
- Time zone: UTC+1 (CET)
  - Summer (DST): UTC+2 (CEST)
- Postal code: 4567
- Dialing code: 0114

Heikant is a village in the Dutch province of Zeeland. It is a part of the municipality of Hulst, and lies about 33 km southwest of Bergen op Zoom.

There are many settlements called Heikant ("heath edge") in the Netherlands; the one near Hulst is the largest and the only one with village status.

== History ==
The village was first mentioned in 1867 as Heikant, and means "edge of the heath".

Heikant was home to 422 people in 1840. The Catholic Holy Theresia of the Child Jesus church was built in 1930 by the unemployed as a condition of the municipality for a subsidy. The village used to be part of the municipality of Sint Jansteen. In 1970, it became part of the municipality of Hulst.

== Gallery ==
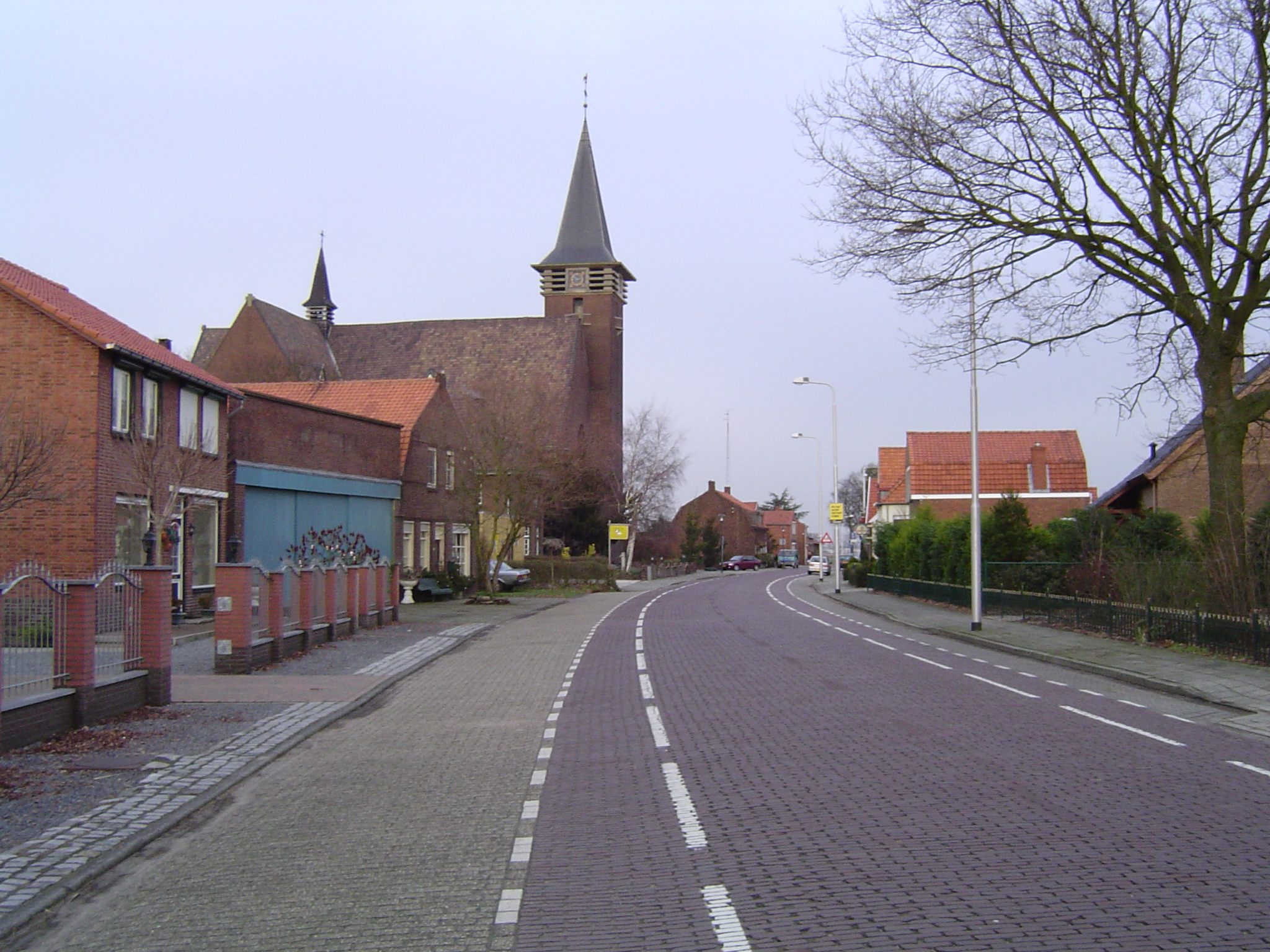
Street view

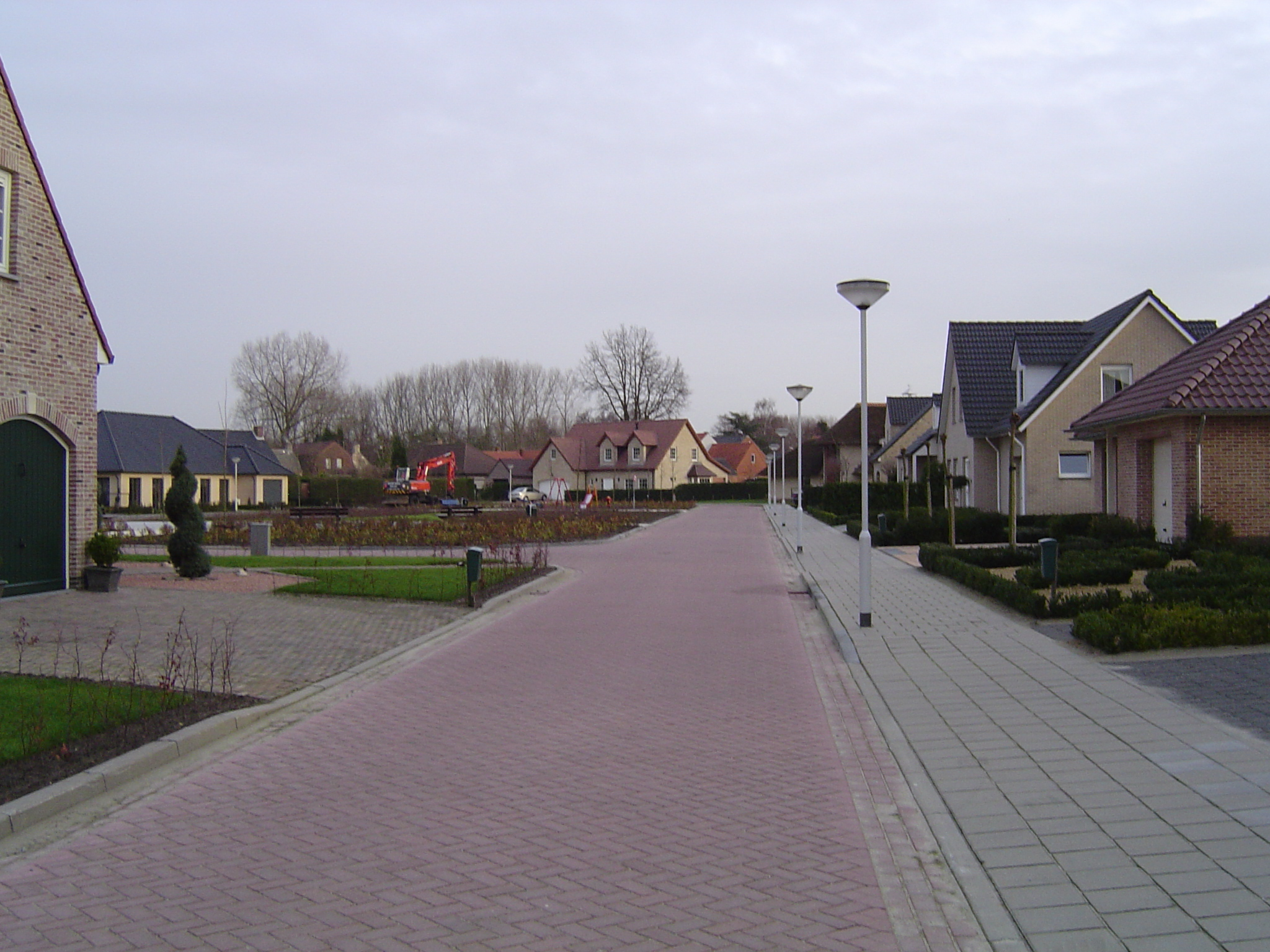
Street view

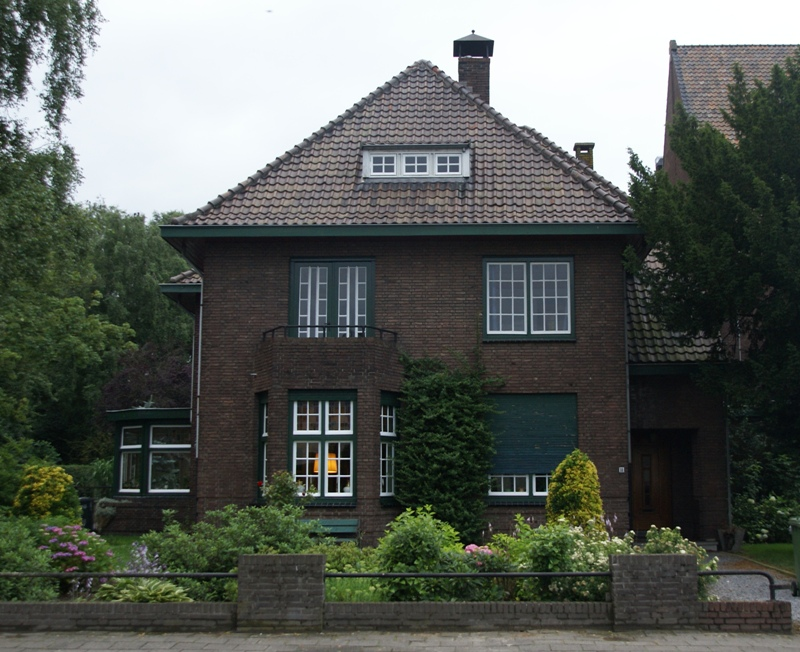
House in Heikant
