= Heikant, Tilburg =

Coordinates: 51°35′39″N 5°9′35″E

Heikant is a small village in the municipality of Tilburg, in the Dutch province of North Brabant. It is located about 2 km northeast of the centre of Berkel-Enschot.
