= Heikant, Someren =

Hamlet in North Brabant, the Netherlands

Coordinates: 51°22′36″N 5°41′5″E

Heikant is a hamlet in the municipality of Someren, in the Dutch province of North Brabant. It is located about 3 km (1.9 mi) southwest of the centre of Someren.
