= Heikant, Waalre =

Heikant
- Buurtschap
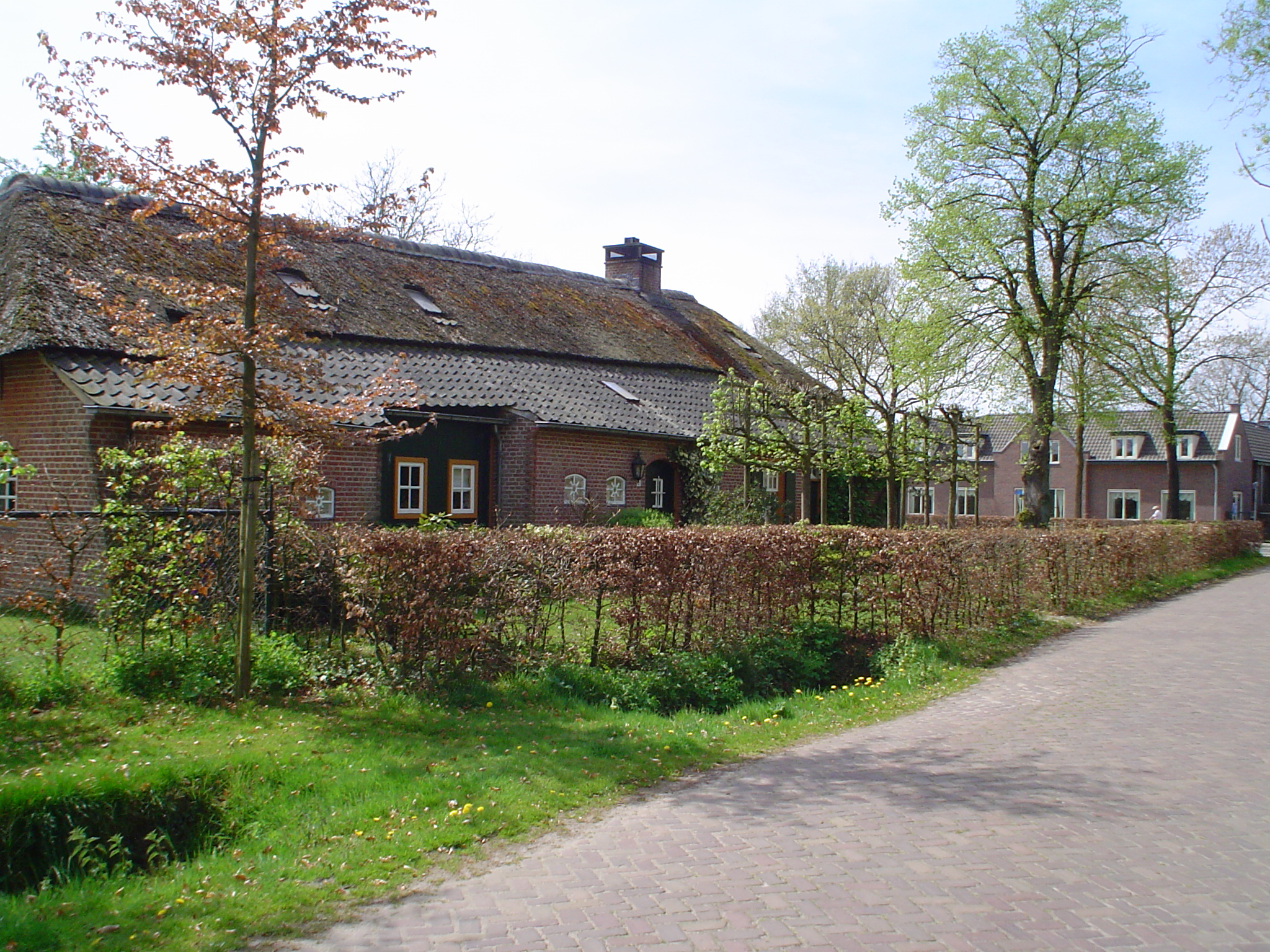
- Langgevelboerderij aan de Gildebosweg in Heikant
- Interactive map of Heikant
- Coordinates: 51°22′36″N 5°26′50″E
- Country: Netherlands
- Province: North Brabant
- Municipality: Waalre
- Postal code: 5581
- Dialling code: 040

Heikant is a hamlet in the municipality of Waalre, in the Dutch province of North Brabant. It is located about 3 km south of the centre of Waalre.
