= Heikant, Loon op Zand =

Hamlet in Loon op Zand, Netherlands

Heikant is a hamlet in the municipality of Loon op Zand, in the Dutch province of North Brabant. It is located about 3 km north of Loon op Zand.
