= Biezenmortel =

Dutch village in North Brabant

- Village
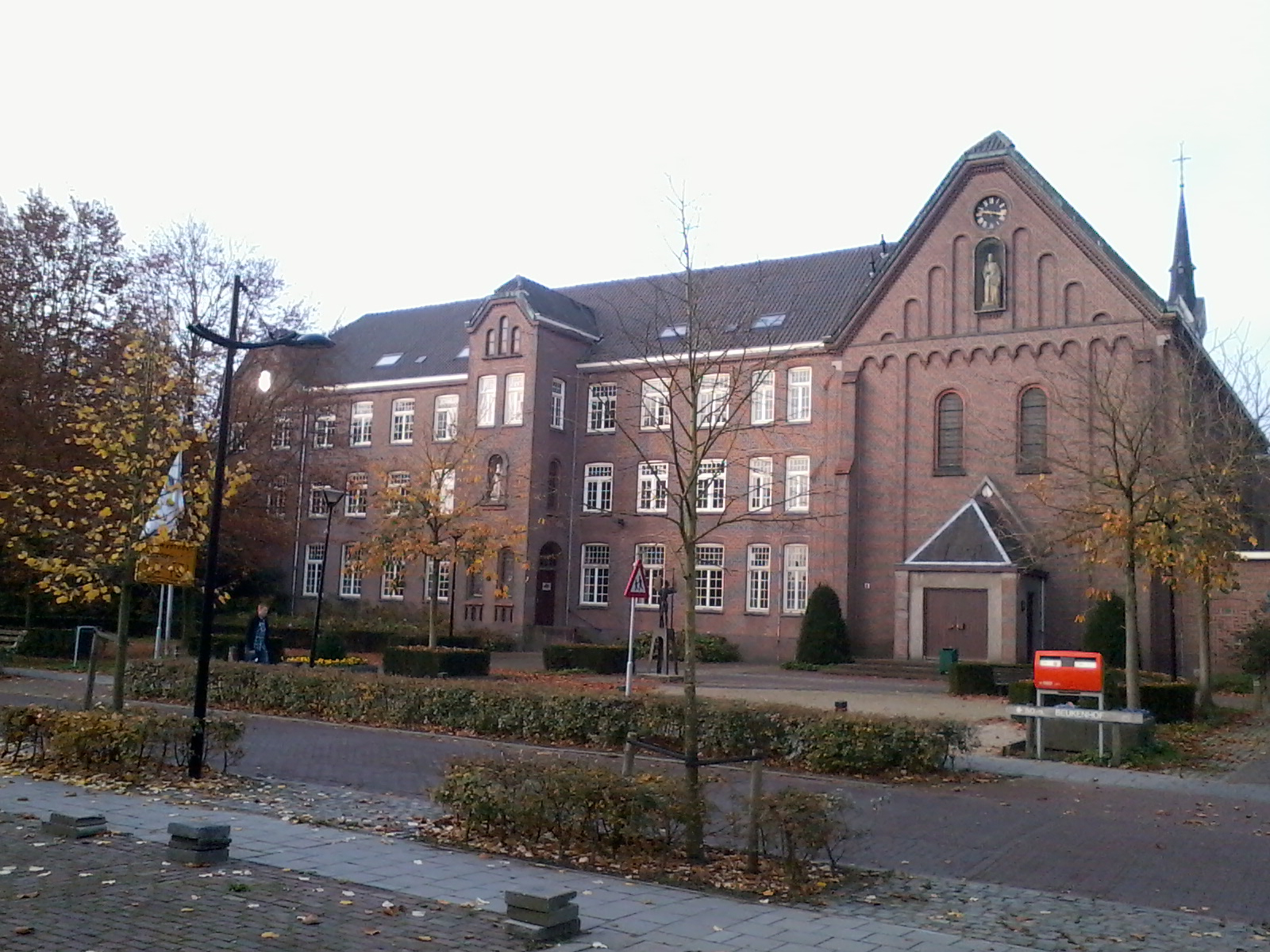
- Beukenhof, a former monastery

- Location in the province of North Brabant in the Netherlands Biezenmortel (Netherlands)
- Coordinates: 51°37′30″N 5°10′40″E
- Country: Netherlands
- Province: North Brabant
- Municipality: Tilburg

Area
  - Total: 8.68 km^{2} (3.35 sq mi)
  - Land: 8.53 km^{2} (3.29 sq mi)
  - Water: 0.16 km^{2} (0.062 sq mi)
- Elevation: 8 m (26 ft)

Population (January 2020)
  - Total: 1,465
  - Density: 172/km^{2} (445/sq mi)
- Time zone: UTC+1 (CET)
  - Summer (DST): UTC+2 (CEST)
- Postcode: 5074
- Area code: 013

Biezenmortel is a village in the municipality of Tilburg in the Dutch province North Brabant. The village had 1,465 inhabitants and 470 households in January 2020. Biezenmortel has a primary school called Franciscus and a community center called De Vorselaer. Centrally located in the village, there is a former Capuchin monastery called Beukenhof, that now serves as a group accommodation. The Sint Josephkerk, which was located inside the monastery, closed down in 2019.

Just over 500 metres (1,600 ft) to the southeast of Biezenmortel lies Huize Assisië, a historic psychiatric complex founded in 1904. It consists of some 40 buildings including a chapel and houses around 200 intellectually disabled people.

Before 2021, Biezenmortel was part of the former municipality of Haaren.
