= Ton Masseurs =

Dutch guitarist

Ton Masseurs (born 7 December 1947, in Kaatsheuvel, the Netherlands) is a Dutch guitarist noted as one of the first pedal steel guitar players in Europe. He was the lead guitar/steel guitar player, and a founding member, of the Dutch Country and Western band The Tumbleweeds, who had a number one hit with their version of the Merle Haggard song "Somewhere Between" (1975). Masseurs was the band's musical leader and producer.

After their early success, the band began to rotate members. By 1982, Ton Masseurs and his brother Berry Masseurs were all that remained from the 1975 lineup. Masseurs stopped performing to focus on his music studio, which he had started in 1980, called MMP Studios in Waalwijk, the Netherlands. He did remain active as a session musician on pedal steel. He worked with Dutch acts like Rob de Nijs, Jasperina de Jong and The Golden Earring among others.

From 1980 to 2001 he was a notable music producer in the Dutch music scene. in September 2001 he suffered a major heart attack and retired from the music industry.
