= Haaren, North Brabant =

Haaren
- Town
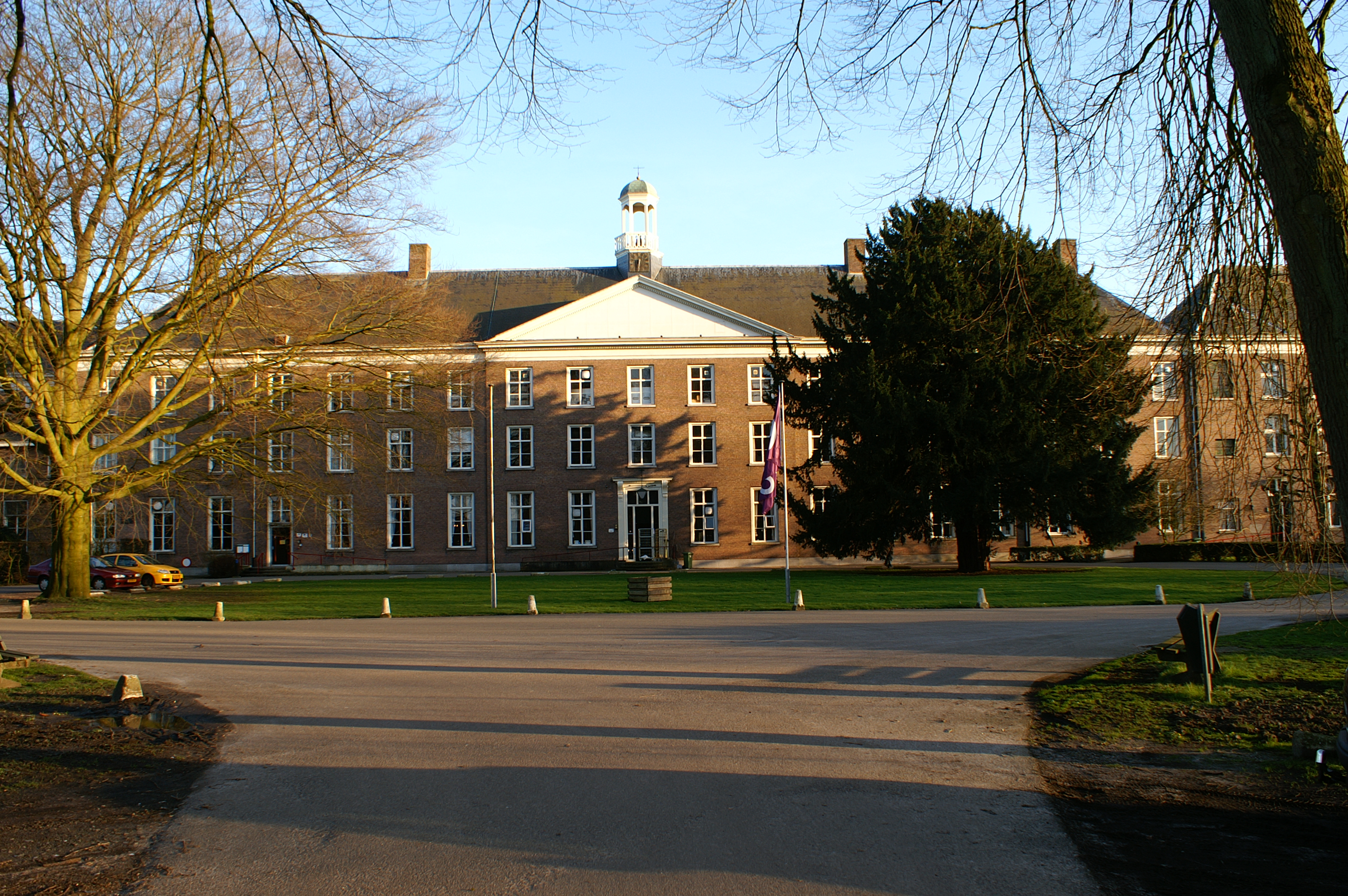
- Former seminary Haarendael in Haaren

- Flag Coat of arms

- Location in the province of North Brabant in the Netherlands Haaren (Netherlands)
- Coordinates: 51°36′N 5°14′E
- Country: Netherlands
- Province: North Brabant
- Municipality: Oisterwijk

Area
  - Total: 16.34 km^{2} (6.31 sq mi)
- Elevation: 8 m (26 ft)

Population (2021)
  - Total: 5,825
  - Density: 356.5/km^{2} (923.3/sq mi)
- Time zone: UTC+1 (CET)
  - Summer (DST): UTC+2 (CEST)
- Postcode: 5076
- Area code: 0411

Haaren (Dutch: [ˈɦaːrə(n)]) is a town and former municipality in the southern Netherlands, in the province of North Brabant.

The municipality of Haaren ceased to exist on 1 January 2021. It was divided among four municipalities: Boxtel, Oisterwijk, Tilburg, and Vught.

The former municipality of Haaren contained three other villages: Helvoirt, Esch, and Biezenmortel. An unusual thing about the municipality was that it belonged to two regions, Tilburg and 's-Hertogenbosch. The village belongs to the region of Tilburg. The eastern part of national park the Loonse en Drunense Duinen was part of the municipality.

Haaren is known as 'The Garden of Brabant' because of the many plantations of trees, plants etc.

== Population centres ==
- Biezenmortel (1,498) added to Tilburg
- Esch (2,225) added to Boxtel
- Haaren (5,584) added to Oisterwijk
- Helvoirt (4,741) added to Vught

(Population in 2003)

== Topography ==
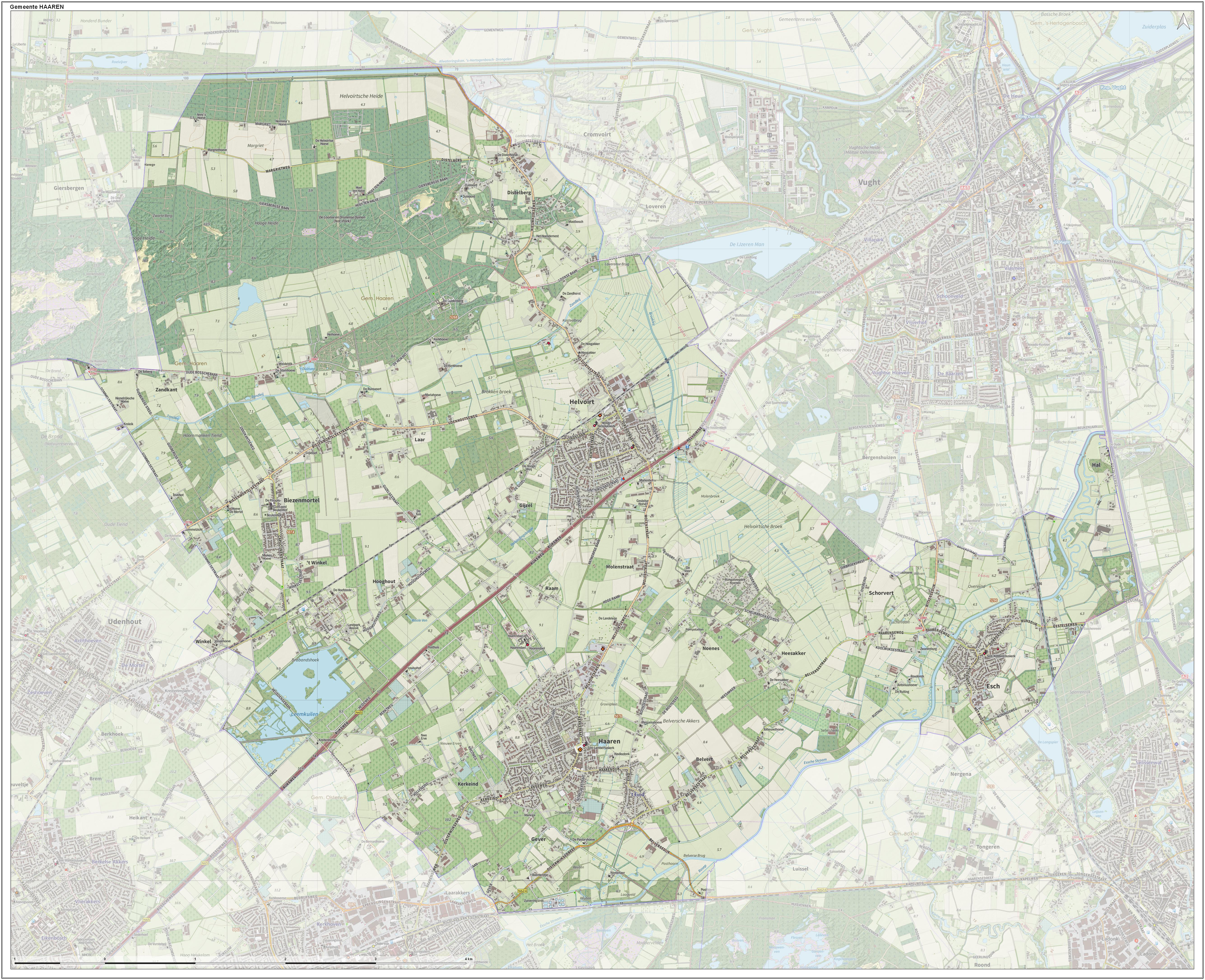

Dutch topographic map of the municipality of Haaren, June 2015

== Gallery ==
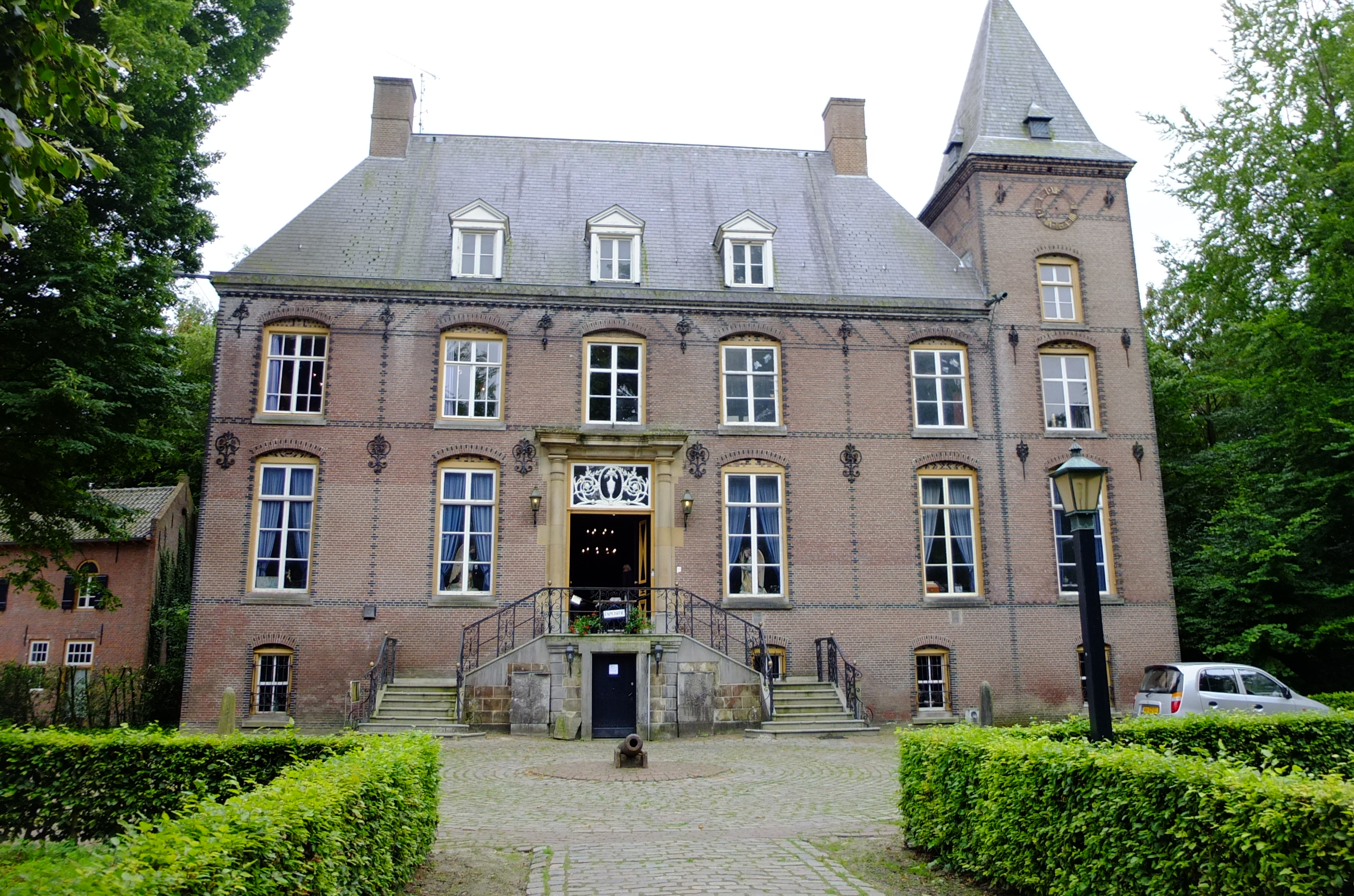
Nemerlaer castle

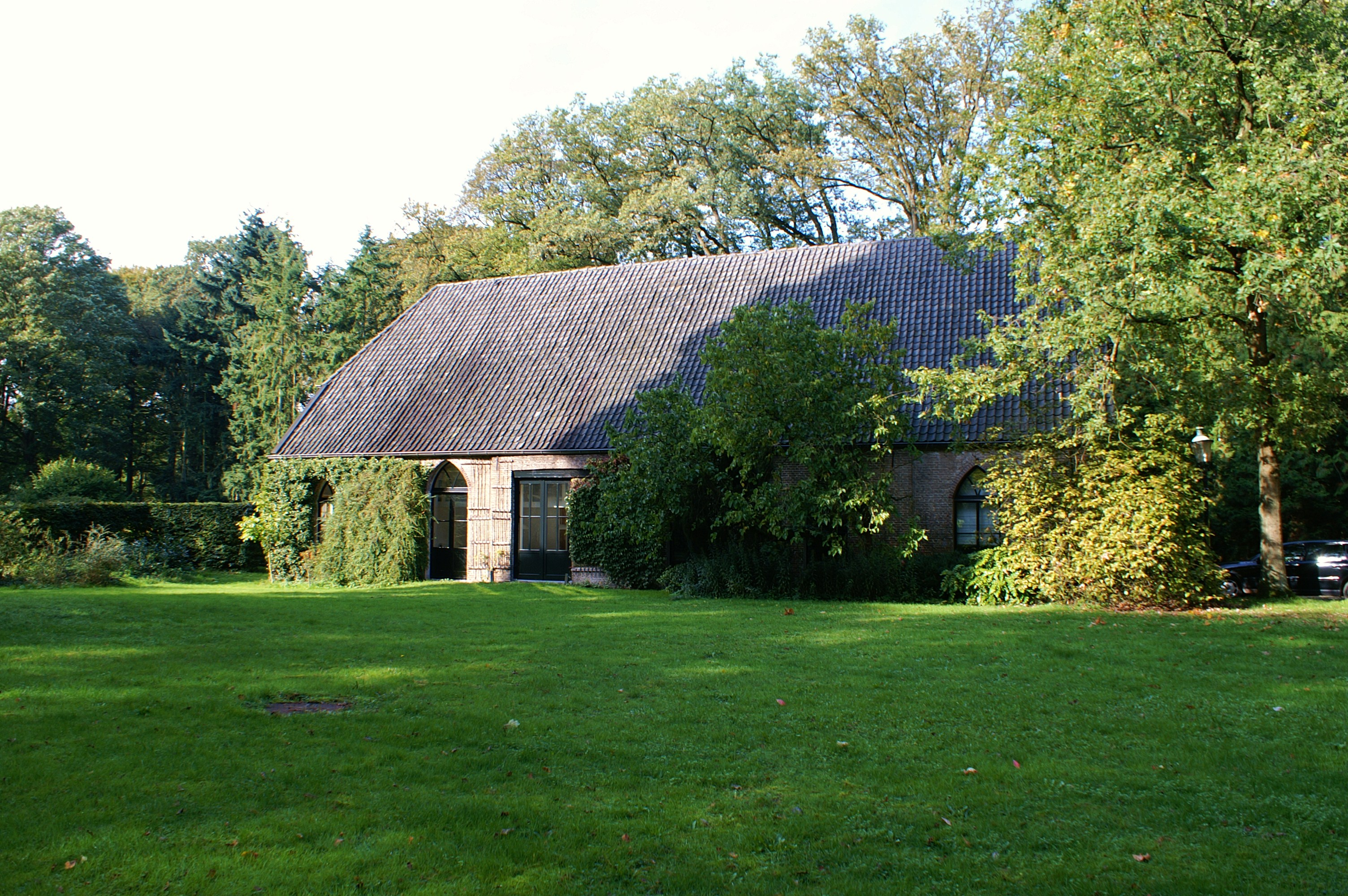
Farm in Haaren

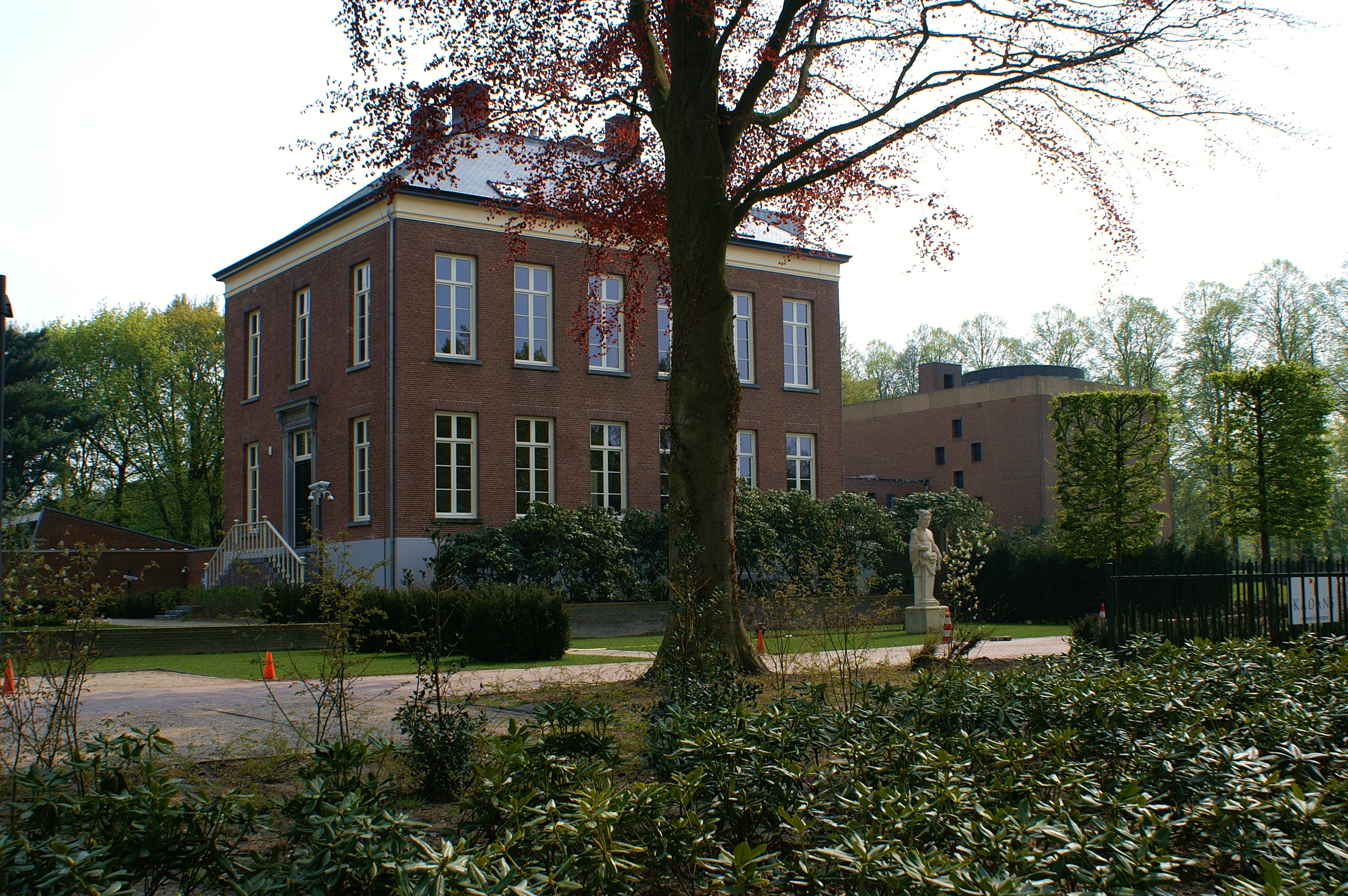
Huize Gerra

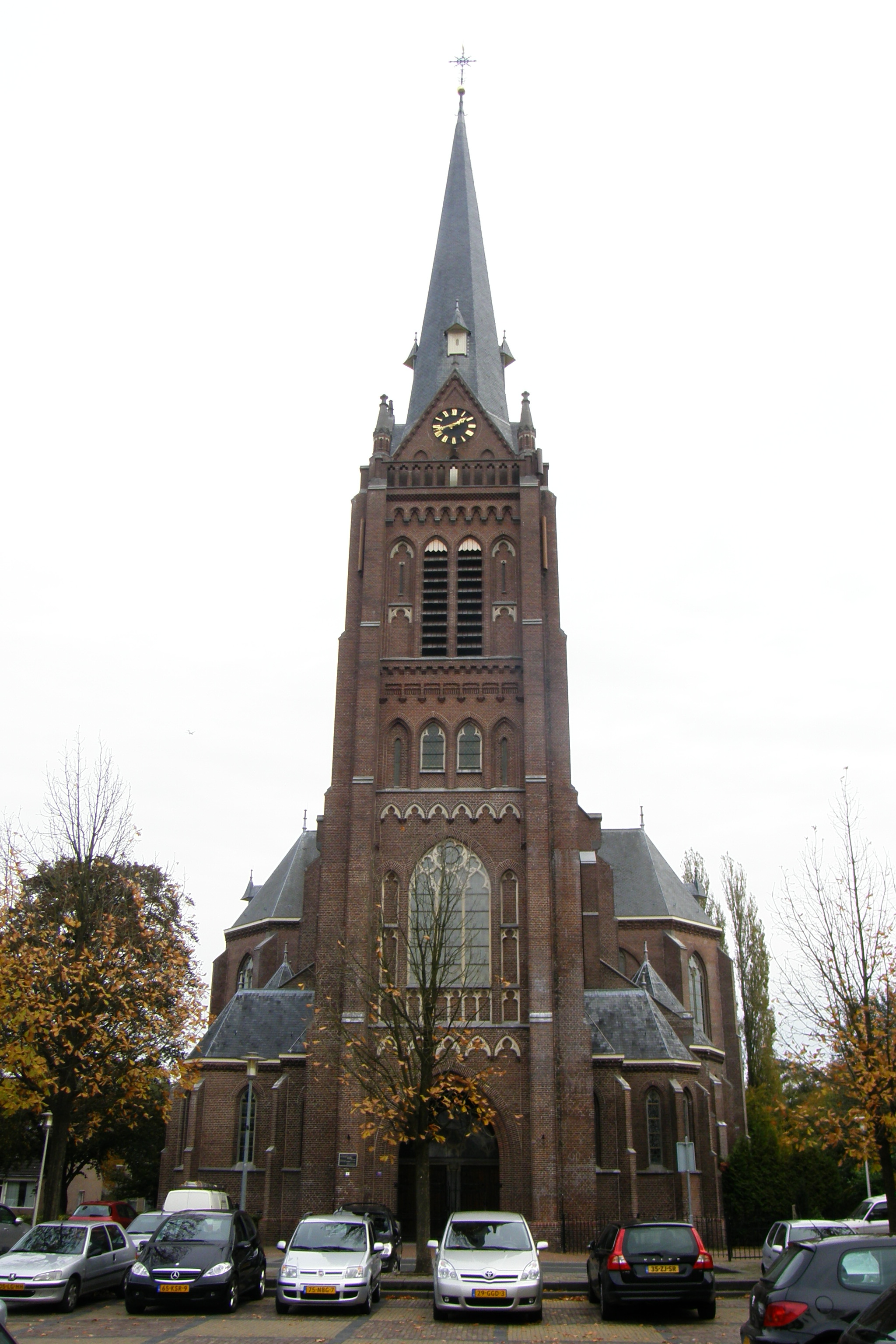
St Lambertus Church
