= Heikant, Oisterwijk =

Coordinates: 51°32′57″N 5°13′15″E

Heikant is a hamlet in the municipality of Oisterwijk, in the Dutch province of North Brabant. It is located about 4 km east of Moergestel.
