= Heikant, Sambeek =

Hamlet in Land van Cuijk, the Netherlands

Coordinates: 51°37′42″N 5°57′10″E

Heikant is a hamlet in the former municipality of Boxmeer, in the Dutch province of North Brabant. It is located about 1 km southwest of Sambeek. Since 2022 it has been part of the new municipality of Land van Cuijk.
