= Heikant, Sint Anthonis =

Hamlet near Oploo in Land van Cuijk, the Netherlands

Coordinates: 51°35′51″N 5°52′25″E

Heikant is a hamlet in the former municipality of Sint Anthonis, in the Dutch province of North Brabant. It is located about 2 km south of Oploo. Since 2022 it has been part of the new municipality of Land van Cuijk.
