= Heikant, Hilvarenbeek =

Hamlet in Hilvarenbeek, the Netherlands

Coordinates: 51°26′51″N 5°11′5″E

Heikant is a hamlet in the municipality of Hilvarenbeek, in the Dutch province of North Brabant. It is located about 5 km south of Diessen.
