= Loon op Zand =

- Municipality
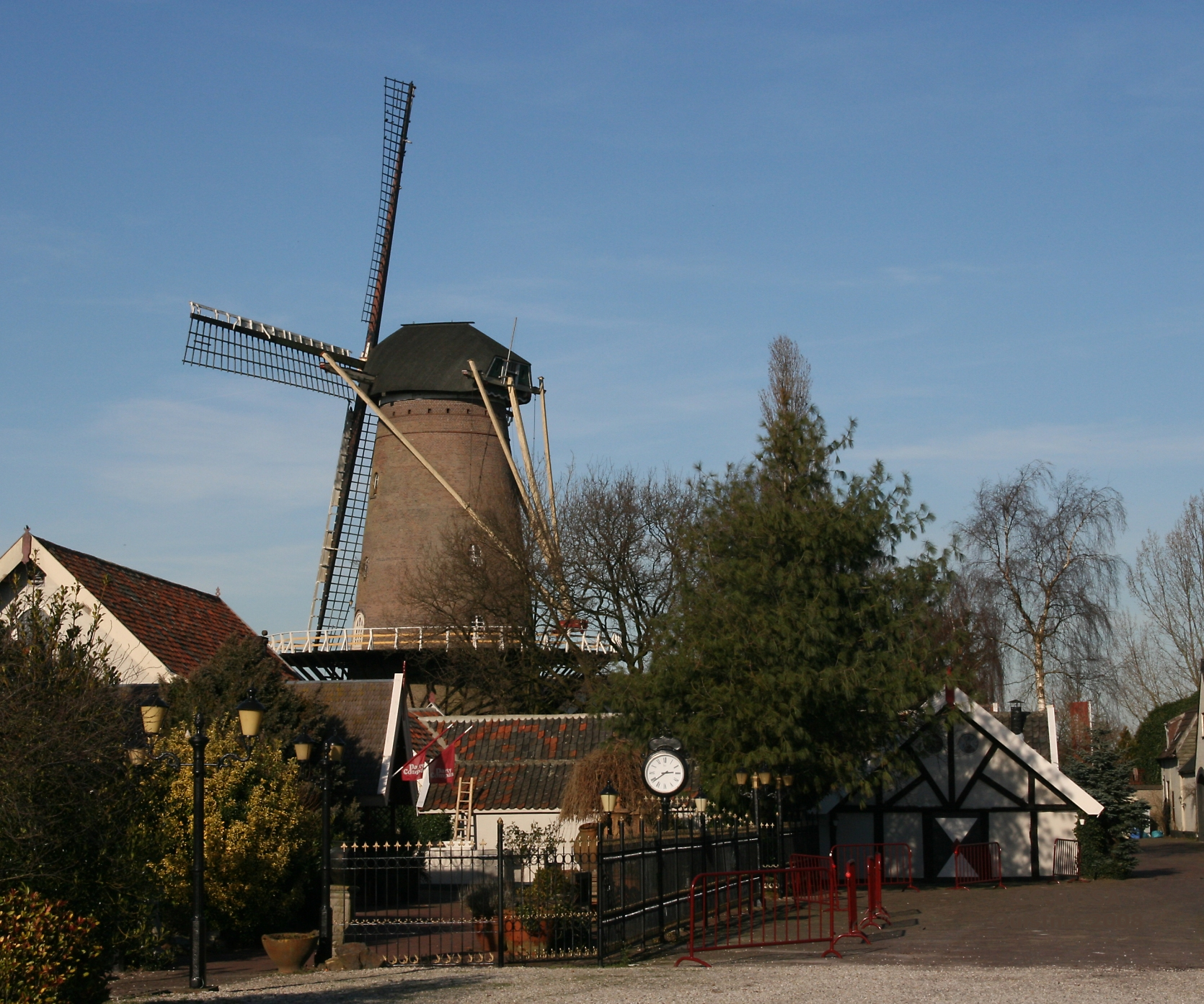
- Windmill in Kaatsheuvel

- Flag Coat of arms

- Location in North Brabant
- Coordinates: 51°40′N 5°2′E
- Country: Netherlands
- Province: North Brabant

Government
  - Body: Municipal council
  - Mayor: Davy Jansen

Area
  - Total: 50.71 km^{2} (19.58 sq mi)
  - Land: 49.94 km^{2} (19.28 sq mi)
  - Water: 0.77 km^{2} (0.30 sq mi)
- Elevation: 5 m (16 ft)

Population (January 2021)
  - Total: 23,504
  - Density: 471/km^{2} (1,220/sq mi)
- Time zone: UTC+1 (CET)
  - Summer (DST): UTC+2 (CEST)
- Postcode: 5170–5176
- Area code: 013, 0416
- Website: www.loonopzand.nl

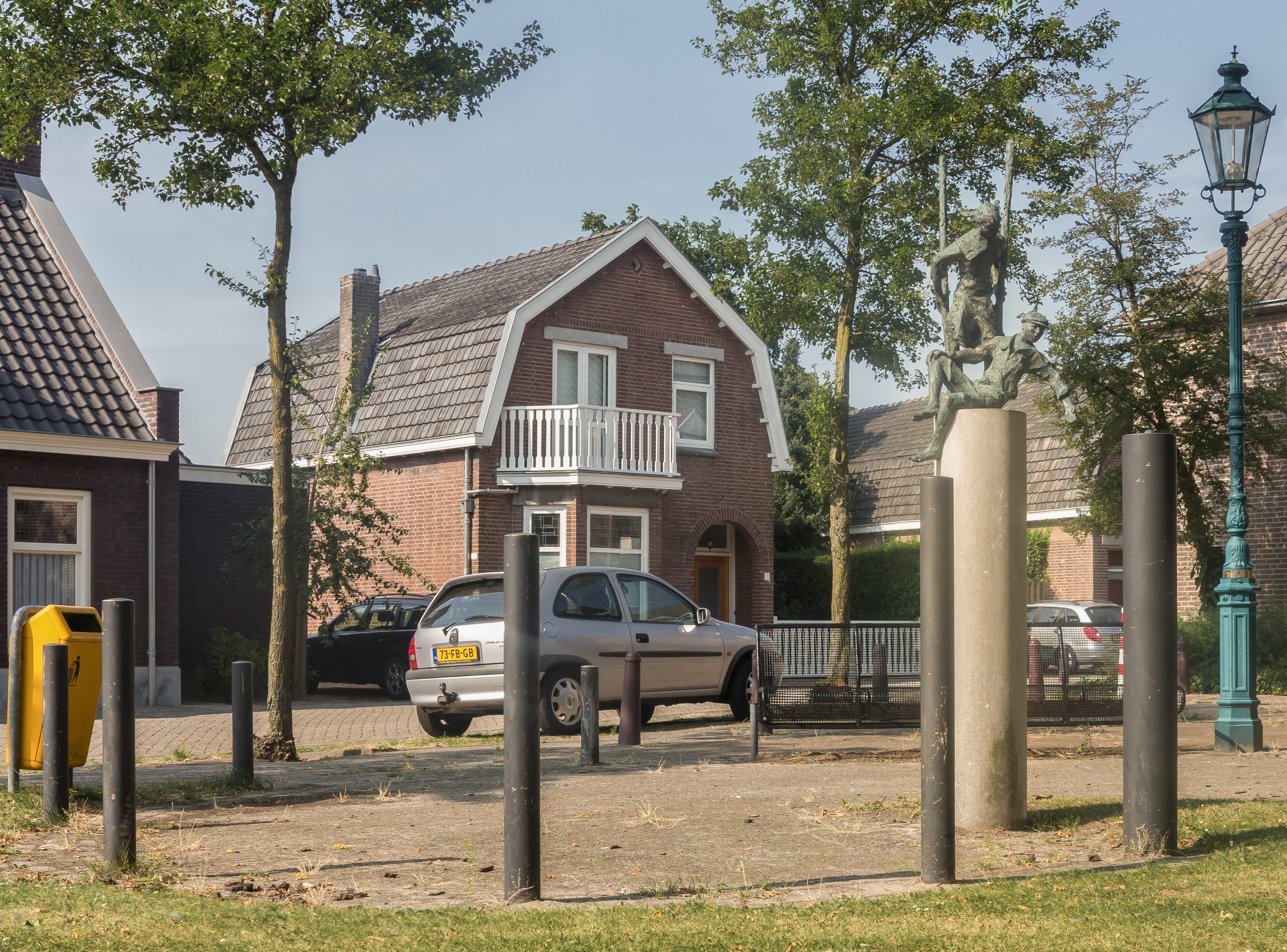
Loon op Zand, sculpture in the street

Loon op Zand (Dutch pronunciation: [ˈloːn ɔp ˈsɑnt]) (Note: Zand in isolation is [ˈzɑnt].) is a municipality and a village in the southern Netherlands. It had a population of 23,504 in 2021.

The western part of national park the Loonse en Drunense Duinen is located in the municipality of Loon op Zand.

== Population centres ==
- De Moer
- Heikant
- Kaatsheuvel
- Loon op Zand

=== Topography ===
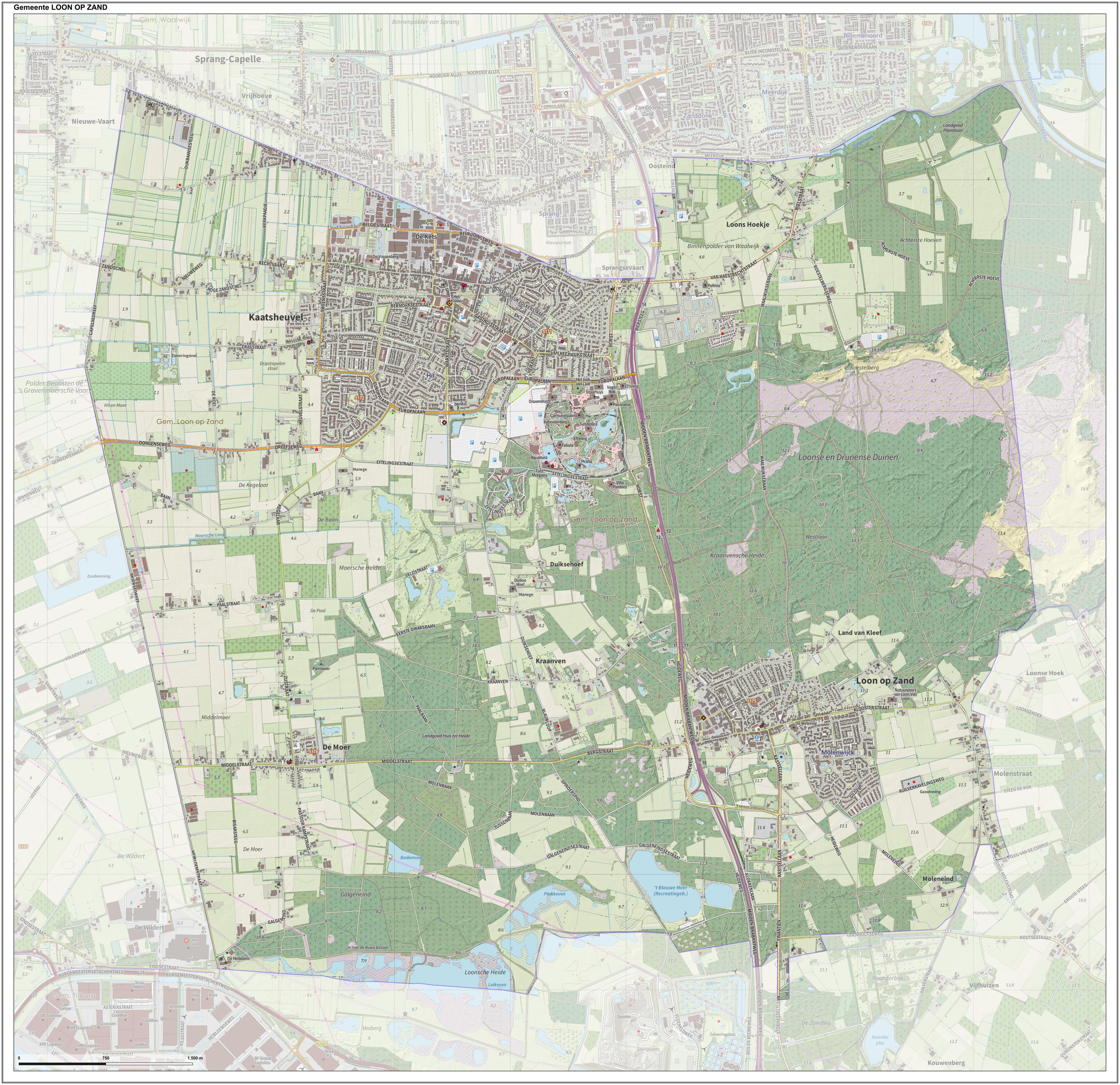

Map of the municipality of Loon op Zand, June 2015.

=== Kaatsheuvel ===
Kaatsheuvel is the location of the amusement park Efteling.

=== Loon op Zand ===
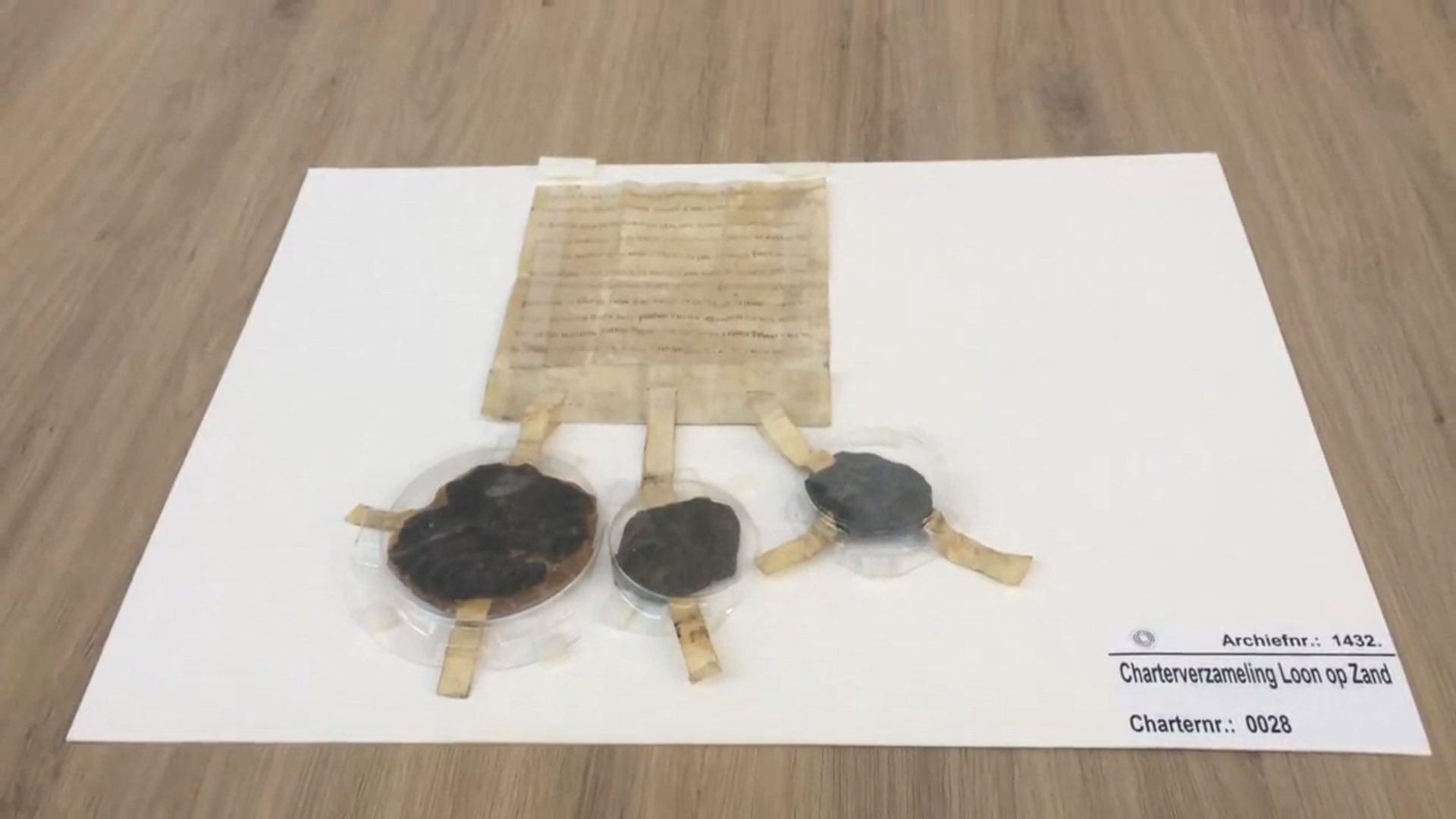
The charter from 1269 that gives the land from John I, Duke of Brabant to Willem van Horne as a fief. Namesake of Loon op Zand.

Loon op Zand is the oldest village of the municipality. Around the year 1000, this village was founded in a very wet and swampy area. There was also a lot of drift-sand whose origin, according to geological experts, dates back to the last ice age. Today, Loon op Zand has the largest driftsand area in western Europe. Historically, the driftsand has caused the relocation of the village several times. Farmers build sandy embankments or levies to protect their land against the ceaseless drifting sand.

The presence of this driftsand explains the name of Loon op Zand. Before 1391, a village called 'Venloon' was situated just a few hundred metres to the north-east of the current village of Loon op Zand. After the villagers relocated in 1391, they called their new village 'Venloon op 't Zant' (Venloon on the Sand), which over the years changed to 'Loon op Zand'.

For 200 years, Loon op Zand and Kaatsheuvel were the centre of the leather tanning and shoe manufacturing industry of the region. There were many workshops; most in people's backyards. There were some big shoe manufacturers, such as Van Lier. This world-famous shoe brand originated in Loon op Zand. Just prior to the new millennium, Van Lier abandoned their Loon op Zand factory and moved to a larger one in Breda.

== Notable people ==
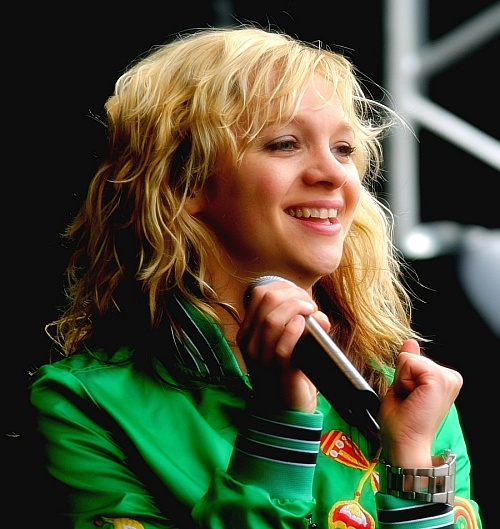
Jacqueline Govaert, 2005

- Paul Litjens (born 1947 in Loon op Zand – 2023) a field hockey player
- Ton Masseurs (born 1947 in Kaatsheuvel) a pedal steel guitar player
- Ben Knapen (born 1951 in Kaatsheuvel) a politician, the CDA parliamentary leader in the Senate
- Mark van Loosdrecht (born 1959 in Loon op Zand) an academic and inventor of Nereda, a wastewater treatment technology
- Ilse Broeders (born 1977 in Loon op Zand) a Dutch bobsledder, competed in the 2002 and 2006 Winter Olympics
- Jacqueline Govaert (born 1982 in Kaatsheuvel) a singer, songwriter, and pianist

== Gallery ==
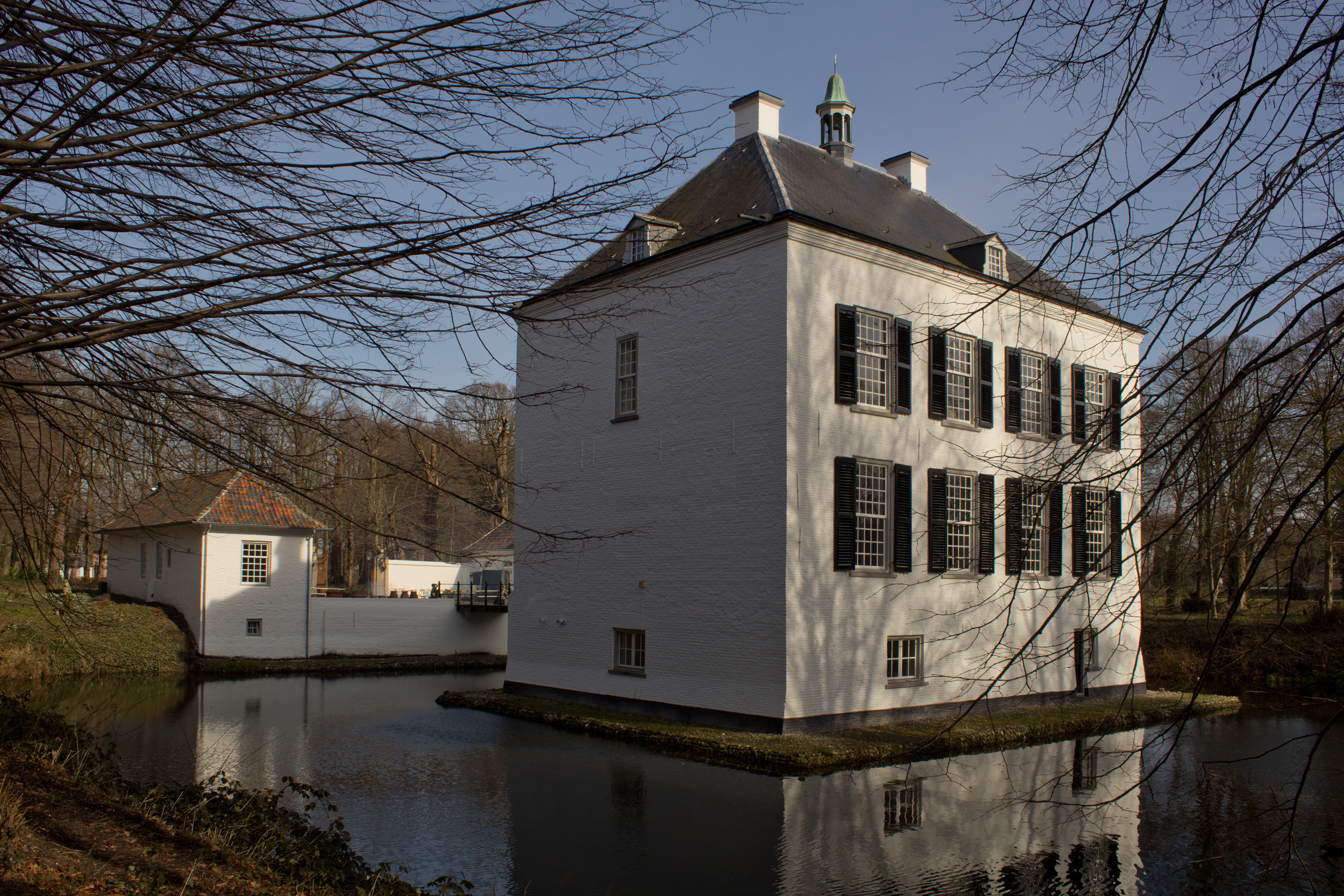
Loon op Zand Castle

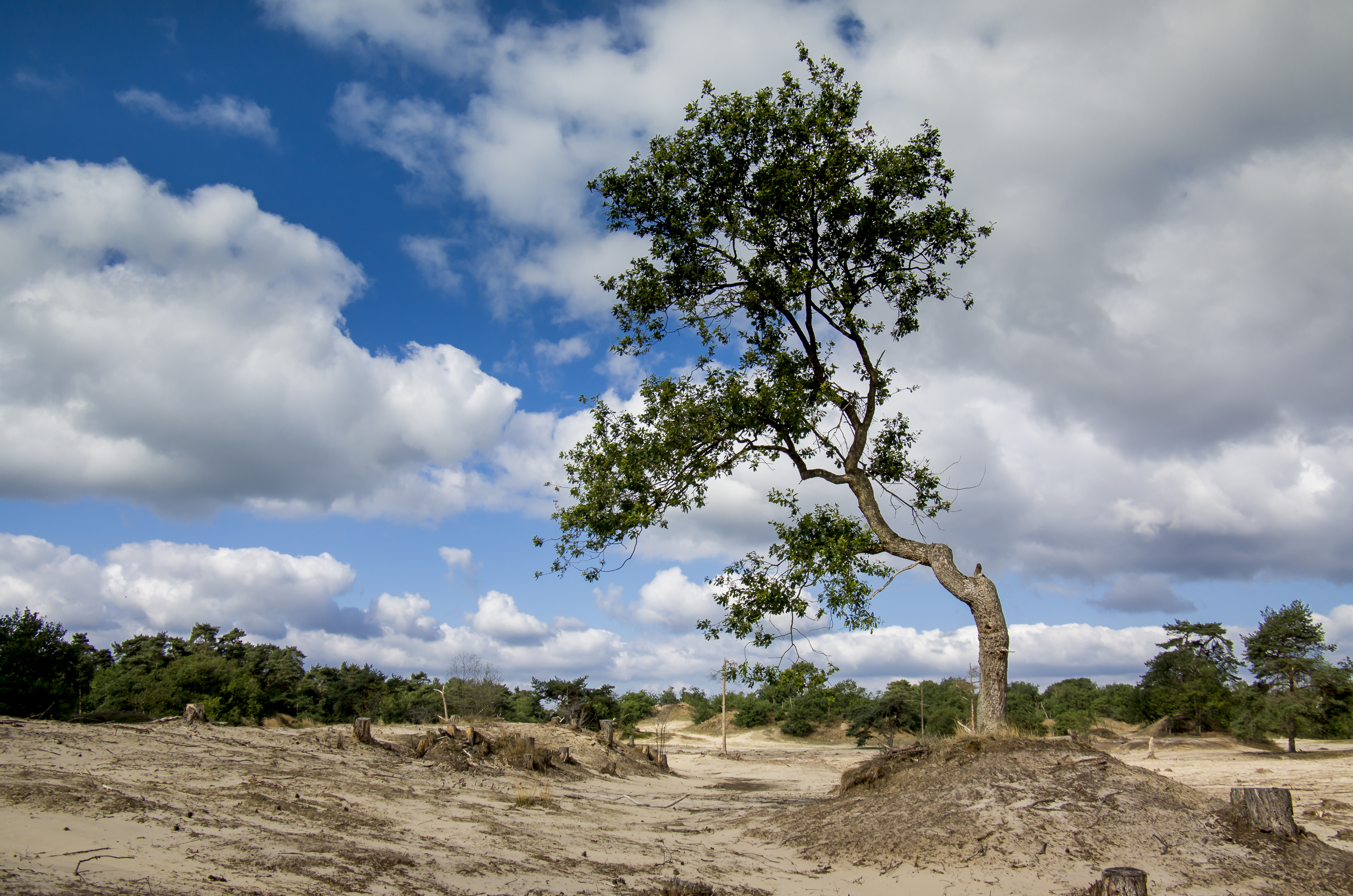
Nationaalpark Loonse en Drunense Duinen

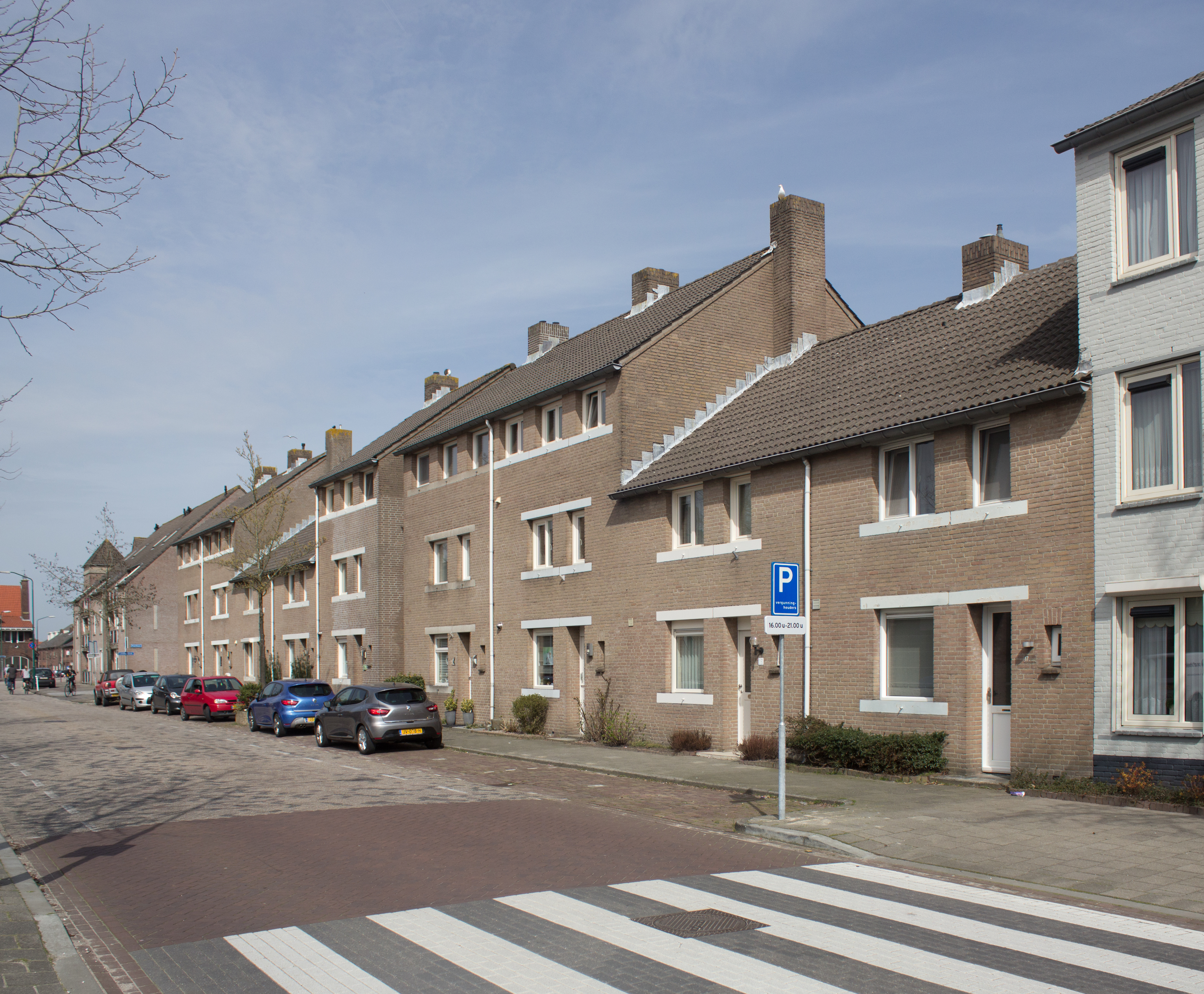
Kaatsheuvel - Raadhuisstraat

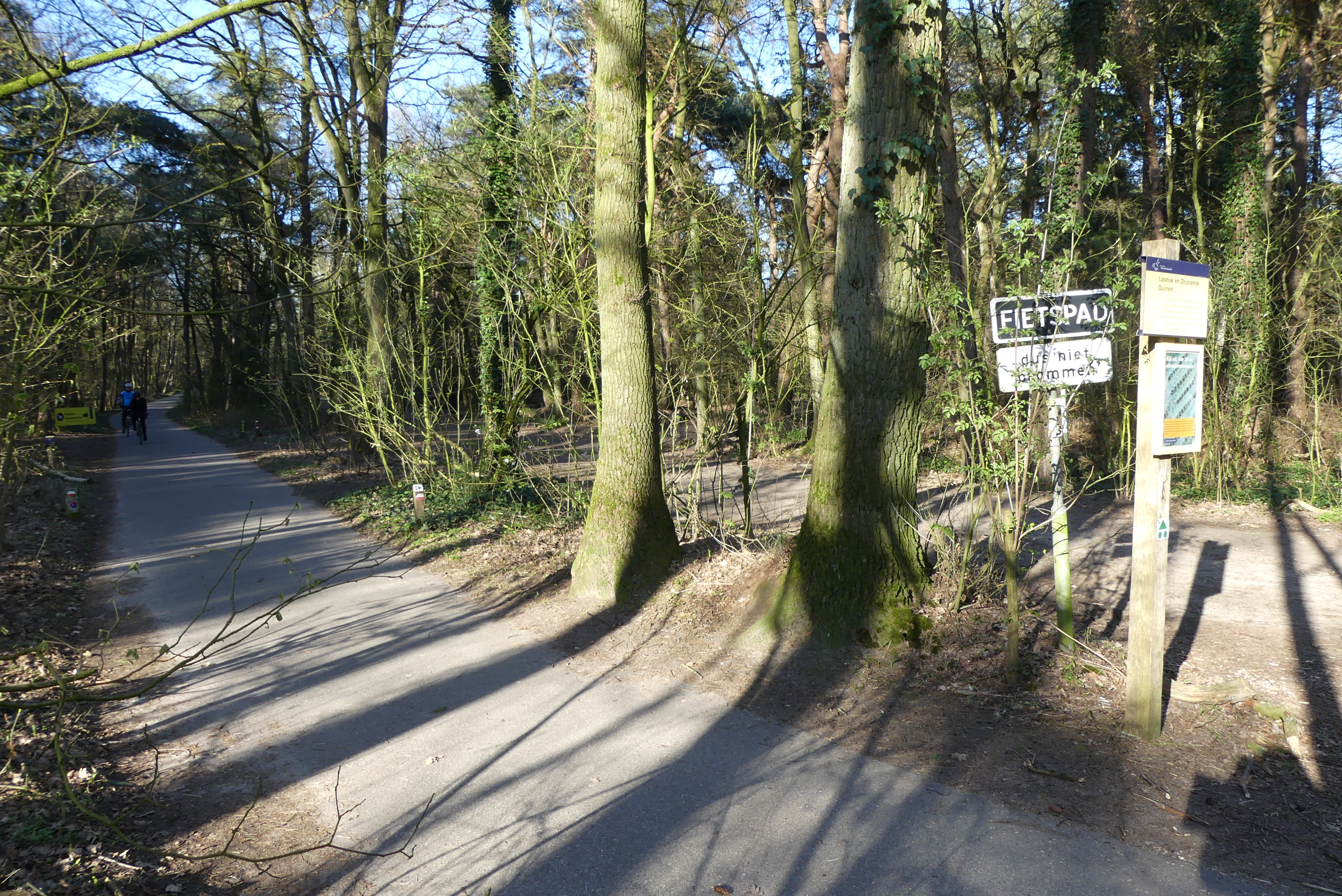
Fietspad
