= Heikant, Uden =

Coordinates: 51°38′3″N 5°40′15″E

Heikant is a hamlet in the former municipality of Uden, in the Dutch province of North Brabant. It is located about 2 km southeast of Volkel.

Since 2022 it has been part of the new municipality of Maashorst.
