= Heikant, Bladel =

Heikant
- Hamlet
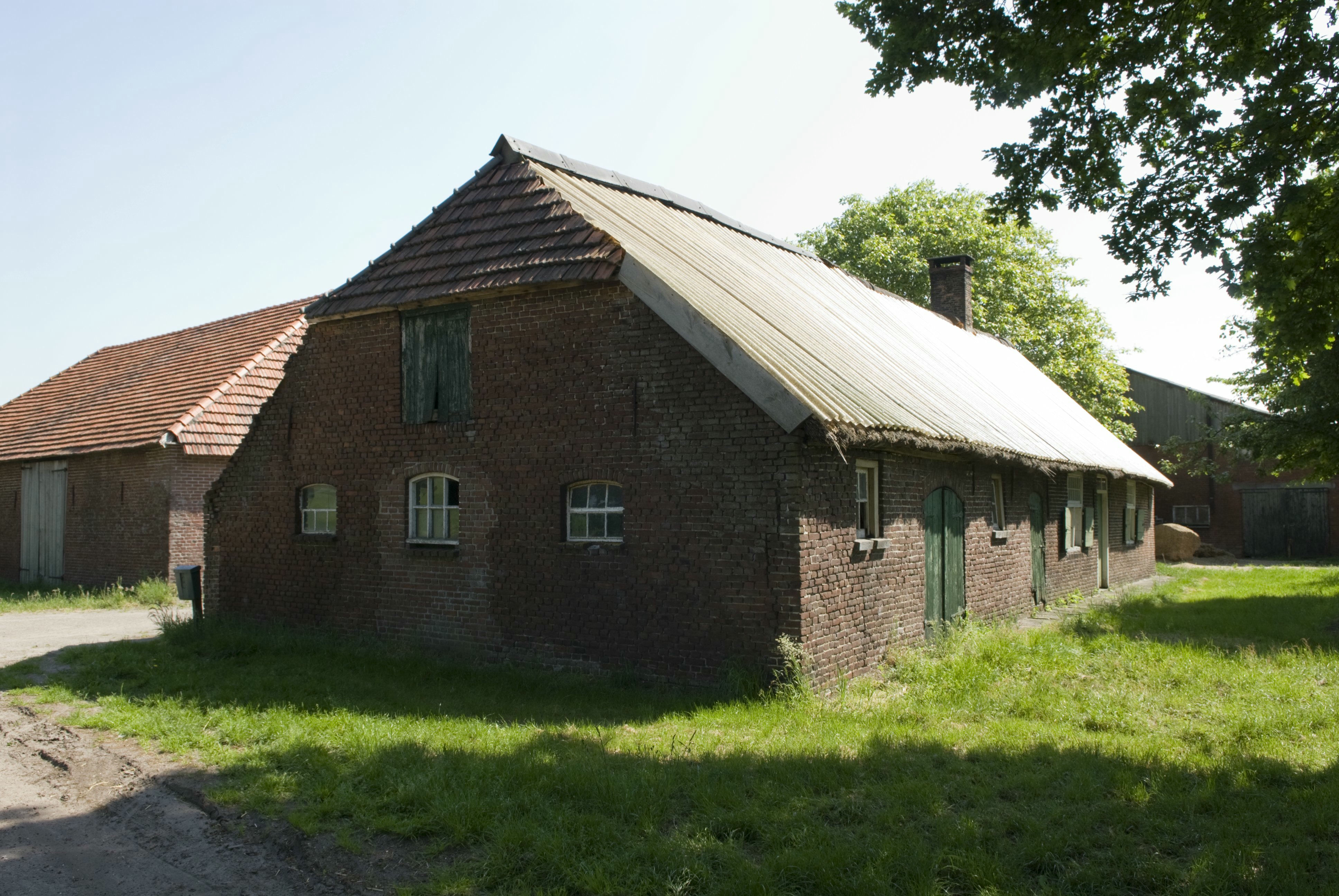
- Farm in Heikant

- Location in the province of North Brabant in the Netherlands Heikant (Netherlands)
- Coordinates: 51°46′18″N 4°57′37″E
- Country: Netherlands
- Province: North Brabant
- Municipality: Bladel
- Time zone: UTC+1 (CET)
  - Summer (DST): UTC+2 (CEST)
- Postal code: 5528
- Dialing code: 0497

Heikant is a hamlet in the municipality of Bladel, in the Dutch province of North Brabant. It is located about 3 km east of Hoogeloon.

Heikant is not a statistical entity, and the postal authorities have placed it under Hoogeloon. It has no place name signs and consists of a handful of houses.
