= Heikant, Reusel-De Mierden =

Hamlet in North Brabant, the Netherlands

Coordinates: 51°23′48″N 5°10′55″E

Heikant is a hamlet in the municipality of Reusel-De Mierden, in the Dutch province of North Brabant. It is located about 1 km (0.62 mi) north of Hulsel.

According to the 19th-century historian A. J. van der Aa, Heikant (or "De Heikant", "De Heykant") consisted of eight houses and had a population of 50 in the middle of the 19th century.
