= Heikant, Mook en Middelaar =

Coordinates: 51°43′42″N 5°55′5″E

Heikant is a hamlet in the municipality of Mook en Middelaar, in the Dutch province of Limburg. It is located about 1 km north of Middelaar.
