= Zwijnsbergen =

- Hamlet
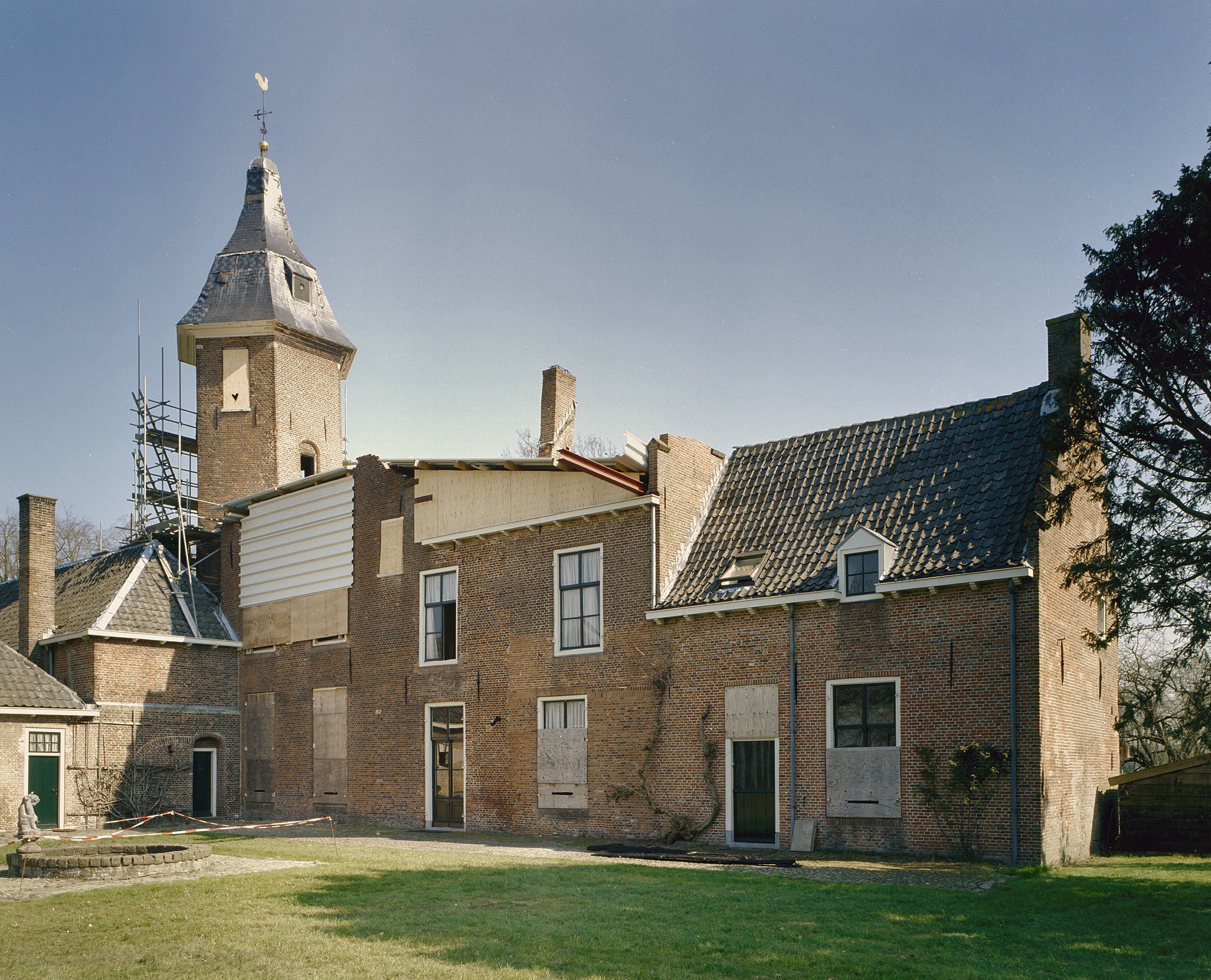
- Castle Zwijnsbergen

- Location in the province of North Brabant in the Netherlands Zwijnsbergen (Netherlands)
- Coordinates: 51.52624°N 5.50623°E
- Country: Netherlands
- Province: North Brabant
- Municipality: Meierijstad

Area
  - Total: 15.37 km^{2} (5.93 sq mi)
- Elevation: 12 m (39 ft)

Population (2021)
  - Total: 770
  - Density: 50/km^{2} (130/sq mi)
- Time zone: UTC+1 (CET)
  - Summer (DST): UTC+2 (CEST)
- Postal code: 5491
- Dialing code: 0413

Zwijnsbergen is a hamlet in the municipality of Meierijstad in North Brabant, the Netherlands.

Zwijnsbergen is best known for its castle. There was probably a fortified building at the location since the 13th century. The current castle dates from the 16th century. It was renovated and extended in 1817. Zwijnsbergen has no place name signs, and consists of about 40 houses.
