= Klooster =

Klooster (Dutch for "monastery, cloister, convent") may refer to

== Locations in the Netherlands ==
- 't Klooster, a neighborhood in Gelderland
- Klooster (Drenthe), a village
- Klooster (North Brabant), a hamlet
- Klooster-Lidlum, a village in Friesland

== People ==
- Klooster (surname)
