= Bisam Stelle =

The radarstation "Bisam Stelle", sometimes referred to as "Camp Bisam" or simply "Bisam", was a German radar station during the Second World War. The station was located near the Dutch village of Strijbeek, south of Breda, about 800 meters from the border with Belgium.

== Name ==
Most of the stations of the Himmelbett program were given animal names. Bisam refers to the Muskrat, which is called a "Bisamrat" in Dutch.

== History ==
In 1940, the Germans confiscated land near Strijbeek. In March 1942, using forced labour from the local population, the Germans built the radar station as part of the Himmelbett program. The purpose of Bisam Stelle was to spot allied bombers heading for the Gilze-Rijen Air Base. The telephone cable to the airbase was often sabotaged by the Dutch resistance. As a counter-measure, civilians were ordered to protect the lines under threat of deportation. On the 2nd of October, 1944, an allied air raid destroyed most of the camp. What remained was destroyed two days later by the Germans. On the 29th of October, allied troops liberated the villages of Strijbeek and Galder. A monument to the station was erected in 2007.

== Description ==
The station was about 47 acres and had 200 personnel, both military and civilians from the local population, for maintenance. The station had two Würzburg-Riese radars with a diameter of 7,5 meters and a range of 70 kilometers and one Freya longdistance radar with a range of 200 kilometers. Alongside the three main radars there were also 2 Y-lines, a radio beacon, a light beacon, and many smaller antennas. The station also had an office, a waiting room, a canteen with a kitchen, and a large sleeping barrack. It was surrounded by a barbed wire barrier, about a man high. The commander of the station was Oberfeldwebel Sabottka.
