= European values =

Norms and values that Europeans have in common

European values are the norms and values that Europeans are said to have in common, and which transcend national or state identities. In addition to promoting European integration, this doctrine also provides the basis for analyses that characterise European politics, economics, and society as reflecting a shared identity. It is often associated with human rights, electoral democracy, and the rule of law.

== Overview ==
Especially in France, "the European idea" (l'idée d'Europe) is associated with political values derived from the Age of Enlightenment and the republicanism growing out of the French Revolution and the Revolutions of 1848 rather than with personal or individual identity formed by culture or ethnicity (let alone a "pan-European" construct including those areas of the continent never affected by 18th-century rationalism or Republicanism).

The phrase "European values" arises as a political neologism in the 1980s in the context of the project of European integration and the future formation of the European Union (EU). The phrase was popularised by the European Values Study, a long-term research program started in 1981, aiming to document the outlook on "basic human values" in European populations. The project had grown out of a study group on "values and social change in Europe" initiated by Jan Kerkhofs, and Ruud de Moor (Catholic University in Tilburg). The claim that the people of Europe have a distinctive set of political, economic and social norms and values that are gradually replacing national values has also been named "Europeanism" by McCormick (2010).

"European values" were contrasted to non-European values in international relations, especially in the East–West dichotomy, "European values" encompassing individualism and the idea of human rights in contrast to Eastern tendencies of collectivism. However, "European values" were also viewed critically, their "darker" side not necessarily leading to more peaceful outcomes in international relations.

The association of "European values" with European integration as pursued by the European Union came to the fore with the eastern enlargement of the EU in the aftermath of the Cold War.

The Treaty of Lisbon (2007) in article 2 lists a number of "values of the Union", including "respect for human dignity, freedom, democracy, equality, the rule of law and respect for human rights including the rights of persons belonging to minorities", invoking "a society in which pluralism, non-discrimination, tolerance, justice, solidarity and equality between women and men prevail".

The term of European values is not limited to political values like the ones defined by the EU but it can also be defined in terms of a shared European cultural heritage. Typical reference points might be classical antiquity, Christianity, the Renaissance, or the Enlightenment, all of which might be referenced as the source of values.

== Habermas and Derrida (2005) ==
The philosophers Jürgen Habermas and Jacques Derrida wrote an article for the newspaper Frankfurter Allgemeine Zeitung in which they claimed the birth of a 'European public sphere'. They argued that new values and habits had given contemporary Europe 'its own face', and saw an opportunity for the construction of a 'core Europe' (excluding Britain and Eastern Europe) that might be a counterweight to the United States.

Attempting to explain what Europe represented, the two philosophers listed six facets of what they described as a common European 'political mentality':

- Secularisation.
- Trust in the state and scepticism about the achievements of markets.
- Realistic expectations about technological progress.
- Welfarism.
- A low threshold of tolerance for the use of force.
- Multilateralism within the framework of a reformed United Nations.

== McCormick (2010) ==
Political scientist John McCormick expands on these ideas, and identifies the following as core attributes of Europeanism:

- Secularism is probably the one quality most clearly associated with Europe: while religion continues to grow in most of the rest of the world, in virtually every European country, its role is declining, and it plays an increasingly marginal role in politics and public life, while heavily influencing Europeanist attitudes towards science and towards public policies in which religious belief plays a role.
- A rethinking of the meaning of citizenship and patriotism. In regard to the latter, pride in country is being replaced with pride in ideas, otherwise known as constitutional patriotism. Identification with nations or states is being increasingly joined with identification with Europe.
- Cosmopolitanism, or an association with universal ideas, and a belief that all Europeans, and possibly even all humans, belong to a single moral community that transcends state boundaries or national identities. The local and the global cannot be separated or divorced.
- Communitarianism, which - in contrast to the liberal emphasis on individual rights - supports a balance between individual and community interests, emphasizing the responsibilities of government to all those who live under its jurisdiction. Europeanism argues that society may sometimes be a better judge of what is good for individuals rather than vice versa.
- The collective society. Europeanism emphasizes the view that societal divisions will occur in spite of attempts to ensure equal opportunity, and accepts the role of the state as an economic manager and as a guarantor of societal welfare.
- Welfarism, or a reference to Europeanist ideas that while individual endeavor is to be welcomed, applauded and rewarded, the community has a responsibility for working to ensure that the playing field is as level as possible, and that opportunity and wealth are equitably distributed. Europeanism emphasizes equality of results over equality of opportunity.
- Sustainable development, or the belief that development should be sustainable, meeting the needs of the present without compromising the needs of future generations.
- Redefining the family. The place of the European family is changing, with fewer Europeans opting to marry, their ages at marriage rising, their divorce rates growing, their fertility rates declining, more children are being born outside marriage, and single-parent and single-person households becoming more usual.
- Working to live. Post-material Europeans are working fewer hours, are doing more with those hours, and have developed family-friendly laws and policies.
- Criminal rights. In matters of criminal justice, Europeanism means a greater emphasis on individual rights, and a preference for resolving disputes through negotiation rather than confrontation through the law.
- Opposition to capital punishment. In league with above named criminal rights. State sponsored executions are prohibited in all European Union and Council of Europe member states, and European governments have worked to achieve a global moratorium as a first step towards its worldwide abolition.
- Multiculturalism, in which Europe has a long and often overlooked tradition arising from the diversity of European societies, and a Europeanist habit of integrating core values and features from new groups with which its dominant cultures have come into contact.
- Perpetual peace. Where once Europe was a region of near constant war, conflict and political violence, it is today a region of generalised peace, and one which has made much progress along the path to achieving the Kantian condition of perpetual peace. Inter-state war in the region is alleged to be unthinkable and impossible, even during the worst economic or financial troubles.
- Multilateralism. Europeanism has eschewed national self-interest in favour of cooperation and consensus, of the promotion of values rather than interests, of reliance on international rules and agreements, and of building coalitions and working through international organisations to resolve problems.

== European Union ==
The European Union declares the fundamental EU values to be the ones "common to the Member States in a society in which pluralism, non-discrimination, tolerance, justice, solidarity and equality between women and men prevail". They are: human dignity, freedom, democracy, equality, rule of law, and human rights. These fundamental values are defined in article 2 of the Treaty of Lisbon. Article 3 defines promoting these values as one of the aims of the Union. Previously, the Charter of Fundamental Rights of the European Union of 2000 already mentioned "the indivisible, universal values of human dignity, freedom, equality and solidarity" as well as "the principles of democracy and the rule of law" in its preamble.

In 2018, the European Council issued a recommendation on "promoting common values, inclusive education, and the European dimension of teaching". In this text, the values defined in the Treaty of Lisbon are credited with inspiring the Union to bring countries together and with giving "the Union its place on the global stage". It is recommended to use education to promote the values. This is also seen as a way of combating the challenges of populism, xenophobia and nationalism.

The term of European values is often invoked by political figures at the European Union or when talking about the European Union. Especially notable are mentions of European values in discussions about who should be part of the EU. One example would be the candidate for the European Commission Martin Schulz stating that Turkey would not become an EU member under his watch since "the country is dramatically distancing itself from the EU’s democratic values". Another example would be Volodymyr Zelenskyy stating that "every European nation that shares common European values should be part of the European family" to explain why Ukraine should join the EU in the future.

== Statistics ==
The 2022 Eurobarometer survey reported that 64% of those surveyed described the EU member states as "close" in terms of "shared values" (up from 53% in 2021), 33% described them as "distant" (down from 41% in 2021). More values can be found in this table

Perception of shared values between EU member states
Year	Close	Distant
2022	64%	33%
2021	53%	41%
2019	54%	40%
2018	53%	41%
2017	52%	41%
2016	51%	42%
2015	50%	43%

In the 2020 Eurobarometer, respondents were asked 11 questions about whether or not they support specific values of the European Union:

Agreement with specific EU values
Value	Agree	Neither agree nor disagree	Disagree
Freedom of Thought, Expression and Religion	81%	14%	4%
Freedom of Peaceful Assembly, Organisation and Demonstration	77%	17%	5%
Right to Free Movement within the EU	74%	18%	7%
Opposition to Death Penalty	57%	25%	16%
Granting of Political Asylum	66%	23%	9%
Enabling Socially Vulnerable Citizens to Lead a Decent Life	76%	18%	5%
Equality Before the Law, and the Right to a Fair Trial	82%	12%	5%
Independent Judiciary	82%	12%	5%
Respect for Choice of Personal Lifestyle and Family	79%	14%	6%
Rejection of Discrimination on any Grounds	79%	15%	5%
Gender Equality	79%	15%	5%

== Criticisms and discussions ==
The term of European values is somewhat unclear and has been interpreted as a number of different things. Such interpretations include the values that most Europeans could agree on either for their personal lifes or for their political institutions. The term might also hint at what distinguishes the values of Europeans from those of non-Europeans. Regarding Europeans views on their institutions one might differentiate between the expressed values of the EU, other shared values like those identified by Habermas/Derrida and McCormick or values rooted in a European cultural heritage.

Referring to the expressed values of the European Union as European values has been criticized since these values are mostly those of liberal democracy and therefore broadly western or even universal rather than distinctly European. It might be generally difficult to speak of European values, if differences between European countries are as big as the differences between European and some non-European countries.

The idea of European values has also been criticized for being mainly used as a strategy of legitimization and normative justification by EU officials. According to this view, the redefinition of the EU as a community of values rather than a mostly economic Union would be a tool to increase popular support for European integration.

=== Debate on Christian heritage ===
One discussion on the nature of European values concerned whether they were rooted in Christianity. This claim was advanced by Pope John Paul II when he claimed in 2003 that "it is undeniable that Christianity has been the force able to promote, reconcile and consolidate [these values]". This happened amidst the drafting of the Treaty establishing a Constitution for Europe and the debate on whether Christianity should be mentioned in its preamble. This proposal was supported by the governments of Italy, Poland, Lithuania, Slovakia, Portugal, Czech Republic, Malta and Greece. In the end, Christianity found no mention in the proposed treaty, which only referenced the "cultural, religious and humanist inheritance of Europe".

=== European populism ===
Some scholars see the rise of (right-wing) populism as challenging the values defined by the EU. While many right-populist parties across Europe want to change the EU rather than abolishing it, they still find themselves in opposition to many of the expressed values. A populist critique might see these values as those of a specific liberal and cosmopolitan worldview rather than values shared by most Europeans. The European Union has also acknowledged this as a challenge to its values, declaring in its 2018 recommendation on promoting common values that populism and nationalism are threats to the values of the Union and should be fought by promoting the values through education.

== See also ==
- Western values (West)
- Americanism (ideology)
- Asian values
- Christendom
- Europhile
- Pan-European identity
- Pro-Europeanism
