= Heikant, Alphen-Chaam =

Heikant
- Hamlet
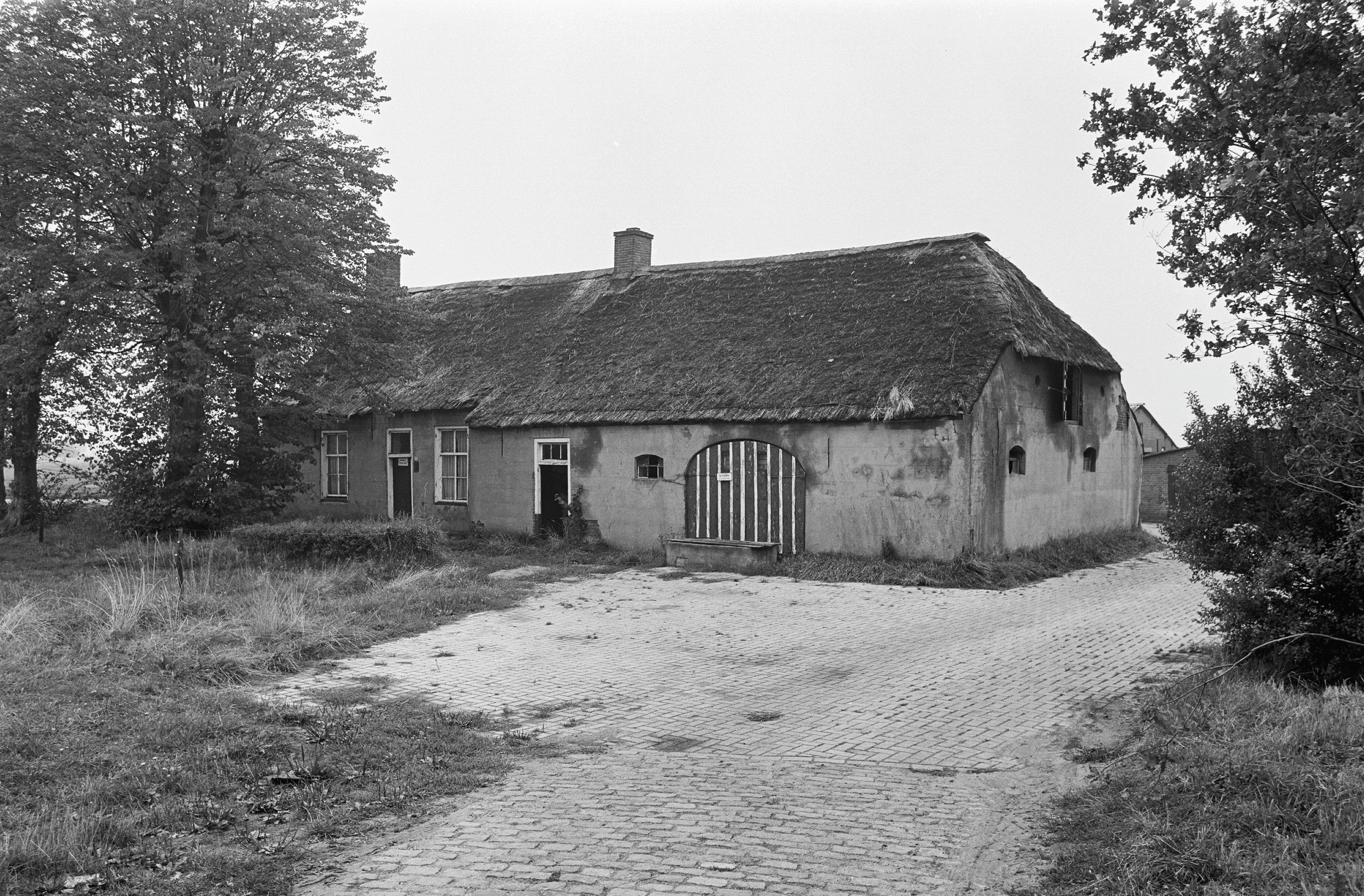
- Farm in Heikant

- Location in the province of North Brabant in the Netherlands Heikant (Netherlands)
- Coordinates: 51°30′57″N 4°52′20″E
- Country: Netherlands
- Province: North Brabant
- Municipality: Alphen-Chaam
- Time zone: UTC+1 (CET)
  - Summer (DST): UTC+2 (CEST)
- Postal code: 4861
- Dialing code: 0161

Heikant is a hamlet in the Dutch province of North Brabant. It is located in the municipality of Alphen-Chaam, about 2 km northeast of Chaam.

Heikant is not a statistical entity, and the postal authorities have placed it under Chaam. It was first mentioned in 1685 as aen den Heycant, and means "on the edge of the heath".

Heikant was home to 252 people in 1840. Nowadays, it consists of about 80 house. The Roman Catholic Church of the parish of Chaam used to be in this hamlet, but it was moved to the village of Chaam in 1842.
