= Alphen en Riel =

Coordinates: 51°30′N 4°59′E

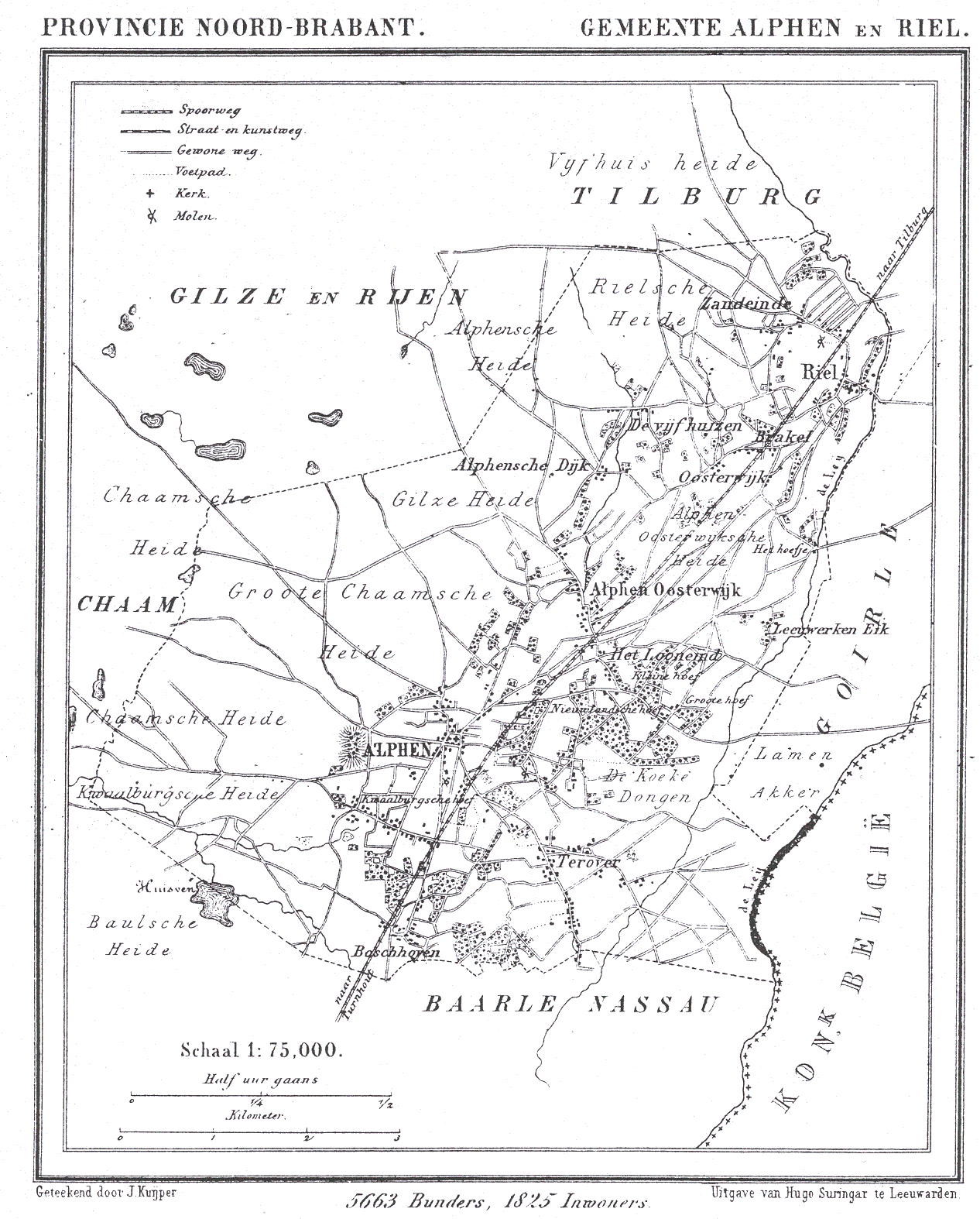

Alphen en Riel is a former municipality in the Dutch province of North Brabant. It covered the villages of Alphen and Riel. In 1997, the municipality was divided between the new municipality of Alphen-Chaam, and the municipality of Goirle.
