= Alphen, North Brabant =

Alphen
- Village
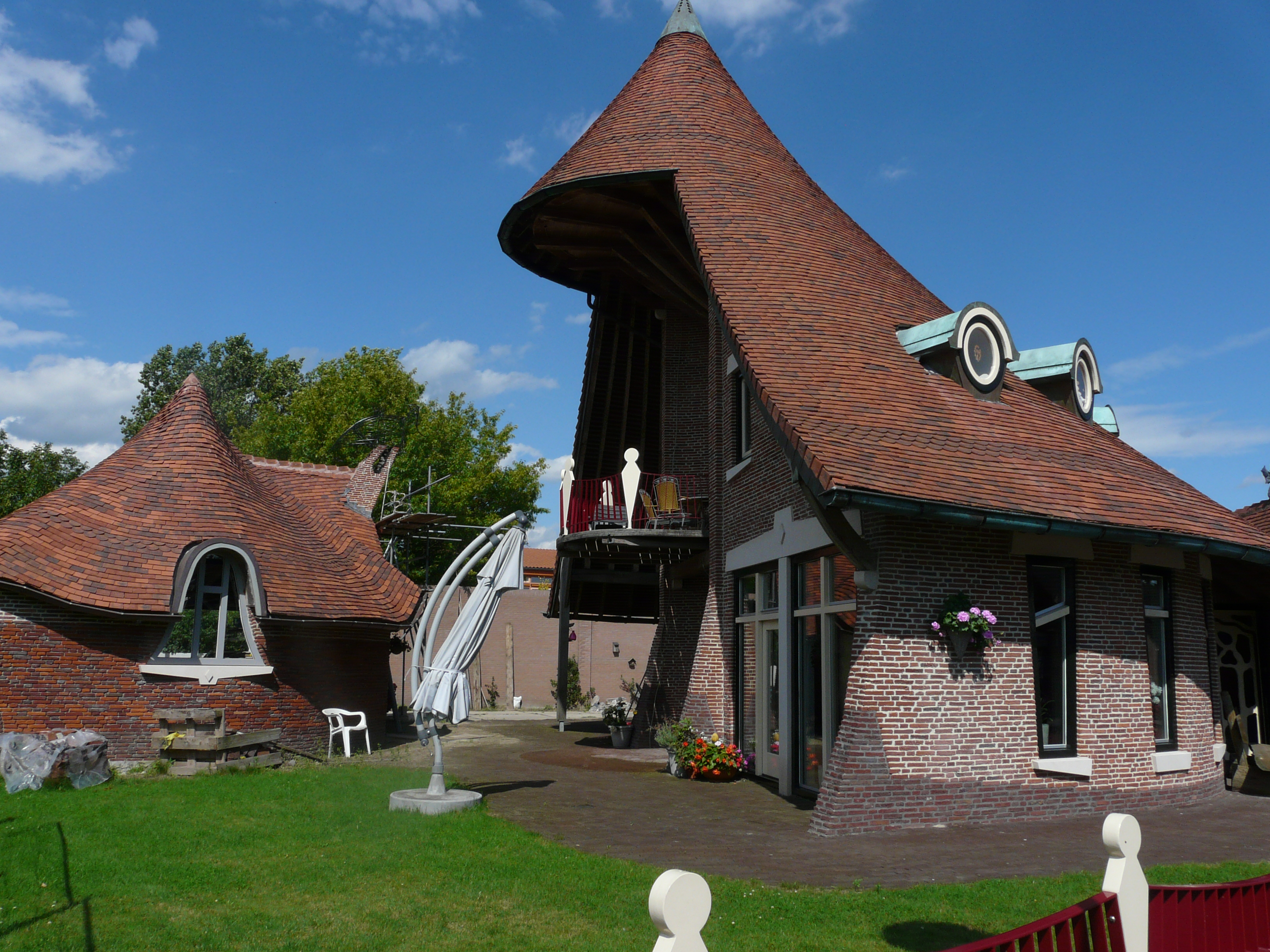
- House in Alphen

- Flag Coat of arms

- Location in the province of North Brabant in the Netherlands Alphen (Netherlands)
- Coordinates: 51°28′51″N 4°57′22″E
- Country: Netherlands
- Province: North Brabant
- Municipality: Alphen-Chaam

Area
  - Total: 39.92 km^{2} (15.41 sq mi)
- Elevation: 24 m (79 ft)

Population (2021)
  - Total: 4,305
  - Density: 107.8/km^{2} (279.3/sq mi)
- Time zone: UTC+1 (CET)
  - Summer (DST): UTC+2 (CEST)
- Postal code: 5130 & 5131
- Dialing code: 013

Alphen is a village in the municipality of Alphen-Chaam, in the Netherlands. It is located about 12 km southwest of Tilburg.

== History ==
Alphen was first mentioned in 709, when a nobleman named Engelbrecht sold "Alfheim" to Saint Willibrord. In 739, it was sold on to the Abbey of Echternach. Alphen was originally a collection of hamlets which started to concentrate around the church.

The Catholic St Willibrord Church was built in 1954 to replace a church from 1909-1910 which was destroyed in 1944. The earliest church dated from the 16th century and had a tower which was built around 1559. The emergency church, which was built in 1945, is still located next to the St Willibrord Church.

In 1542, Alphen was burned to the ground by the army of Guelders under Maarten van Rossum, and in 1944, it suffered from destruction and looting as well.

Alphen includes the hamlets of 't Zand, Alphen-Oosterwijk, Druisdijk, Looneind, Boslust, Hondseind, Het Sas, Terover, Boshoven and Kwaalburg.

Alphen was home to 431 people in 1840. Until 1997, Alphen was the main village of the municipality of Alphen en Riel.

== Notable people ==
- Jelle Klaassen

== Gallery ==
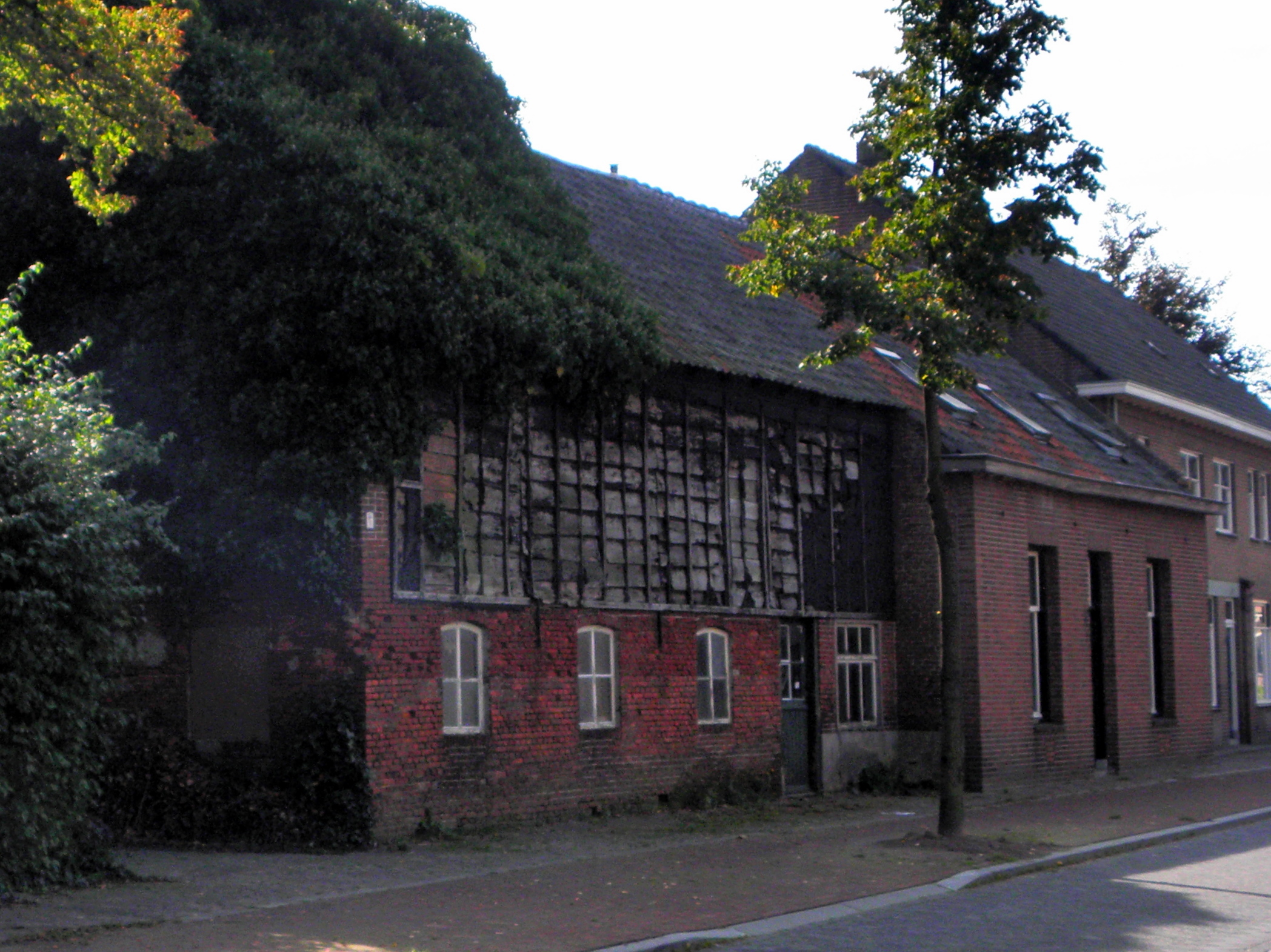
Former tannery

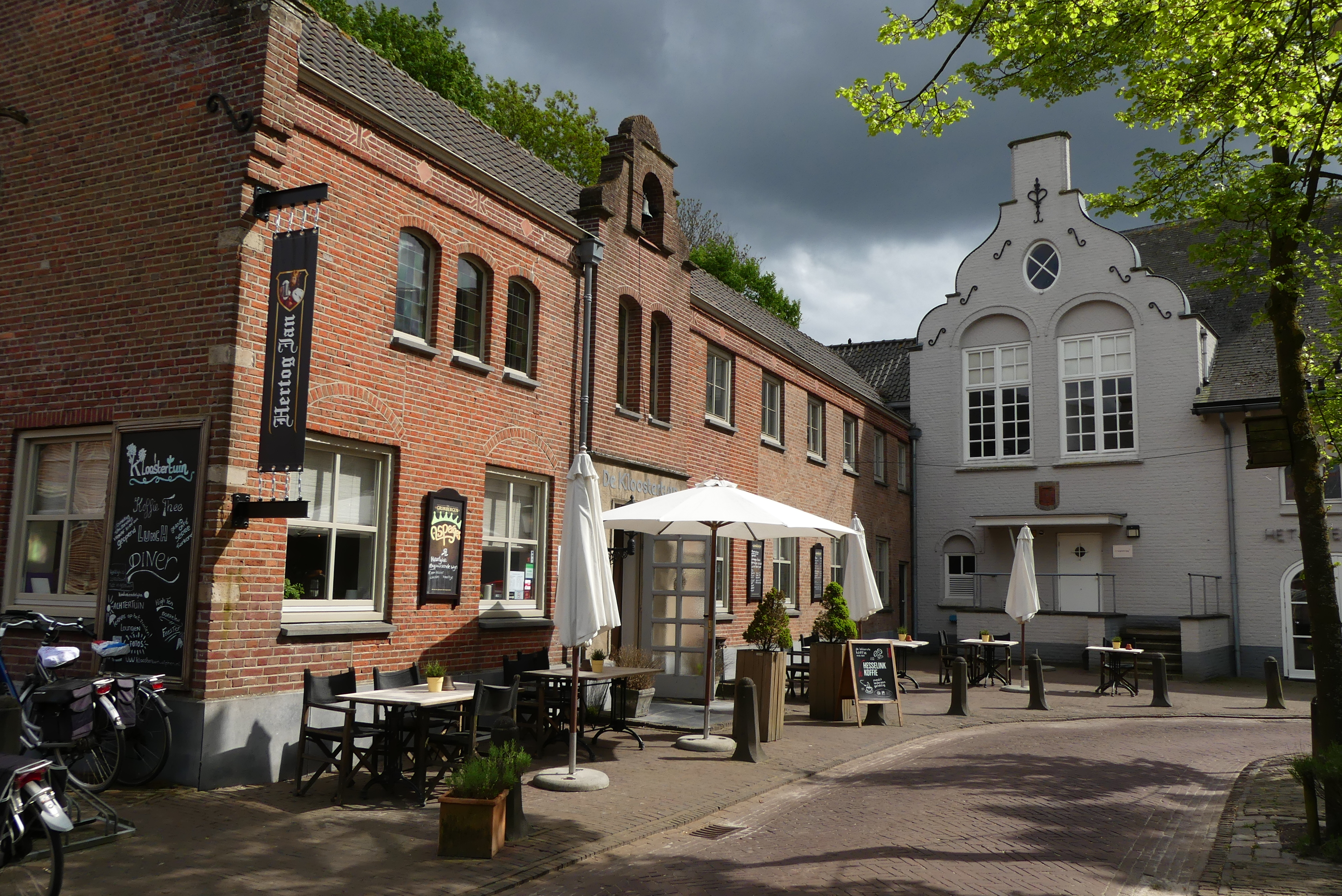
Monastery garden

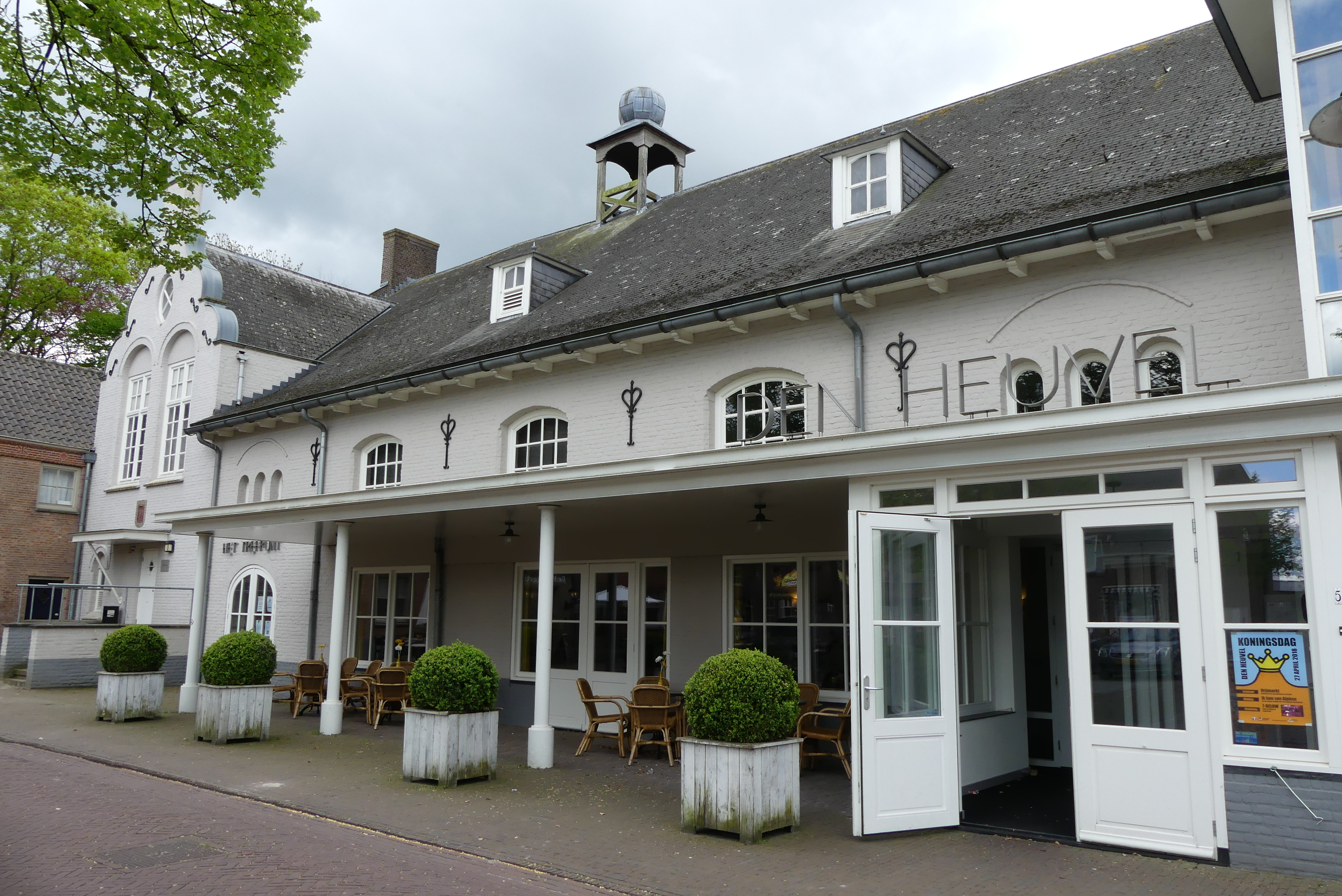
Restaurant in Alphen

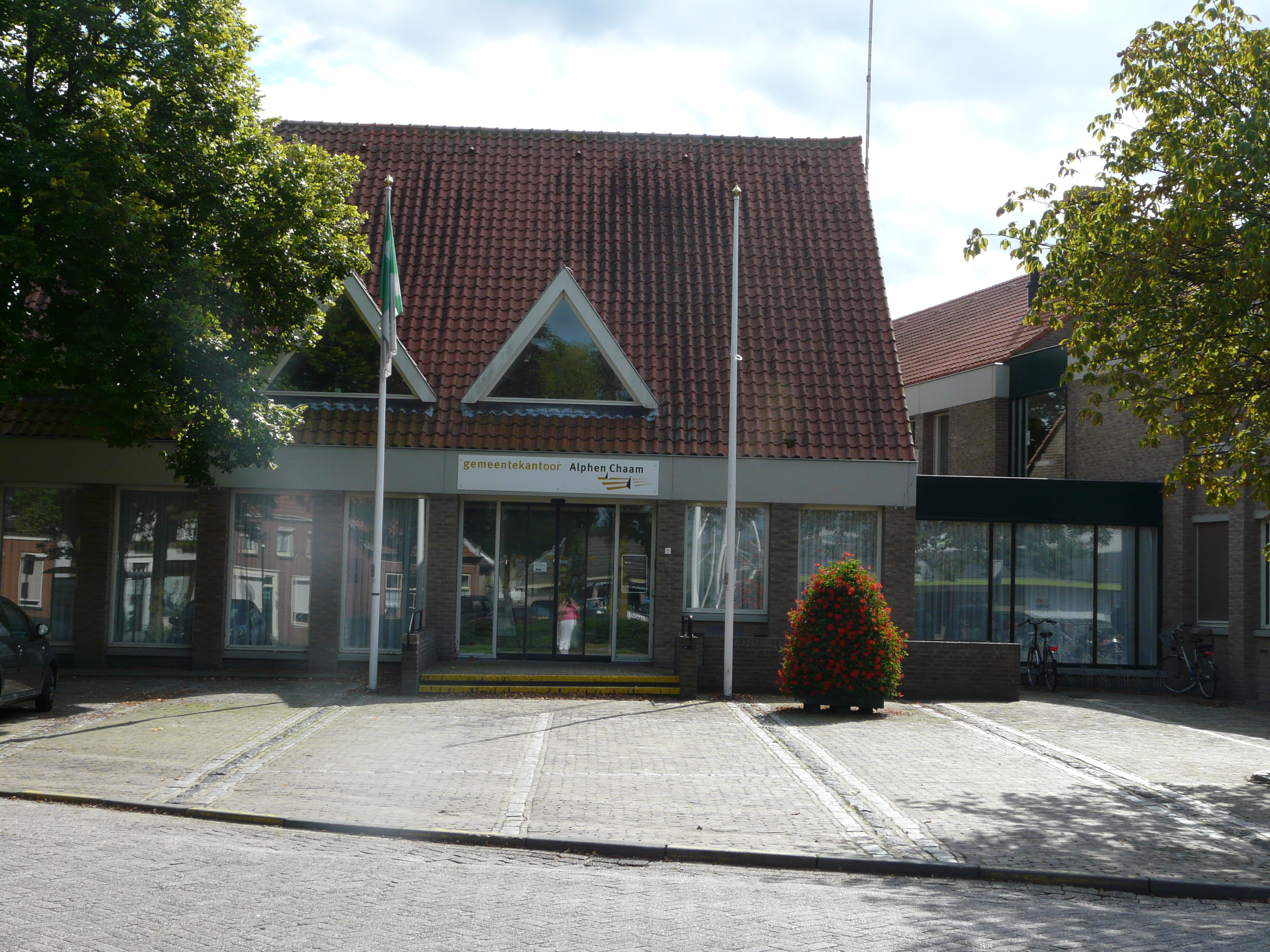
Town hall
