= Meersel-Dreef =

Village in Hoogstraten, Belgium

- Village
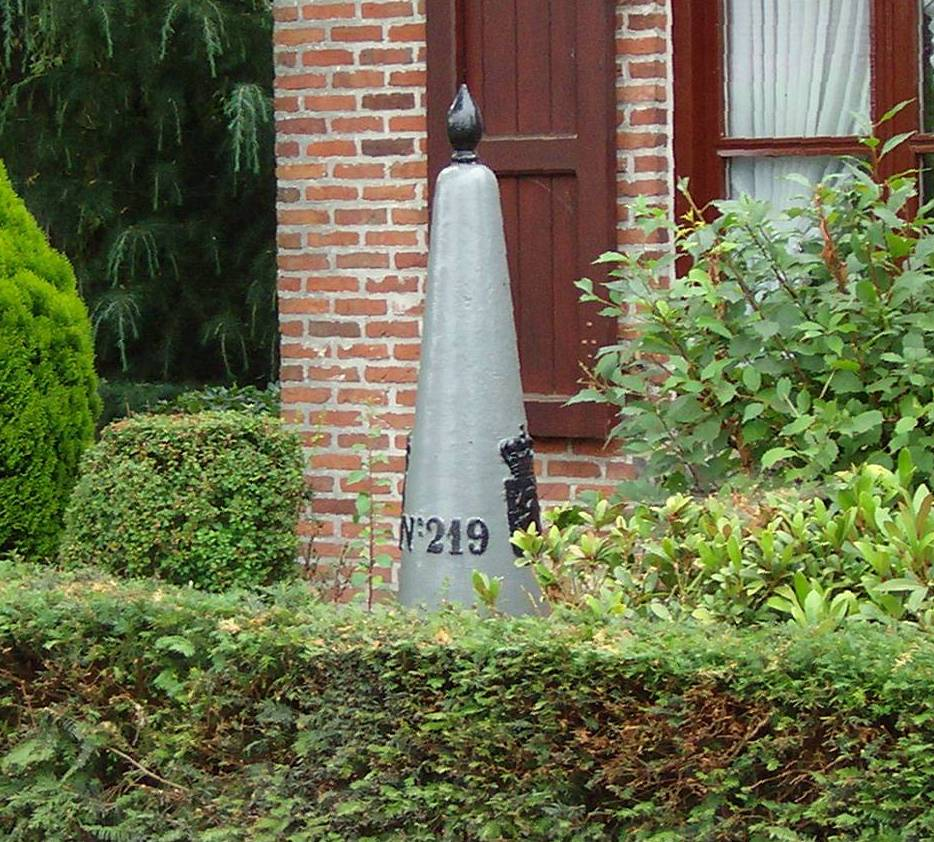
- Northernmost border stone of Belgium

- Location in Belgium
- Coordinates: 51.4978°N 4.7750°E
- Country: Belgium
- Region: Flemish Region
- Province: Antwerp
- Municipality: Hoogstraten

Area
  - Total: 1.35 km^{2} (0.52 sq mi)

Population (2021)
  - Total: 671
  - Density: 497/km^{2} (1,290/sq mi)
- Time zone: CET

Meersel-Dreef is a village in the Belgian municipality of Hoogstraten in the province of Antwerp, Belgium.

Meersel-Dreef is the northernmost point of Belgium, and directly borders the Netherlands. The bordermarker of the picture, no. 219 is NOT the Northernmost point of the Kingdom Belgium. That point actually is 30 mtrs. up north and can be found at bordermarker (borderstone) 219a.

== Name ==
"Meersel" is derived from the Germanic "mariski", meaning land along a watercourse, or from "mari", meaning lake, and "sali", meaning house.

== History ==
Meersel-Dreef was originally two villages, Meersel and Dreef. They have been inhabited since at least the Middle Ages. The two villages grew together over time around the Capuchin monastery, which was built in 1687 near the river Mark. It was founded by Jan de Wyse, a wealthy merchant from Breda, on land donated by Maria Gabriella de Lalaing, Countess of Hoogstraten.

In 1223 there was already a chapel in Meersel. In 1421 a new chapel was built by the lord of Hoogstraten. This chapel, St. Lucia Chapel, was inaugurated on April 28 of that year and served as an auxiliary chapel for the Church of Meerle. The chapel remains is a popular pilgrimage site. It was restored in 1935 and again in 1982, and was classified as a protected monument in 1953.

== Geography ==
The village is located on the river Mark. It lies between Galder and Groot Eisel. It is the most northerly village in Belgium.

== Public Transport ==
There is a De Lijn bus to Antwerp, number 600. There is also a direct once an hour bus service to Breda in The Netherlands, Bravo/Arriva line 176.
