= Klooster, North Brabant =

Hamlet in the Dutch province of North Brabant

Klooster
- Hamlet
- Location in the province of North Brabant in the Netherlands Klooster (Netherlands)
- Coordinates: 51.528°N 4.862°E
- Country: Netherlands
- Province: North Brabant
- Municipality: Alphen-Chaam
- Time zone: UTC+1 (CET)
  - Summer (DST): UTC+2 (CEST)
- Postal code: 4861
- Dialing code: 0161

Klooster is a hamlet in the Dutch province of North Brabant. It is located in the municipality of Alphen-Chaam, approximately two kilometres north of the town of Chaam.

Klooster is not a statistical entities, and the postal authorities have placed it under Chaam. The hamlet was first mentioned between 1838 and 1857 as 't Klooster. No monastery has been known to exist at the location, and therefore, it probably means "closed off pasture". There are no place name signs, and it consists of about 10 houses.
