= Riel, Netherlands =

Riel
- Village
- Regte Heide in winter, with Riel in the background
- Interactive map of Riel
- Coordinates: 51°31′26″N 5°1′18″E
- Country: Netherlands
- Province: North Brabant
- Municipality: Goirle

Area
  - Total: 1.73 km^{2} (0.67 sq mi)
- Elevation: 15 m (49 ft)

Population (2021)
  - Total: 2,560
  - Density: 1,480/km^{2} (3,830/sq mi)
- Time zone: UTC+1 (CET)
  - Summer (DST): UTC+2 (CEST)
- Postal code: 5133
- Dialing code: 013

Riel is a village (Dutch: dorp) in the municipality of Goirle, south of Tilburg in the province of North Brabant. Until 1997 it belonged to the municipality Alphen en Riel. On the east it is bordered by the stream valley of the river Donge, on the west by the deactivated railroad Turnhout- Tilburg.

Riel is a so-called esdorp. The village grew and stretched out as new enclosures took place alongside the main road. First development took place as early as in the 7th century, with a peak in the 12th century when the church stimulated the enclosure of the common grounds and development.

Nowadays Riel is a commuter village. In the South and East large nature preserves are located, such as the moor "Regte Heide", also a tumulus site, "Riels Laag" and hunting ground "Hoefke". Because the stream valley cuts through moor and sandy areas, there is a considerable difference in heights.

== Gallery ==
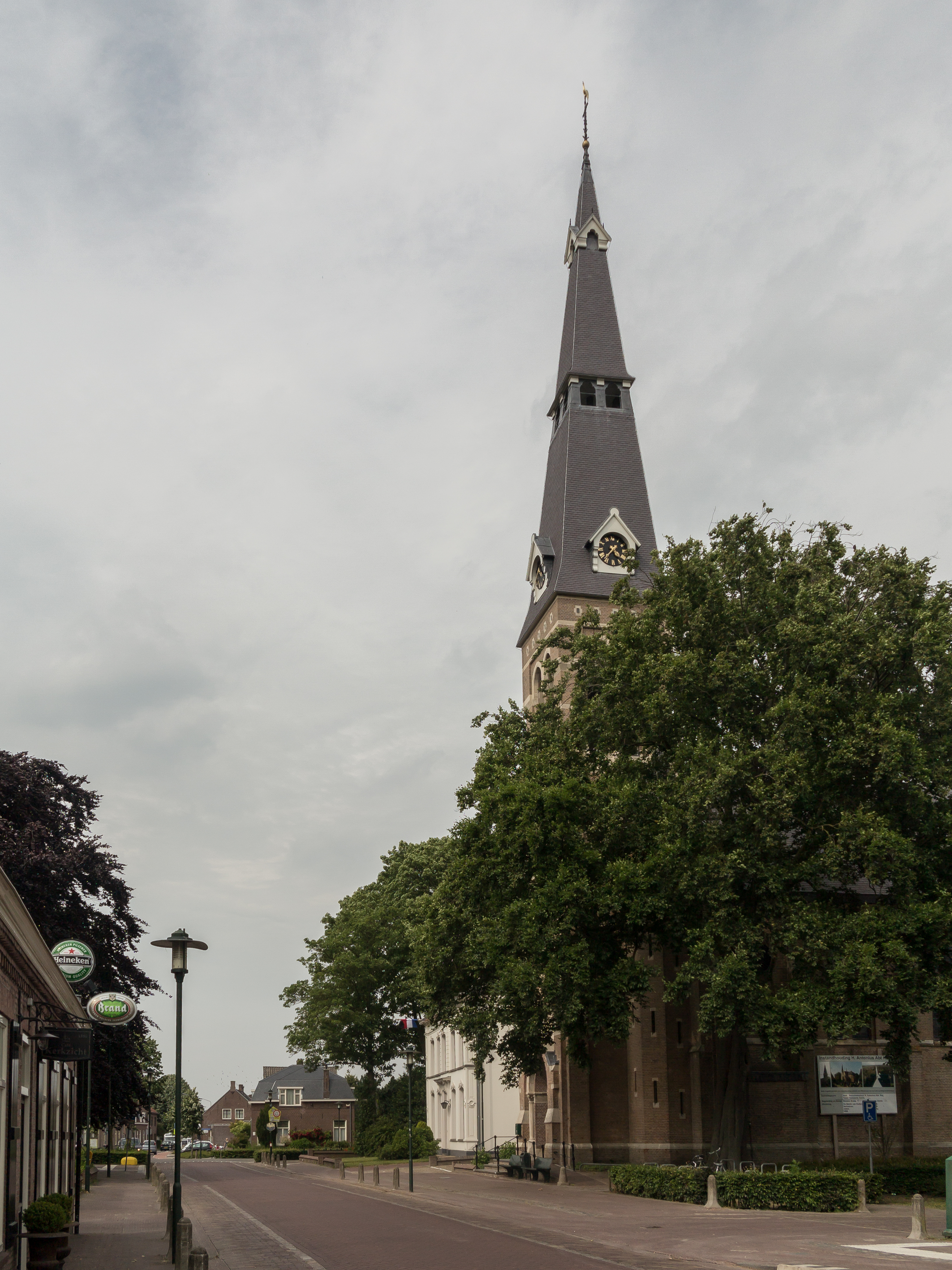
Riel, church: de Sint Antonius Abtkerk

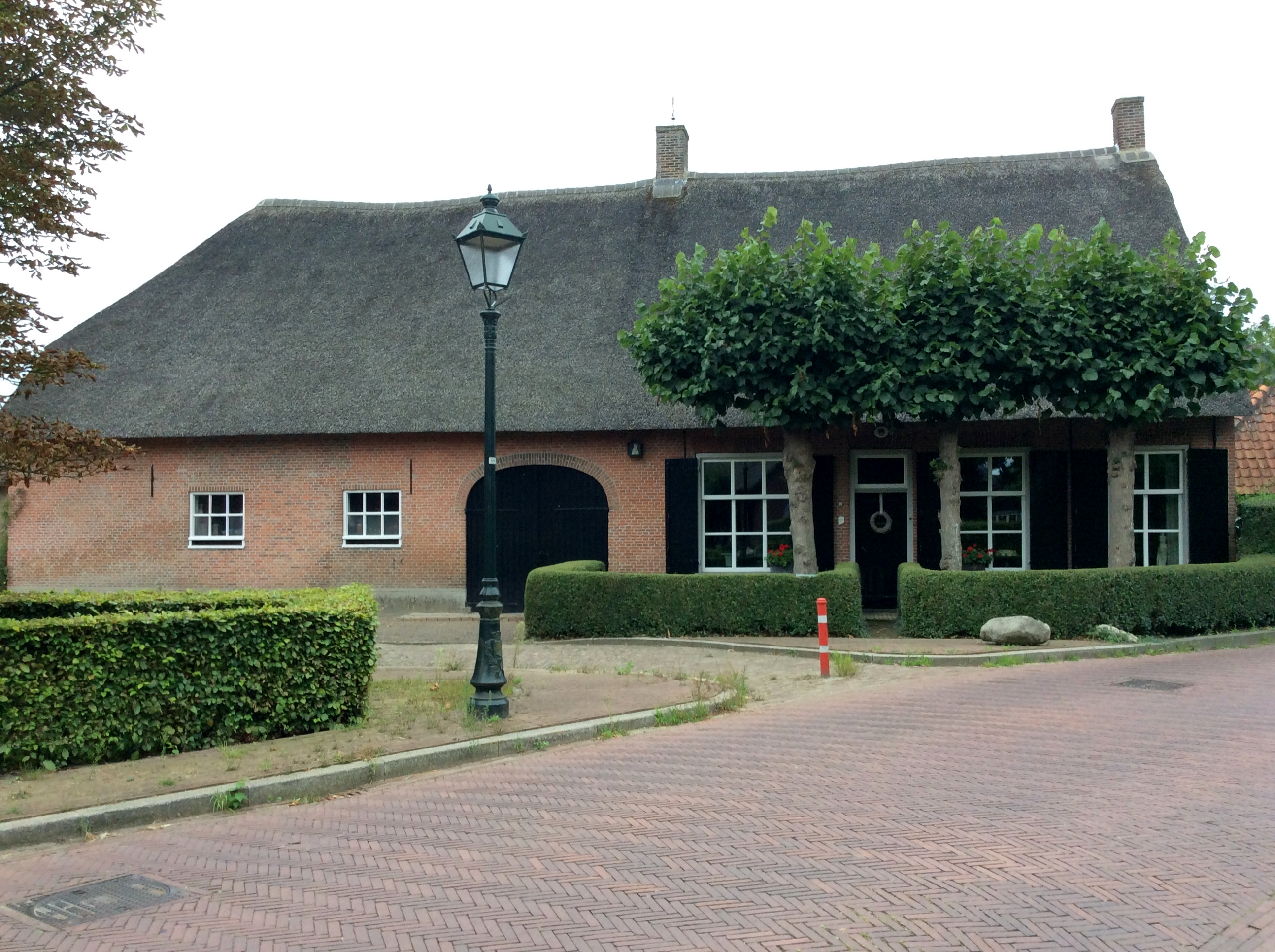
Farm in Riel

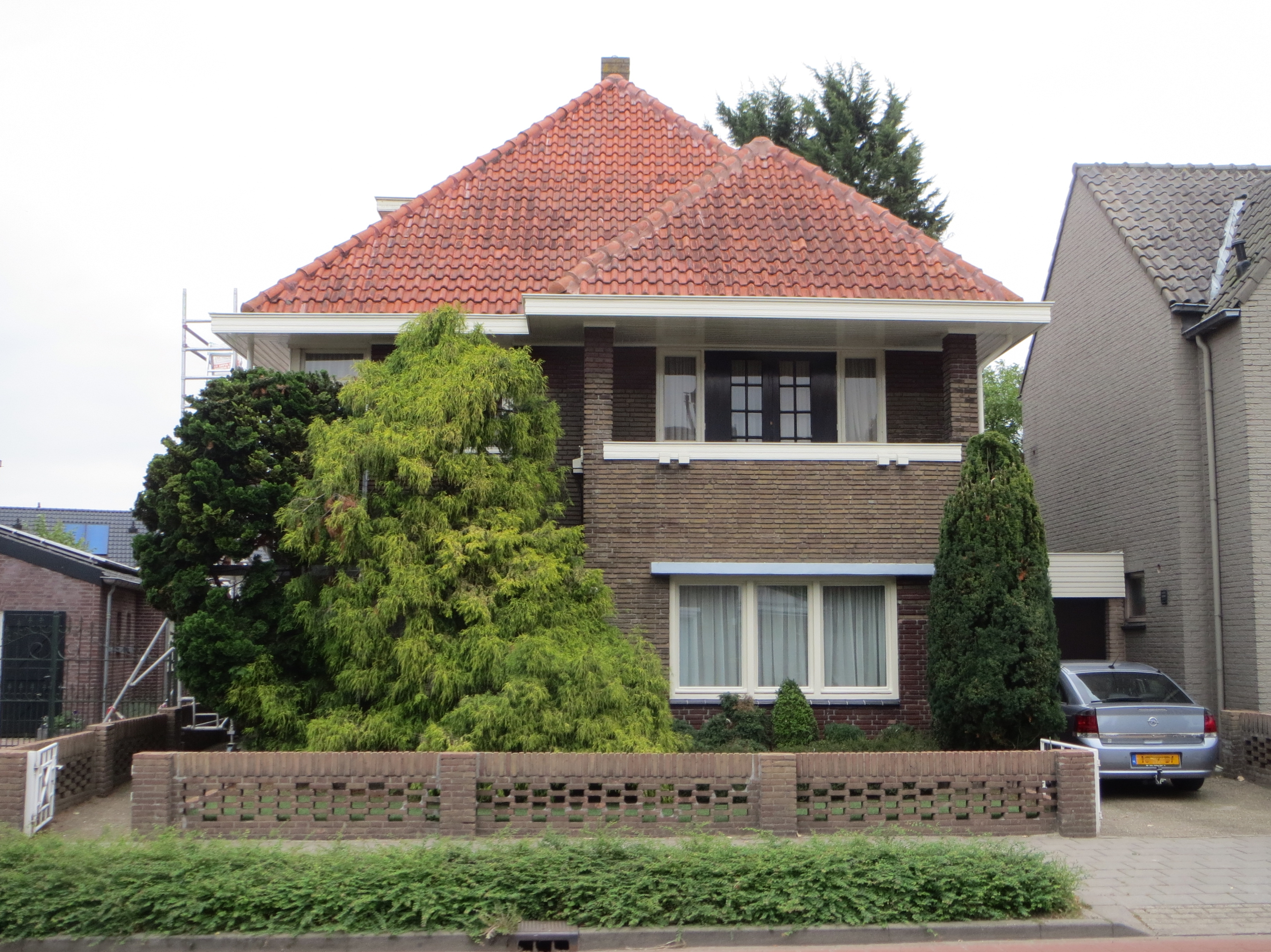
House in Riel

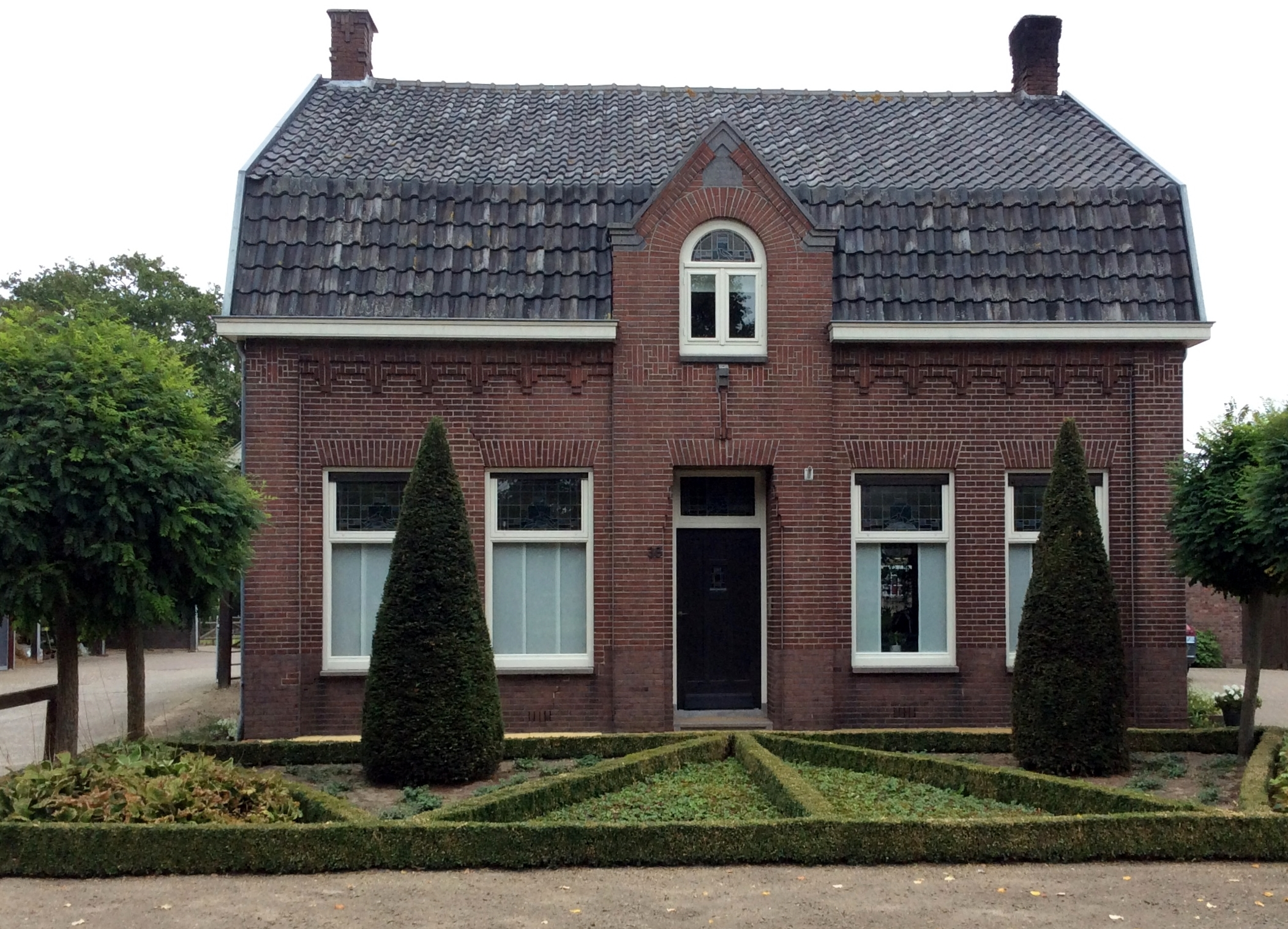
House in Riel
