= Galder, Netherlands =

Galder
- Village
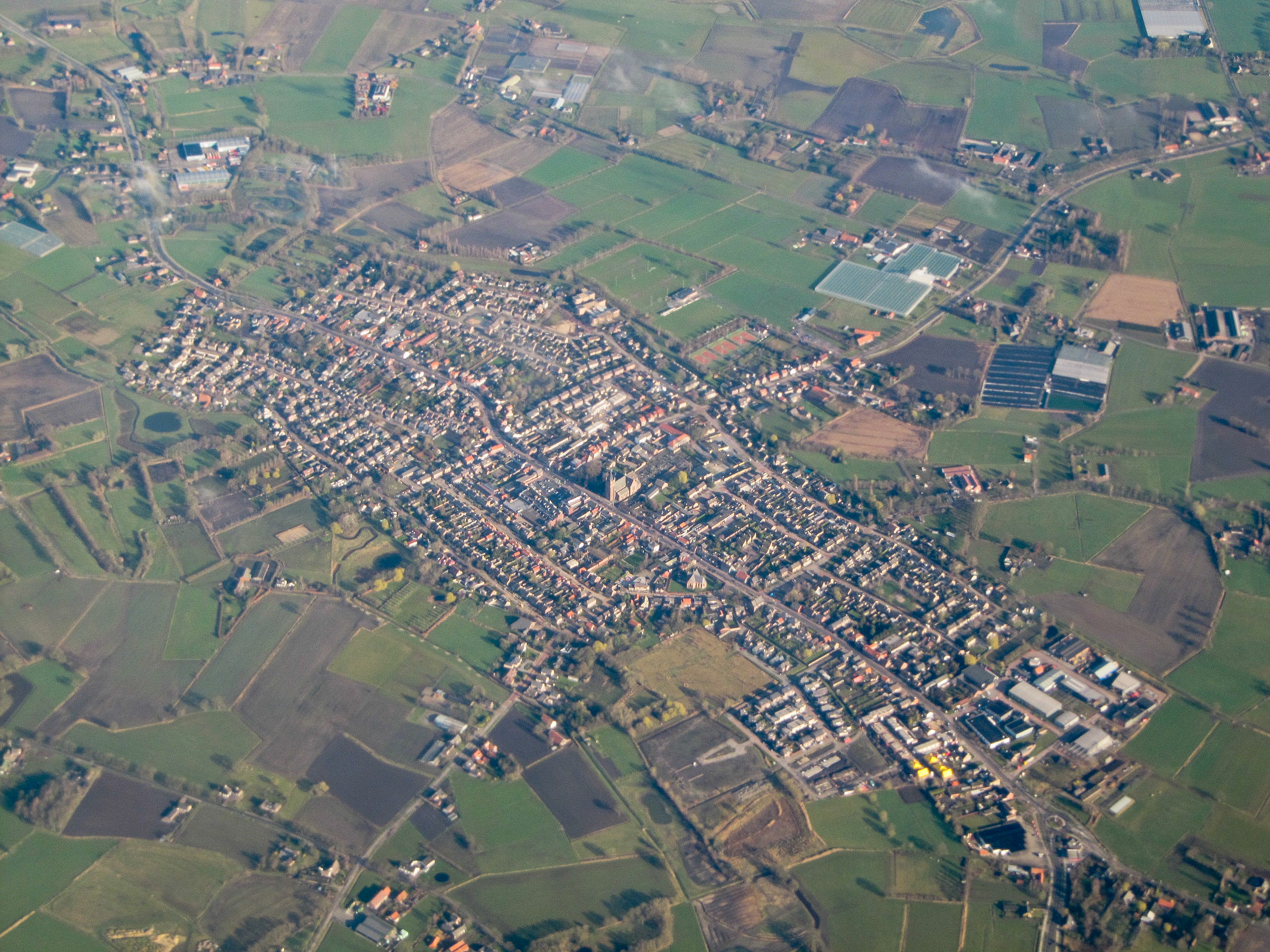

- Flag Coat of arms

- Location in the province of North Brabant in the Netherlands Galder (Netherlands)
- Coordinates: 51°30′54″N 4°46′33″E
- Country: Netherlands
- Province: North Brabant
- Municipality: Alphen-Chaam

Area
  - Total: 5.49 km^{2} (2.12 sq mi)
- Elevation: 3.6 m (12 ft)

Population (2025)
  - Total: 1,095
  - Density: 199/km^{2} (517/sq mi)
- Time zone: UTC+1 (CET)
  - Summer (DST): UTC+2 (CEST)
- Postal code: 4855
- Dialing code: 076

Galder is a village in the Dutch province of North Brabant. It is located in the municipality of Alphen-Chaam 8 km south of the city of Breda.

== History ==
The village was first mentioned in 1299 as Galre. It is possibly a name of a stream. Galder started as a hamlet in a valley near a brook.

The Saint Jacob's Chapel was built in 1468. The tower probably dates from 1517. In 1824, it was converted into a school and the tower and ceiling were lowered. In 1882, it was recommissioned as a church.

Galder was home to 301 people in 1840.

The Galderse Heide is a heath near the village. About 20 hectares (49 acres) are owned by the Ministry of Defence and sometimes used as a shooting range. There is a nature bath and a recreational area on nature area.

== Demographics ==
As demonstrated in the table below, the biggest age group of Galder are middle-aged adults (aged 45-65).

Age distribution in Galder
Age group	Amount in numbers	Percentage
0-15	185	16.9%
15-25	90	8.2%
25-45	240	21.9%
45-65	330	30.1%
65+	245	22.4%

91,8% of residents are born inside of the Netherlands, 8,2% are foreign-born residents.

33,3% of foreign-born residents are born inside of Europe, 66,7% are born outside of Europe.

== Transportation ==
Galder is connected to Breda railway station and Meersel-Dreef by bus 176.

== Facilities ==
There are 2 schools in Galder; the Mattheusschool at the Sint Jacobsstraat and catholic school Het Groene Lint at the Galderseweg.

There are almost no other facilities in Galder, for supermarkets and other facilities you have to go to Breda, Zundert or Chaam.

== Gallery ==
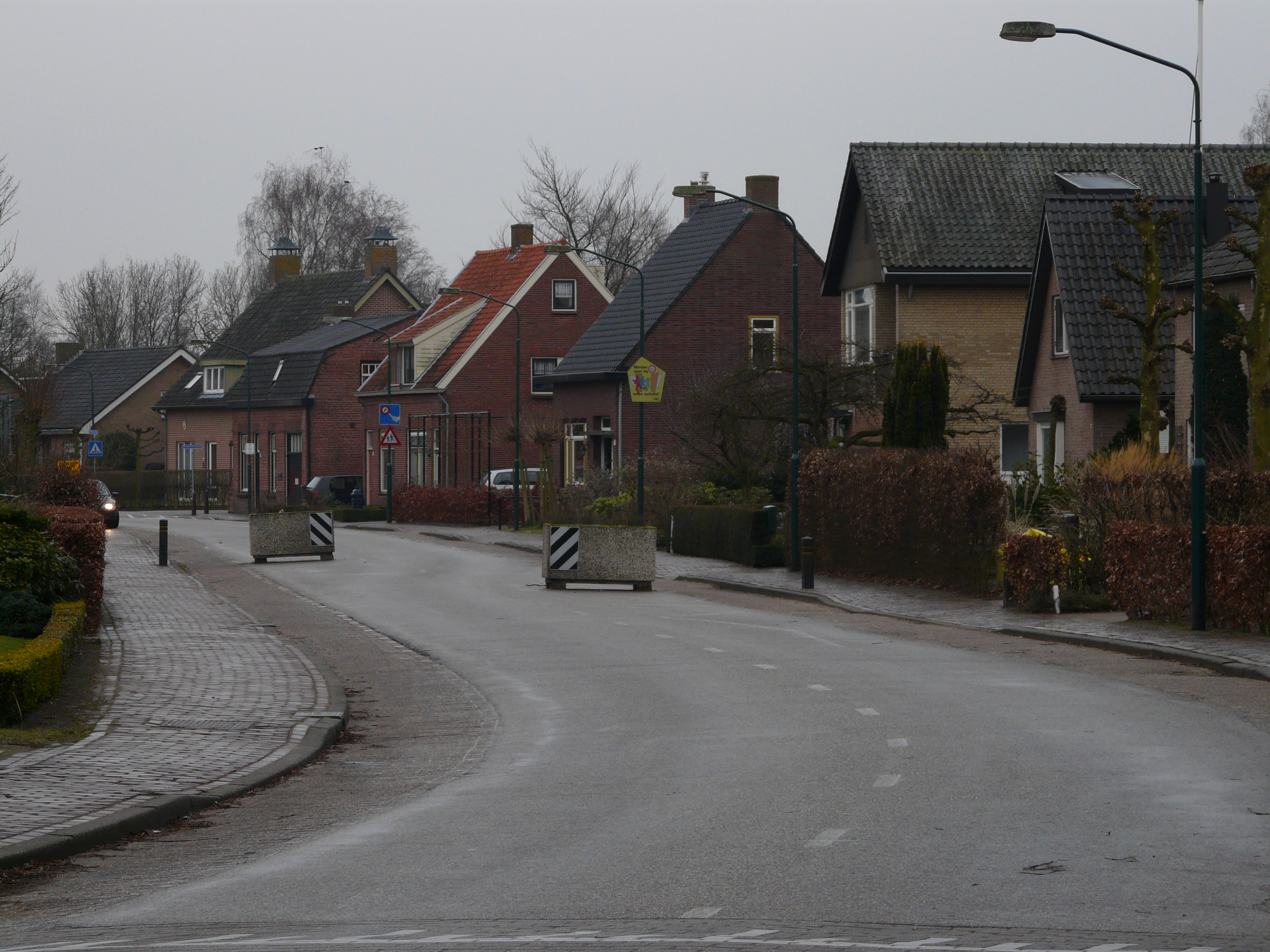
Street view

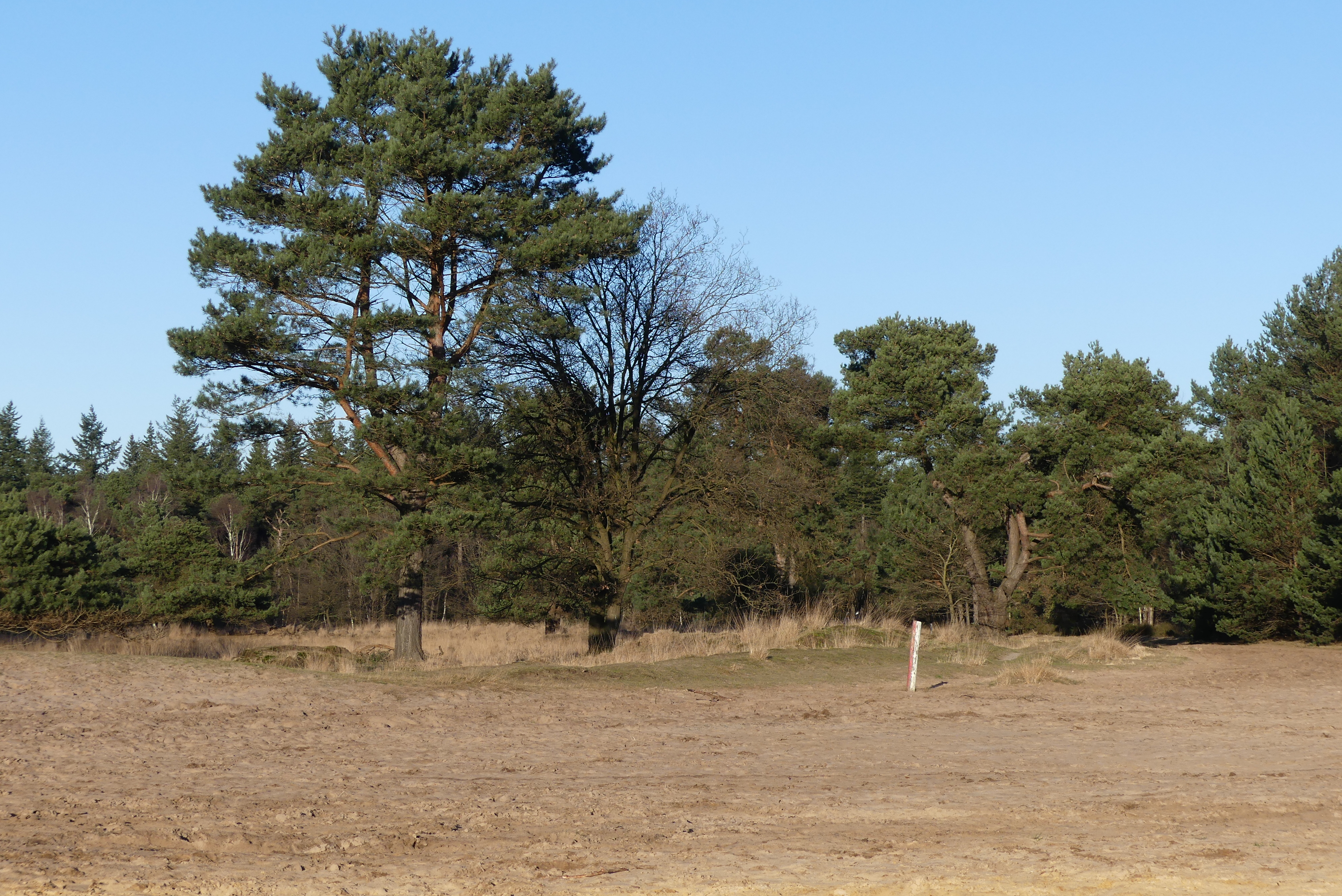
Galderse Heide
