= Alphen-Chaam =

- Municipality
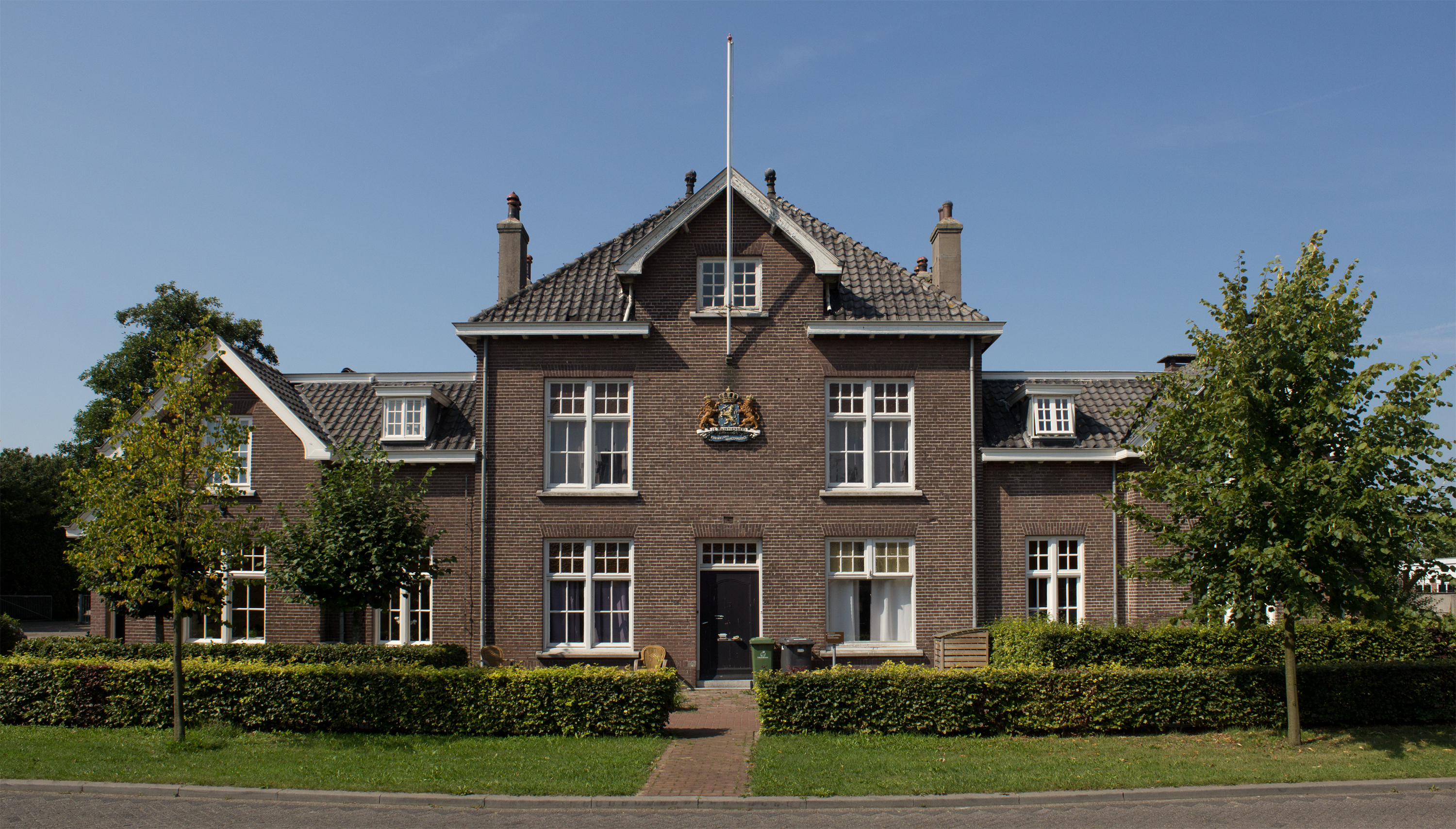
- Alphen - Marechausseekazerne

- Flag Coat of arms

- Location in North Brabant
- Coordinates: 51°29′N 4°57′E
- Country: Netherlands
- Province: North Brabant
- Established: 1 January 1997

Government
  - Body: Municipal council
  - Mayor: Joerie Minses (Ind.)

Area
  - Total: 93.52 km^{2} (36.11 sq mi)
  - Land: 93.04 km^{2} (35.92 sq mi)
  - Water: 0.48 km^{2} (0.19 sq mi)
- Elevation: 24 m (79 ft)

Population (January 2021)
  - Total: 10,373
  - Density: 111/km^{2} (290/sq mi)
- Time zone: UTC+1 (CET)
  - Summer (DST): UTC+2 (CEST)
- Postcode: 4855–4861, 5130–5131
- Area code: 013, 0161, 076
- Website: www.alphen-chaam.nl

Alphen-Chaam (Dutch pronunciation: [ˌɑlfə(ŋ) ˈxaːm]) is a municipality in the southern Netherlands.

== Population centres ==
Towns:

- Alphen (4,000)
- Chaam (3,810)
- Galder (1,190)

Hamlets (the population data of these hamlets is included in the population data of the towns near which they are located):

- Alphen-Boshoven
- Alphen-Oosterwijk
- Boslust
- Cauwelaar
- Chaamdijk
- Druisdijk
- Geersbroek
- Ginderdoor
- Grazen
- Heerstaaien
- Heikant
- Het Sas
- Hondseind
- Houtgoor
- Kalishoek
- Klooster
- Kwaalburg
- Leg
- Looneind
- Meijsberg
- Notsel
- Rakens
- Snijders-Chaam
- Strijbeek
- Terover
- Ulvenhout AC
- Venweg
- 't Zand

=== Topography ===
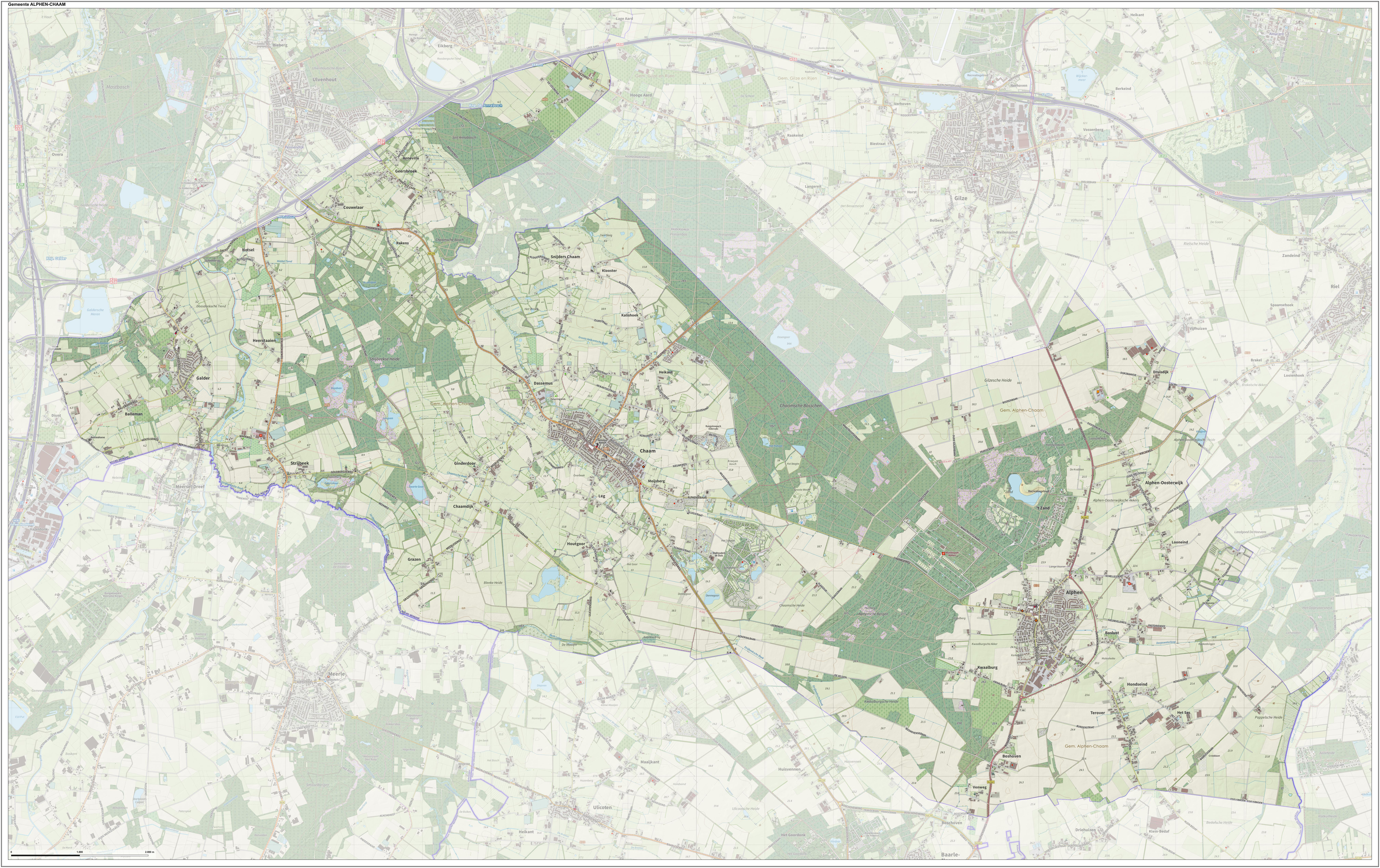

Topographic map of the municipality of Alphen-Chaam, Sept. 2014.

== Notable people ==
- Ruud de Moor (born 1928 in Chaam – 2001) professor of sociology
- Piet A. Verheyen (born 1931 in Alphen – 2021) economist and academic
- Natasha den Ouden (born 1973 in Galder) cyclist
- Jelle Klaasen (born 1984 in Alphen) professional darts player, the youngest winner of the World Darts Championship at age 21

== Gallery ==
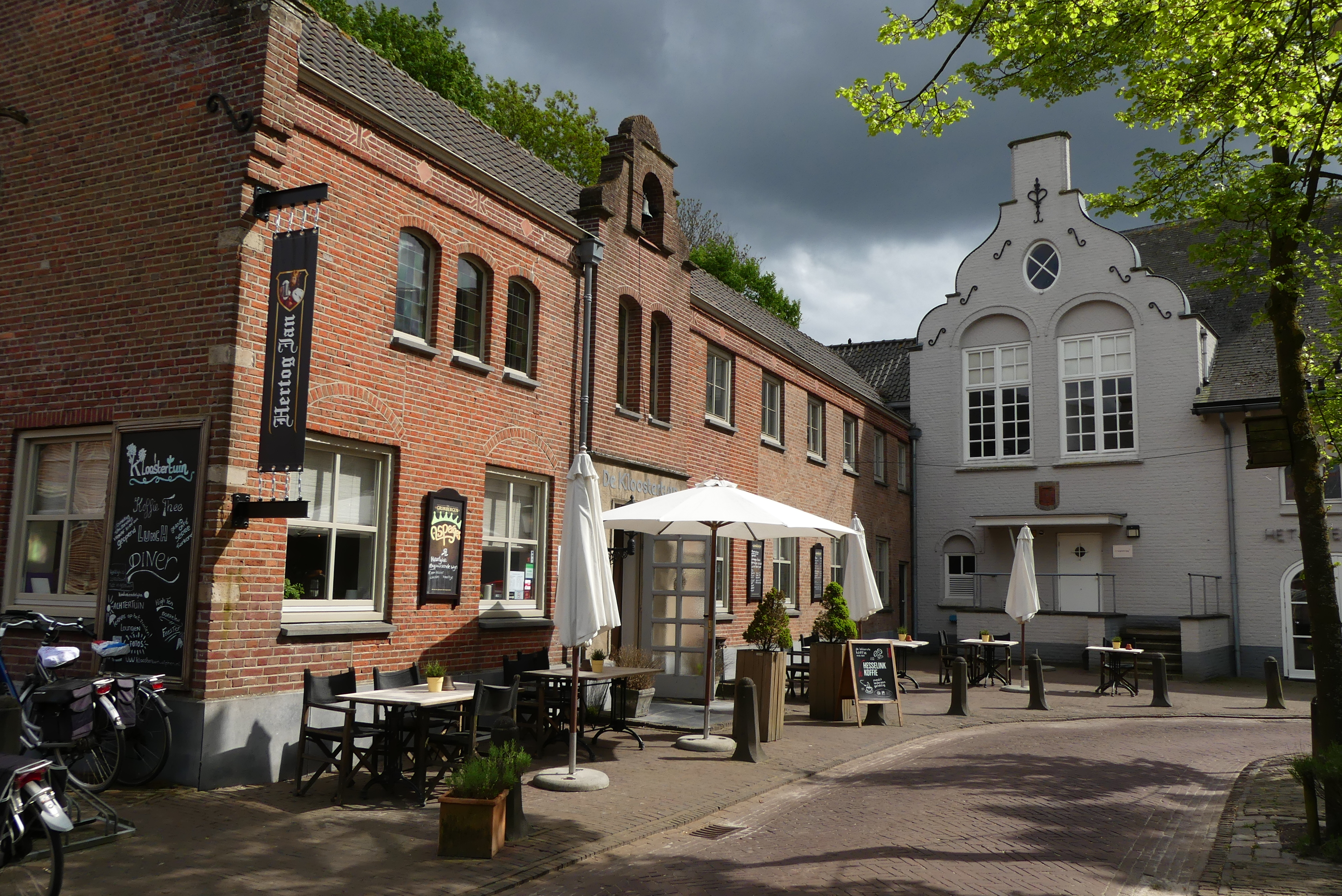
De Kloostertuin, Alphen

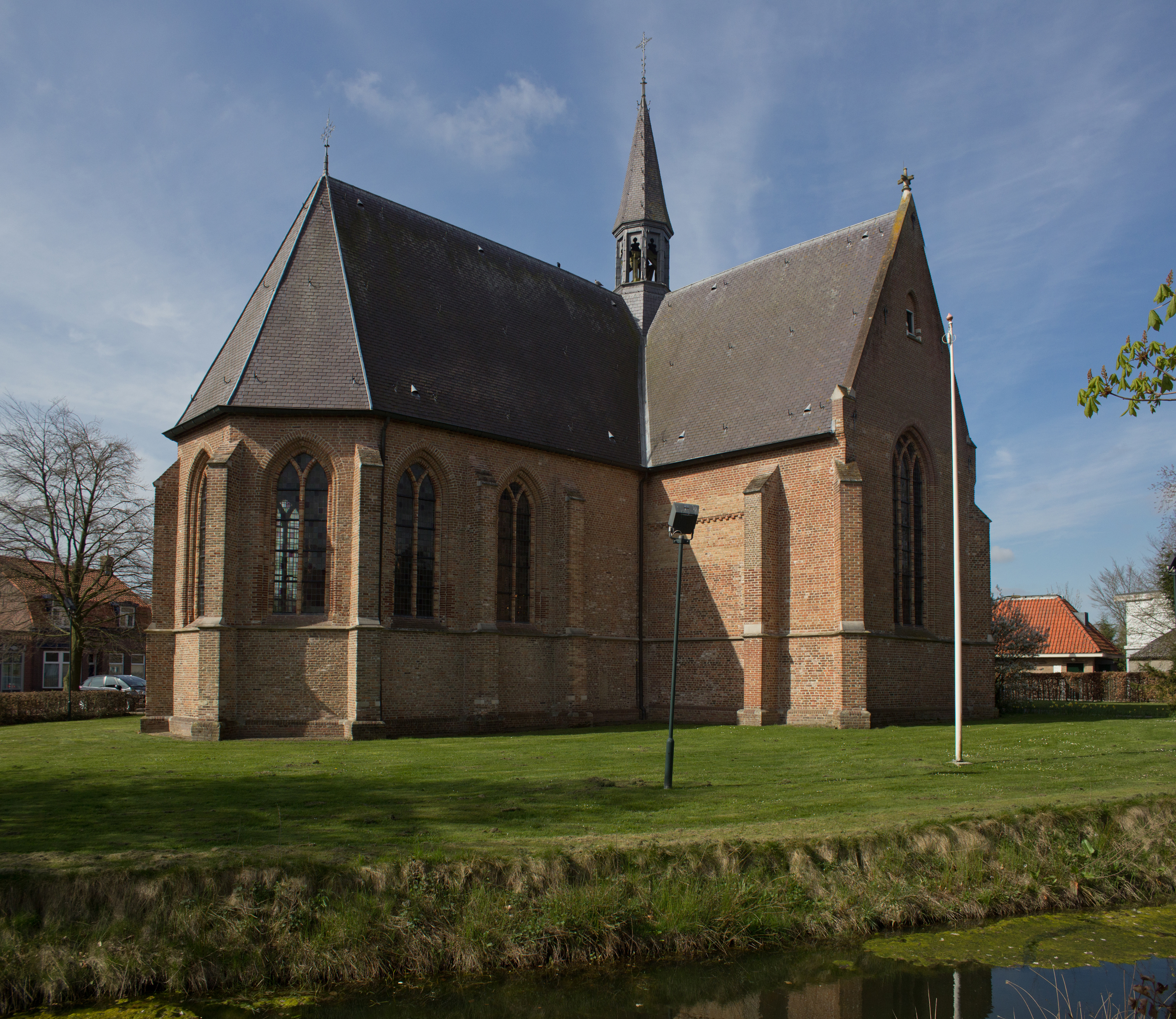
Chaam, Ledevaert kerk

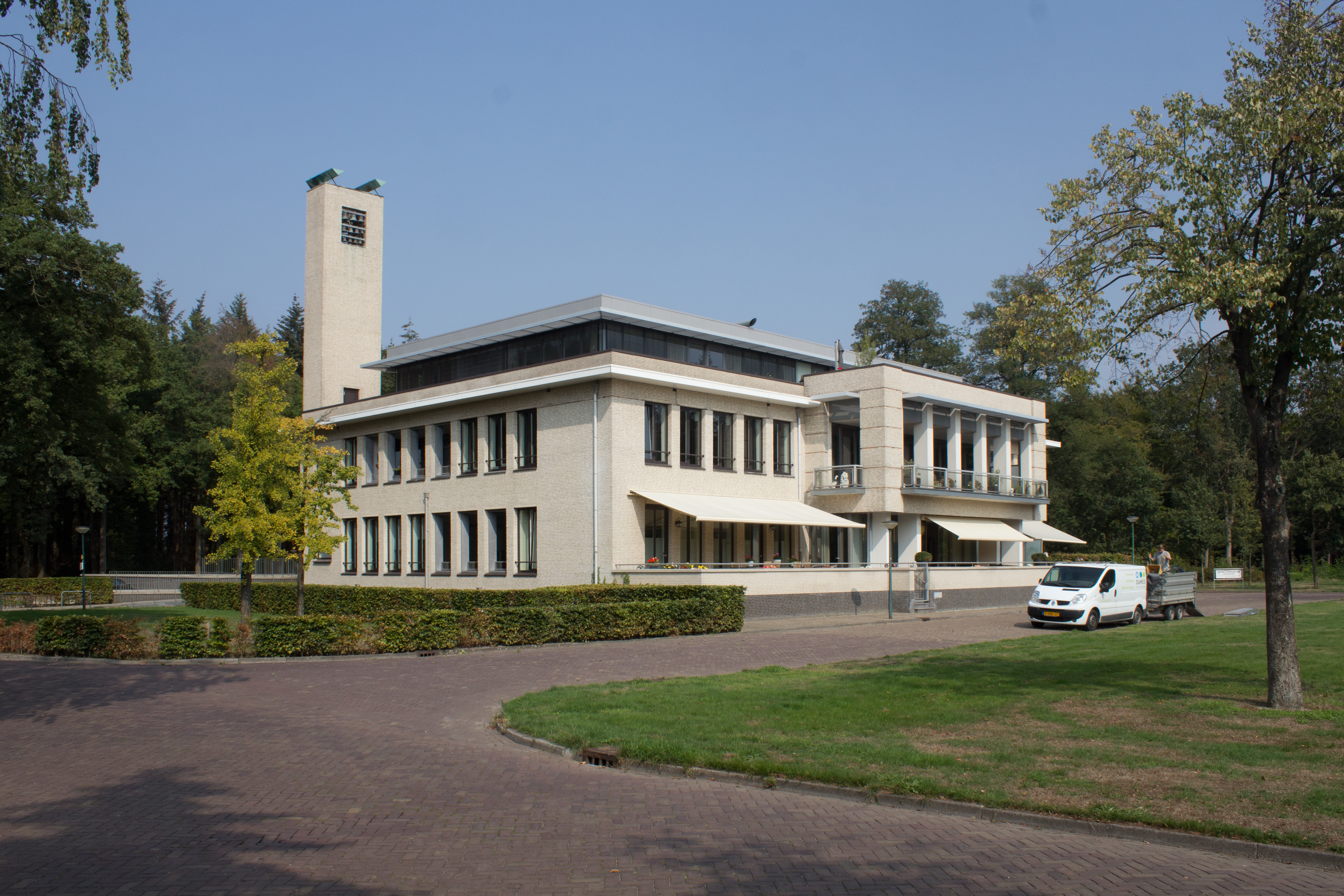
Voormalig raadhuis, Nieuw Ginneken
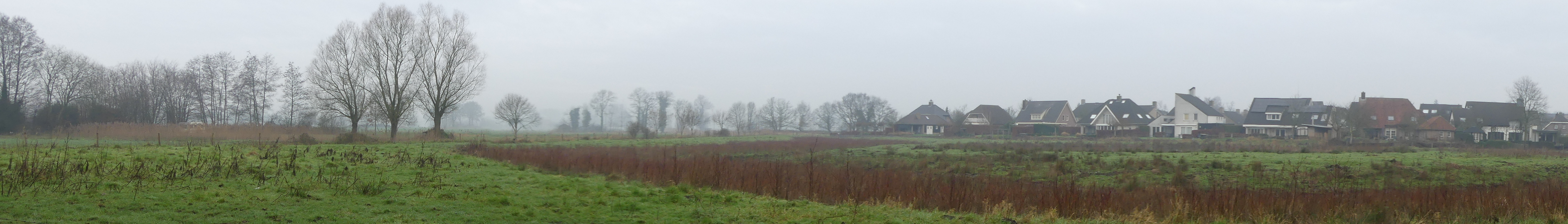
Buitengebied Chaam
