= Het Sas, North Brabant =

Village in North Brabant, Netherlands

Het Sas
- Hamlet
- Location in the province of Gelderland in the Netherlands Het Sas (Netherlands)
- Coordinates: 51°28′10″N 4°59′5″E
- Country: Netherlands
- Province: North Brabant
- Municipality: Alphen-Chaam
- Time zone: UTC+1 (CET)
  - Summer (DST): UTC+2 (CEST)
- Postal code: 5131
- Dialing code: 013

Het Sas (Dutch pronunciation: [(ɦ)ət ˈsɑs]) is a hamlet in the municipality Alphen-Chaam in the Dutch province of North Brabant. It is located southwest of Alphen.

Het Sas is not a statistical entity, and the postal authorities have placed it under Alphen. It was first mentioned in 1838 as Het Sas, and means sluice in the river Leije. The hamlet consists of about 15 houses.

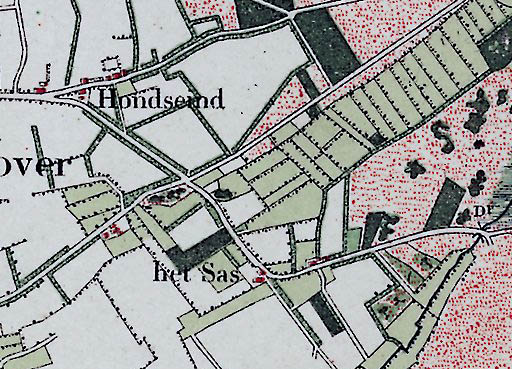
Het Sas on a 1899 map
