= Ruud de Moor =

Dutch sociologist

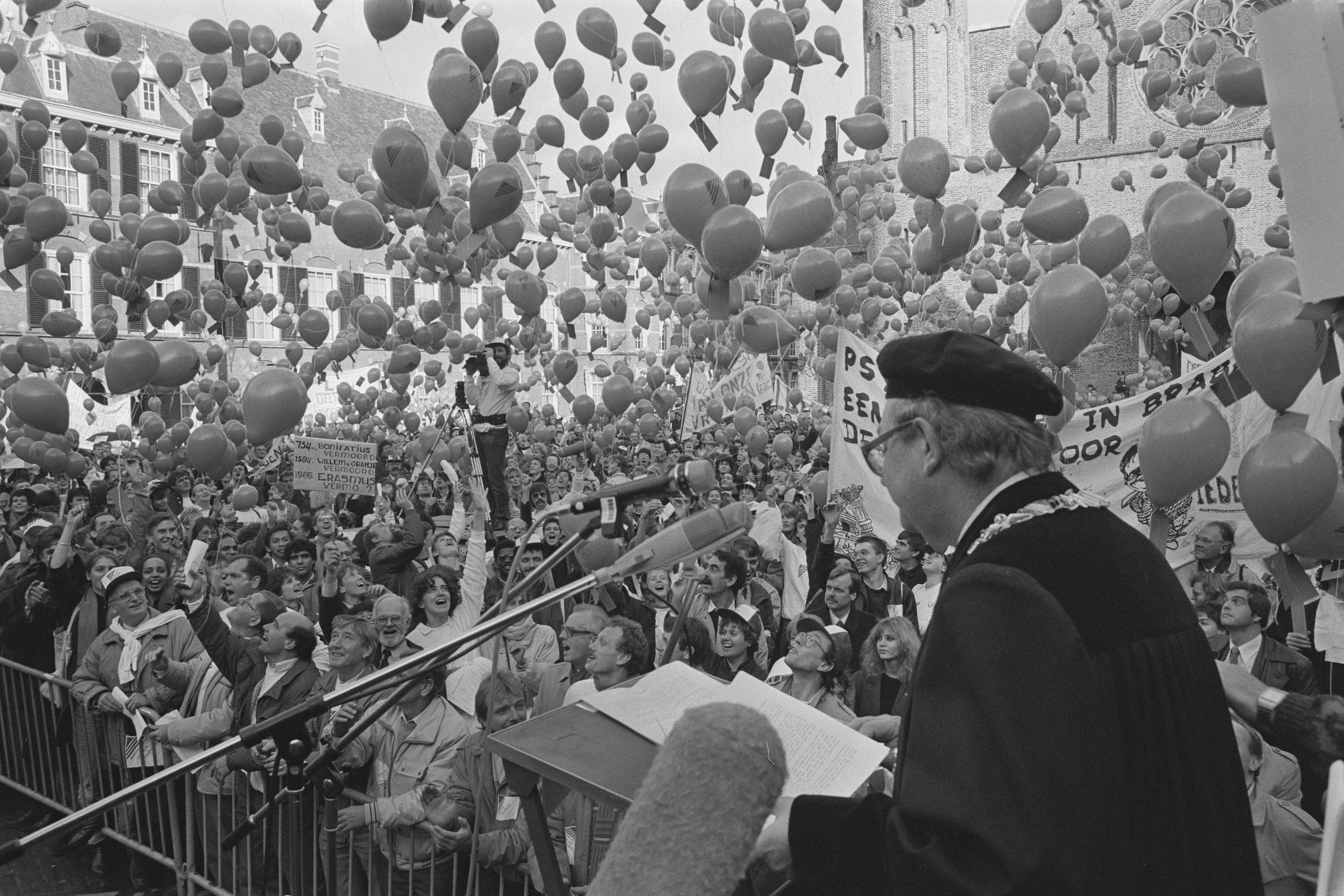
De Moor (1986)

Ruud Alphons de Moor (6 April 1928 in Chaam – 3 March 2001 in Tilburg) was a Dutch professor of sociology linked to the University of Tilburg and the Open University in the Netherlands.

With Jan Kerkhofs he started the European Values Study which later grew out to become the World Values Survey.

The Ruud de Moor centrum (RdMC) of the Open University in the Netherlands was named after him being a founder and in honour of his influence on reform of higher education in the Netherlands.
