= Strijbeek =

- Village
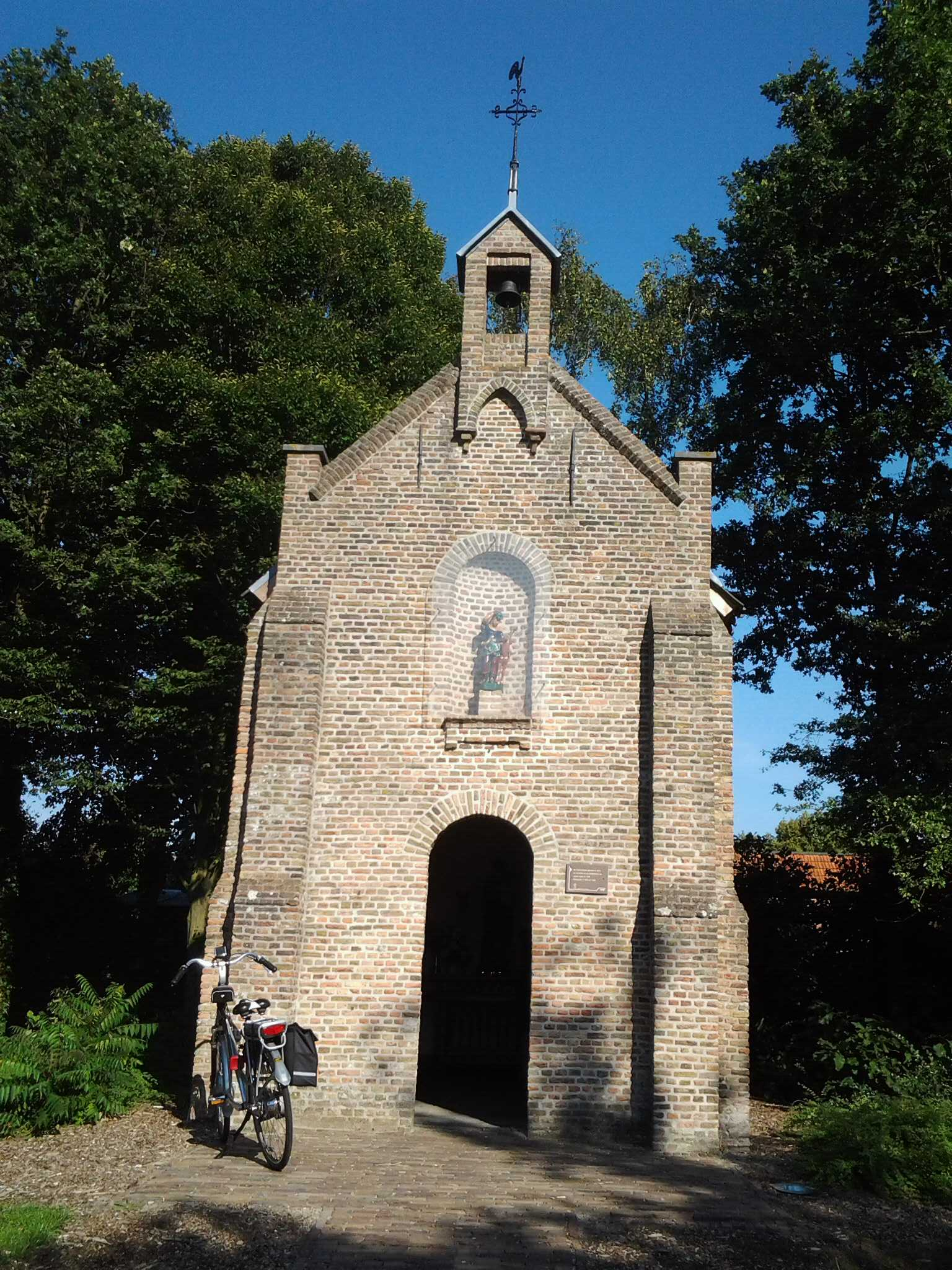
- Chapel of St. Hubertus

- Flag Coat of arms

- Location in the province of North Brabant in the Netherlands Strijbeek (Netherlands)
- Coordinates: 51°30′05″N 4°47′49″E
- Country: Netherlands
- Province: North Brabant
- Municipality: Alphen-Chaam

Area
  - Total: 9.48 km^{2} (3.66 sq mi)
- Elevation: 5.9 m (19 ft)
- Highest elevation: 6.8 m (22 ft)
- Lowest elevation: 4.2 m (14 ft)

Population (2023)
  - Total: 335
  - Density: 35.3/km^{2} (91.5/sq mi)
- Time zone: UTC+1 (CET)
  - Summer (DST): UTC+2 (CEST)
- Postal code: 4856
- Dialing code: 076

Strijbeek is a village in the Dutch province of North Brabant. It is located in the municipality of Alphen-Chaam 11 km south of the city of Breda.

== History ==
The name Strijbeek could come from Strijdbeek, or a brook that was fought over. Curiously, the brook to which Strijbeek owes its name is today known as Strijbeekse Beek.

The area around Strijbeek has long been inhabited. In 1937, an urn field was found from the Marne culture, dating to the 5th century B.C. Present-day Strijbeek probably originated in the 13th century as a stream valley settlement. Here the Oude Bredase Baan joined the connecting road between Hoogstraten and Breda. Despite this favourable location, the village never really developed.

== Demographics ==
As demonstrated in this table below, the biggest age group in Strijbeek is middle-aged adults (aged 45-65).

Age distribution in Strijbeek
Age group	Population	Percentage
0-15	30	9.1%
15-25	30	9.1%
25-45	60	18.2%
45-65	120	27.3%
65+	90	36.4%

91,2% of residents are born in the Netherlands, 8,8% are foreign-born residents.

33,3% of foreign-born residents are born outside of Europe, 66,7% are born inside of Europe.

== Gallery ==
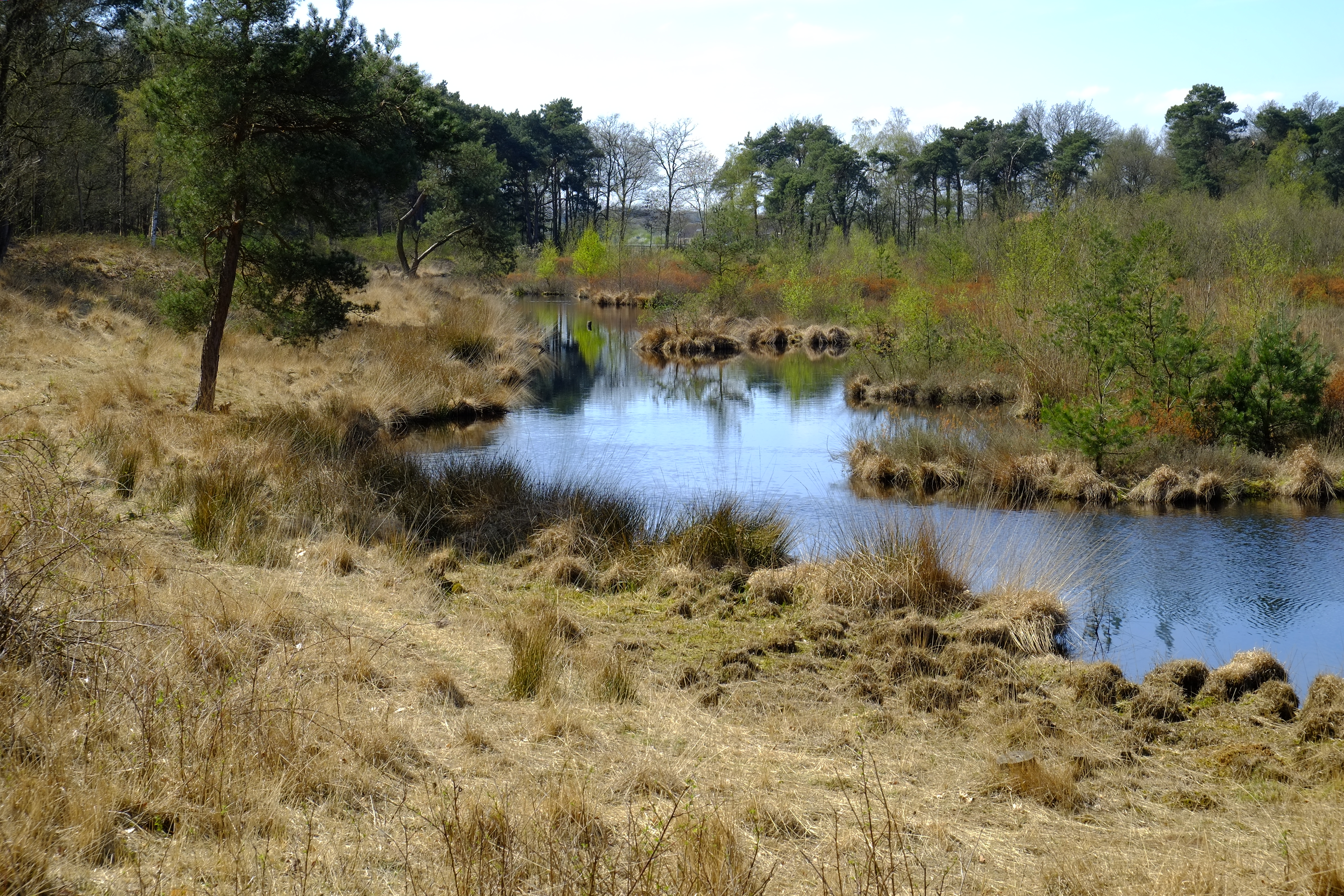
Strijbeek Heath
