= 't Zand, Alphen-Chaam =

't Zand
- Hamlet
- Location in the province of Gelderland in the Netherlands 't Zand (Netherlands)
- Coordinates: 51.49543°N 4.95707°E
- Country: Netherlands
- Province: North Brabant
- Municipality: Alphen-Chaam

Area
  - Total: 0.71 km^{2} (0.27 sq mi)
- Elevation: 24 m (79 ft)

Population (2021)
  - Total: 170
  - Density: 240/km^{2} (620/sq mi)
- Time zone: UTC+1 (CET)
  - Summer (DST): UTC+2 (CEST)
- Postal code: 5131
- Dialing code: 013

't Zand (Dutch pronunciation: [(ə)t ˈsɑnt]) is a hamlet in the Dutch province of North Brabant, in the municipality of Alphen-Chaam.

It was first mentioned in 1980 and means sand. 't Zand is a villa ward and recreational site near Alphen. There are no place name signs. It consists of about 100 houses excluding the holiday homes.

In 1939, a little chapel dedicated to Saint Willibrord was erected on the Oude Maastrichtsebaan in 't Zand. According to legend, Willibrord baptised people from Alphen near a well and it turned into a site of pilgrimage. Father Binck together with the archaeologist Joan Willems set out to find the spot and discovered a 2.5 metres (8 ft 2 in) loam well in the forest. It was restored in stone and a chapel was built on top of the well. The chapel was destroyed in 1945, and rebuilt in 1946.
