= Klooster (surname) =

Klooster is both a Dutch and Estonian toponymic surname, both meaning "monastery, cloister". Among the Dutch variant forms are ten Klooster, Van Clooster, van der Klooster, and van ('t) Klooster, each meaning "at/from (the) monastery". People with these surnames include:

- Dirk van 't Klooster (born 1976), Dutch baseball player
- Johan ten Klooster (1873–1940), Dutch graphic artist and painter, father of Philip
- Kees-Jan van der Klooster (born 1977), Dutch Paralympic snowboarder
- Milton Klooster (born 1996), Dutch football forward, twin brother of Rodney
- Noël Van Clooster (born 1943), Belgian racing cyclist
- Philip ten Klooster (1909–1969), Dutch sculptor and draughtsman, son of Johan
- Rigard van Klooster (born 1989), Dutch track racing cyclist and speed skater
- Rodney Klooster (born 1996), Dutch football defender, twin brother of Milton
- Ton van Klooster (born 1954), Dutch freestyle swimmer
- William Klooster (born 1957), Dutch ice hockey player
