= Chaam =

- Village
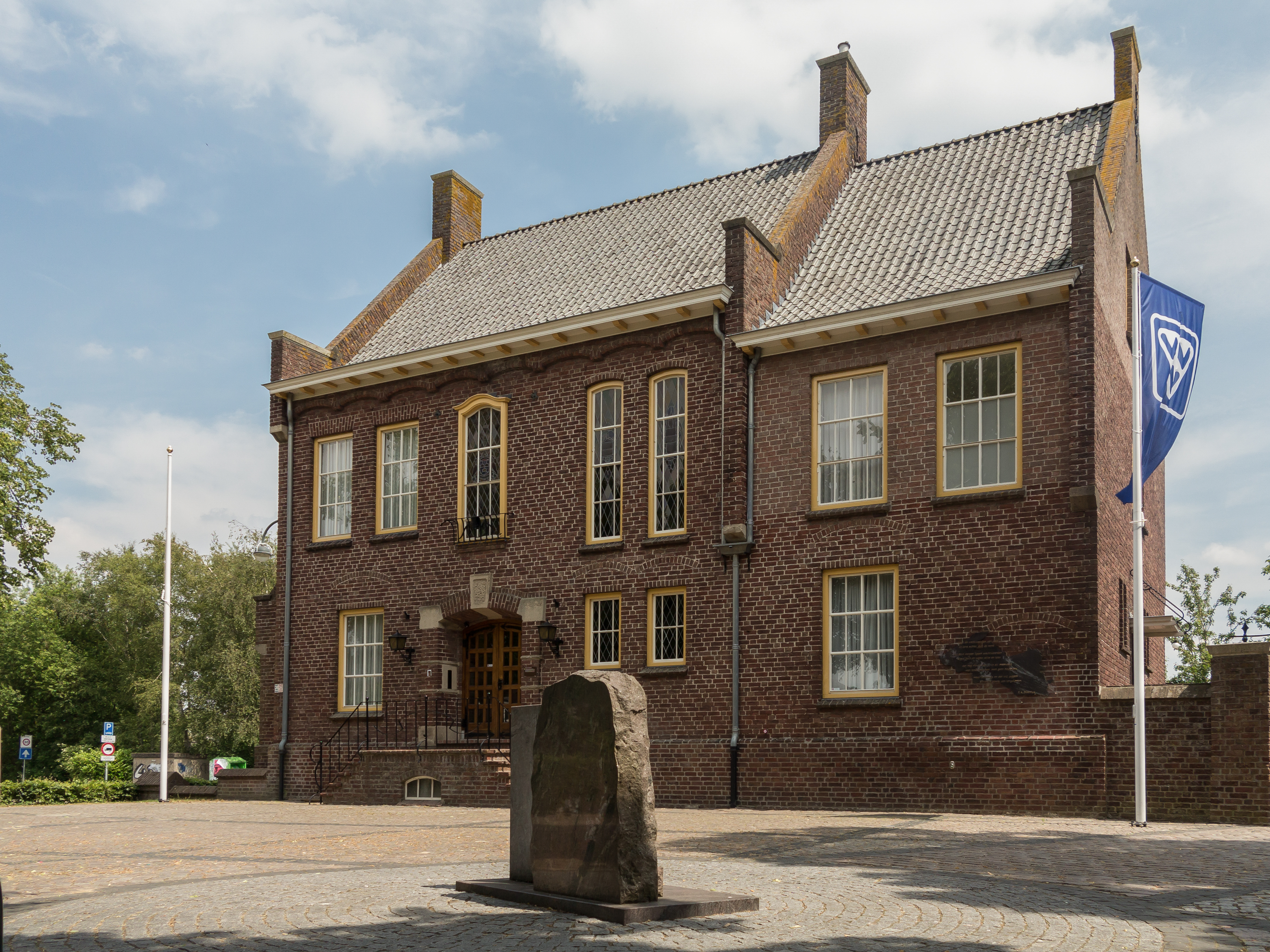
- Town hall

- Flag Coat of arms

- Location within North Brabant Location within Netherlands
- Coordinates: 51°30′16″N 4°51′41″E
- Country: Netherlands
- Province: North Brabant
- Municipality: Alphen-Chaam

Area
  - Total: 29.87 km^{2} (11.53 sq mi)
- Elevation: 13 m (43 ft)

Population (2021)
  - Total: 4,295
  - Density: 143.8/km^{2} (372.4/sq mi)
- Time zone: UTC+1 (CET)
  - Summer (DST): UTC+2 (CEST)
- Postal code: 4861
- Dialing code: 0161

Chaam (Dutch pronunciation: [kaːm]) is a village in the Dutch province of North Brabant. It is located in the municipality of Alphen-Chaam, about 13 km southeast of Breda.

== History ==
The village was first mentioned in 1236 as "de Cambe", and probably means beer brewery. Chaam is a road village which developed in the Middle Ages.

The Dutch Reformed church was a gothic church from the 16th century. After the destruction on 28 October 1944 by the Germans, only a part was reconstructed. Of the richly decorated tower, only the pear-shared spire and the bell from 1392 could be saved, and a new tower could not be financed; however, it has been placed next to the church. The Catholic Saint Anthony Abt was built in 1925 and 1926. Its tower was blown up in 1944 as well. It was restored and enlarged in 1948, and has been made to resemble the tower of the Dutch Reformed church.

Before the Belgian Revolution (1830-1831), Chaam was the geographic centre of the Kingdom of the Netherlands. It was home to 396 people in 1840. Chaam was a separate municipality until 1997, when it was merged with Alphen.

== Demographics ==
As demonstrated in this table below, the biggest age group of Chaam are middle-aged adults (aged 45-65).

Age distribution of Chaam
| Age group | Population | Percentage |
|---|---|---|
| 0-15 | 585 | 13.6% |
| 15-25 | 430 | 10% |
| 25-45 | 825 | 19.2% |
| 45-65 | 1225 | 28.5% |
| 65+ | 1200 | 27.9% |

92% of residents are born in the Netherlands, 8% are foreign-born residents.

36,8% of foreign-born residents are from outside of Europe, 62,2% are from inside of Europe.

== Facilities ==
Chaam has 2 supermarkets; PLUS and Lidl. Chaam also has 2 other retailers, Action and Kruidvat.

Chaam has 2 elementary schools, De Driesprong and Het Beekdal.

Chaam also has a GP called Nugteren-Meijler.

Chaam also has a fire station.

== Transportation ==
Chaam is connected by bus 375 with Breda railway station and Baarle-Nassau. It's also connected by bus 175 with Ulicoten.

== Sport ==
Chaam organises annually on the first Wednesday after the Tour de France, the Acht van Chaam, a cycling criterium for professional cyclists.

Chaam also has a football club called VV Chaam.

== Gallery ==
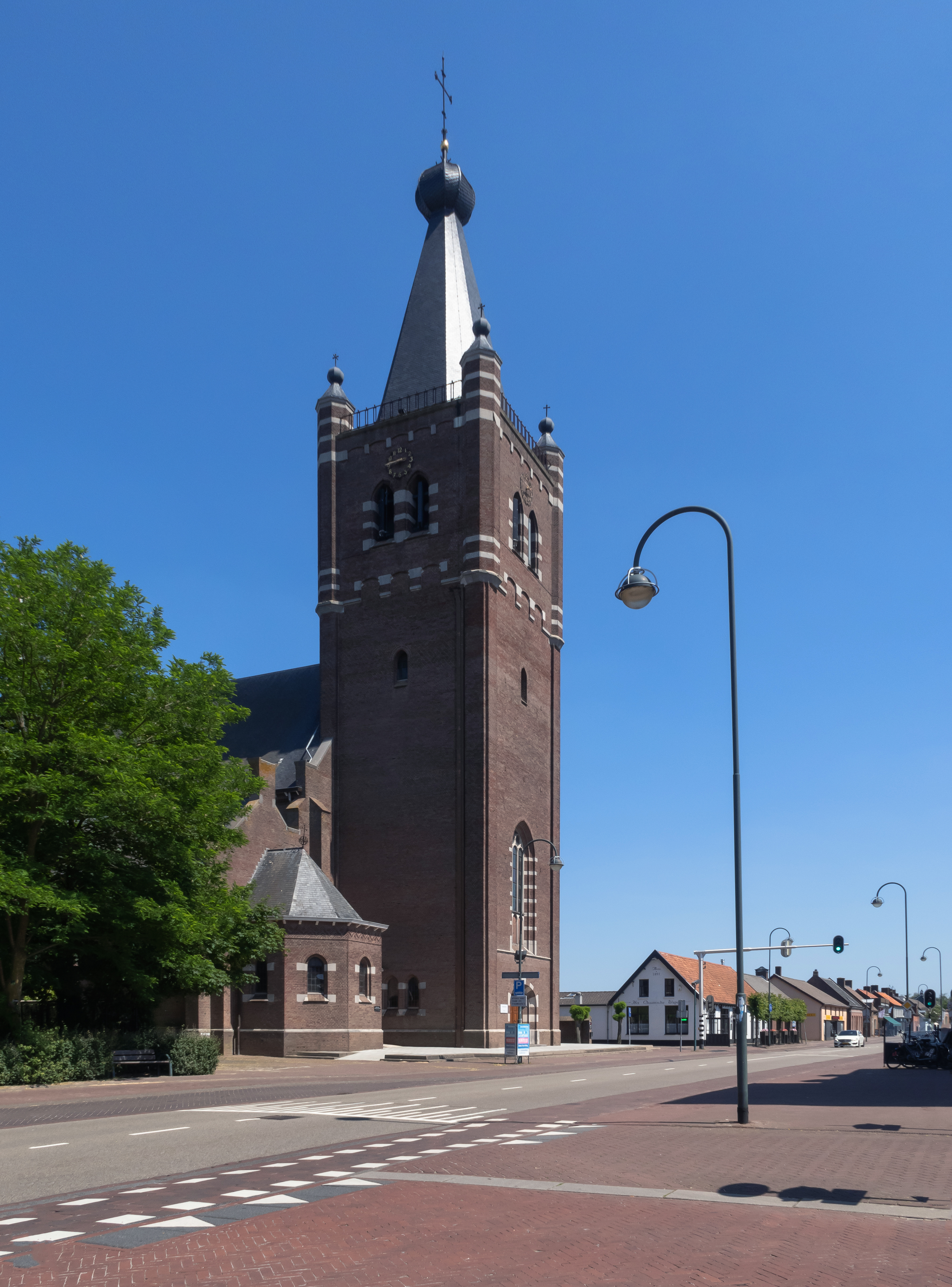
Catholic church: Saint Anthony Abt

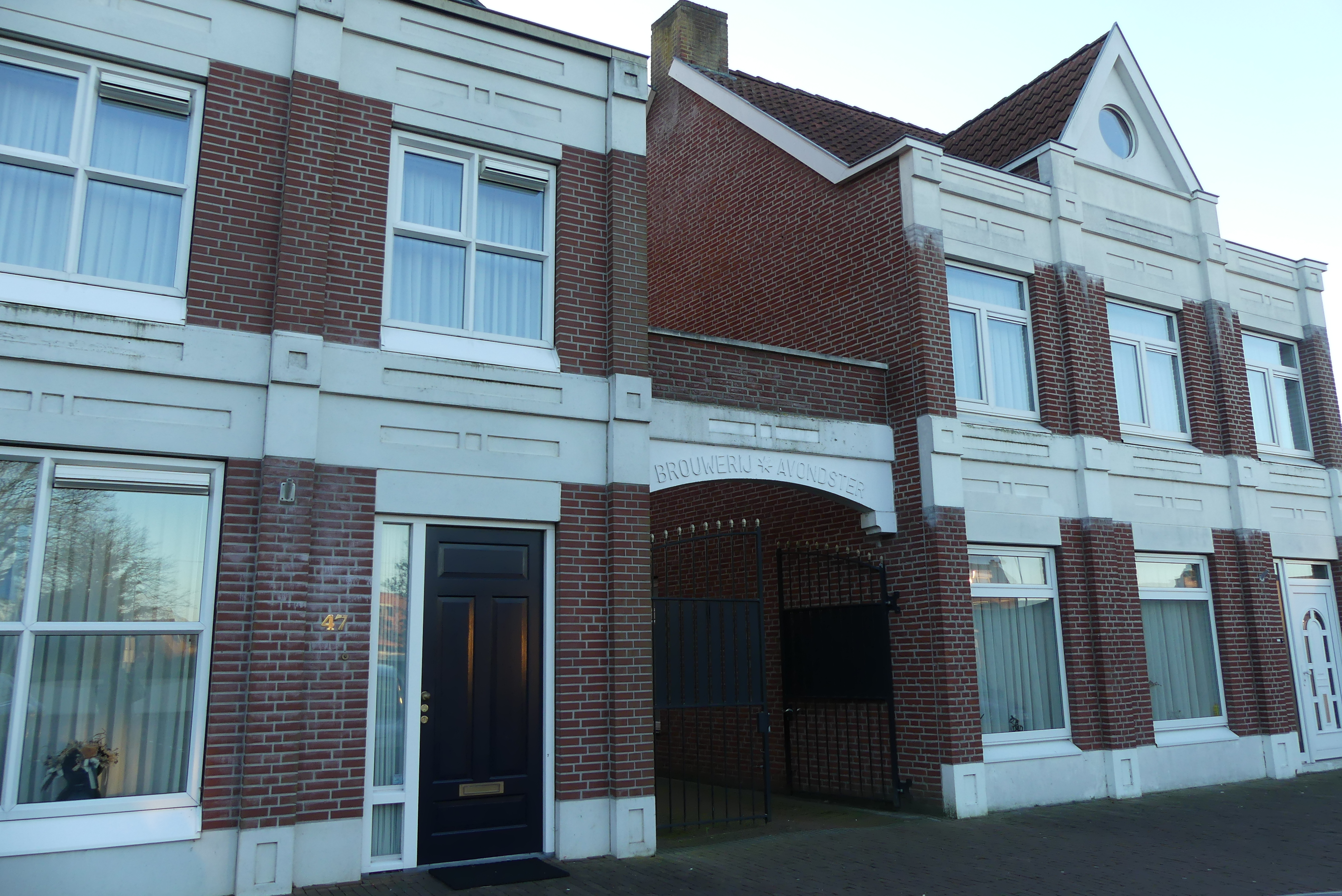
Brewery of Chaam

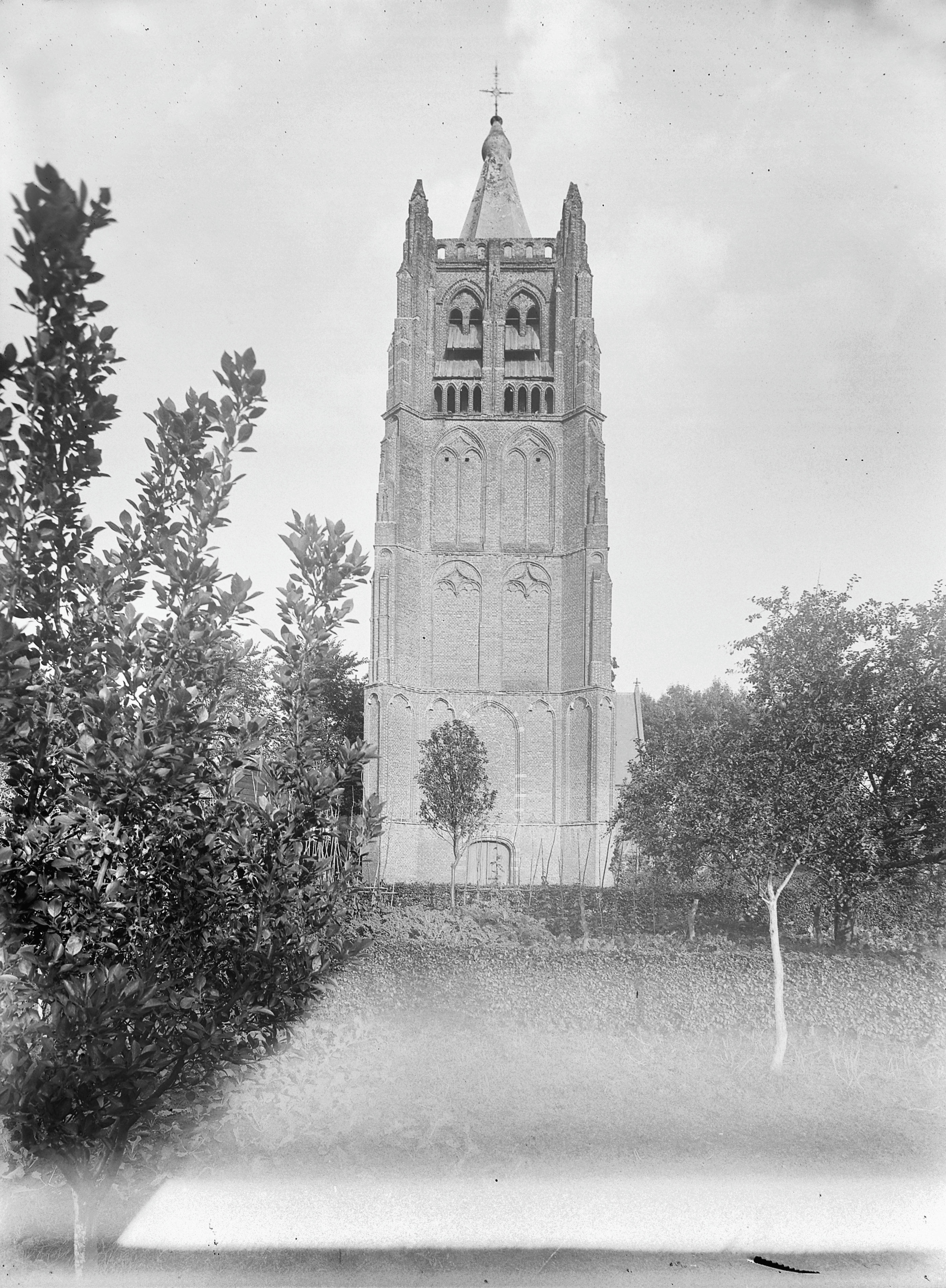
Former tower of the Dutch Reformed church (1907)

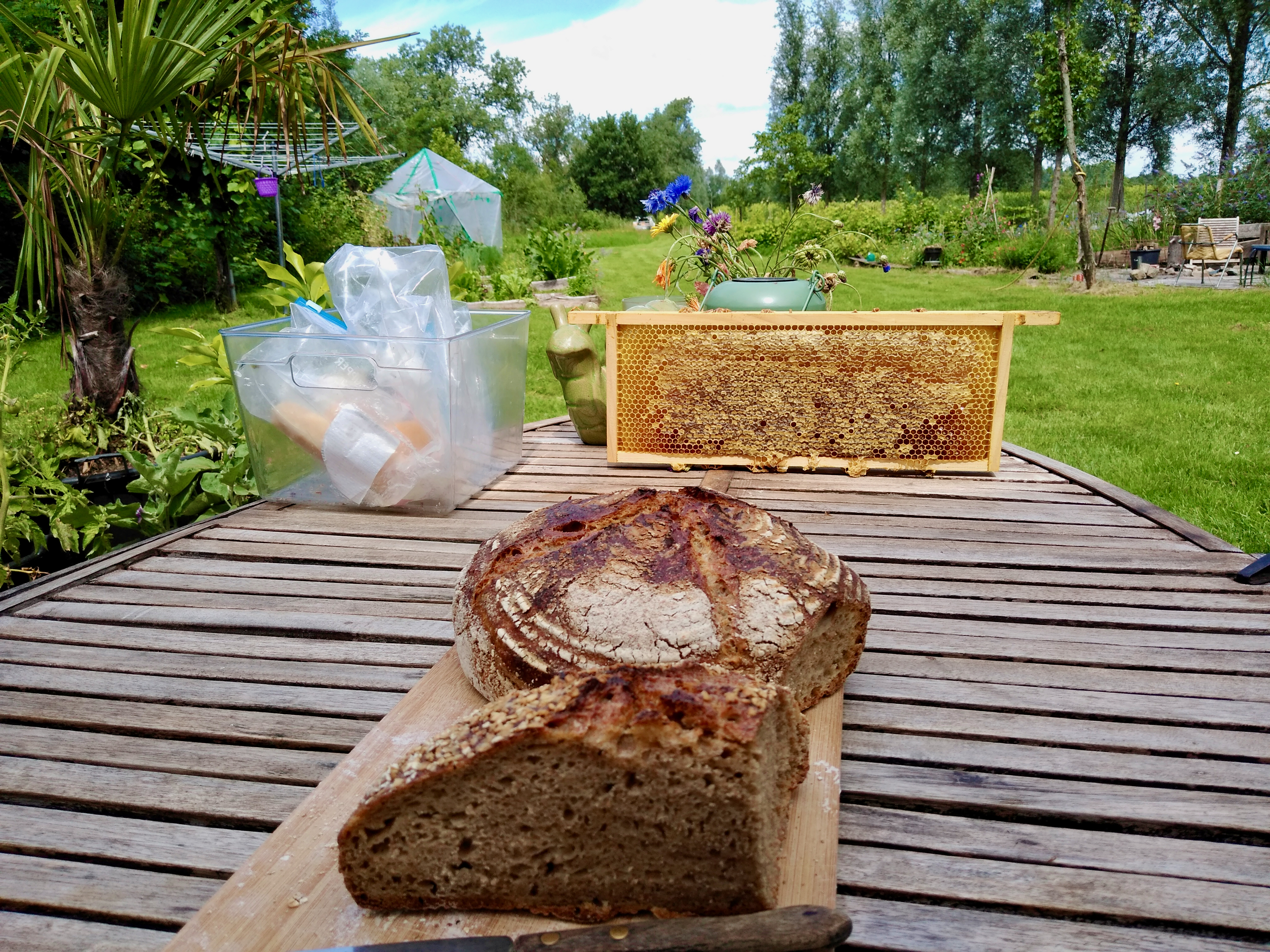
Vineyard in Chaam
