= Esschestroom =

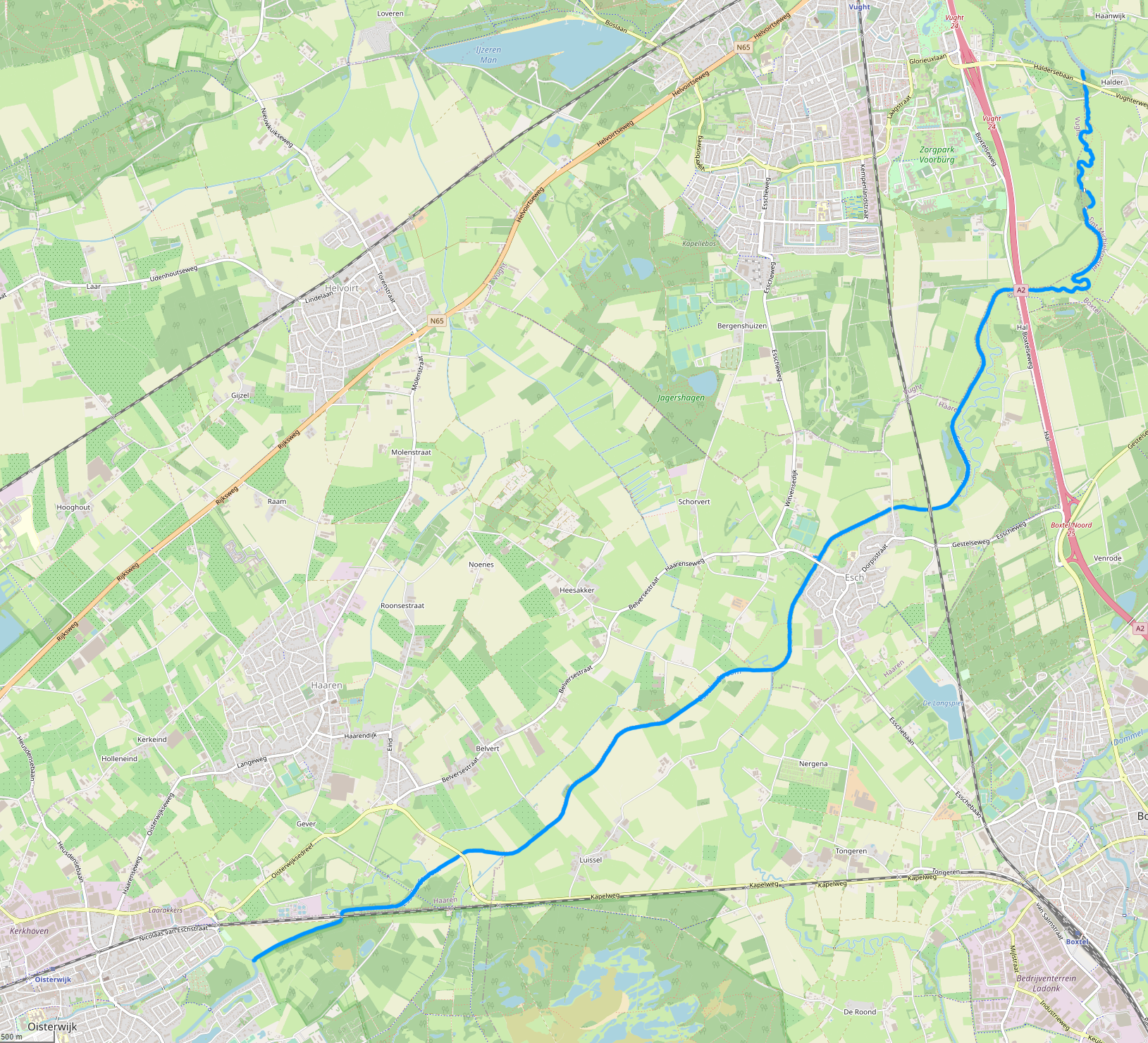
- Location map of the Esschestroom.

Location
- Countries: Netherlands

Physical characteristics
- Source
  - location: Oisterwijk
  - coordinates: 51.582961°N 5.218252°E
- Mouth
  - location: Dommel
  - coordinates: 51.650102°N 5.319316°E
- Length: 7 km (4.3 mi)

The Esschestroom, also Essche Stroom is a small river near Esch in North Brabant

== Name ==
The Esschestroom is also called Essche Stroom, which is a mere matter of spelling. Another name is 'Run' which is a very common name for brooks. This can lead to confusion with the Run near Veldhoven. In medieval times the Esschestroom and some of the upstream water was called Dieze.

== Geography ==
The Esschestroom is about 7 km long. Just east of Oisterwijk it is formed by the confluence of the Voorste Stroom and the Reusel, which is locally called Achterste Stroom. Downstream it is joined by the Rosep, the Nemer, and just before Esch by the Kleine Aa or Dommeltje. The Esschestroom then flows through Esch and joins the Dommel just west of Halder.

== History ==
The river was canalized in 1965. Many meanders and kolks that used to store excess water were filled up during this operation. The clock kolk (Klockwiel) was filled up with waste from the village (which?). In time the river got the nickname 'Dirty Stream' because of all the local industry that polluted the river.

== Ecology ==
In the first decade of the 21st century there was a plague of the floating pennywort in the Esschestroom. In the Netherlands it is foreign, invasive, and tends to clog up waterways.

In 2005 a plan was made to restore the water storage capacity, the ecological and the recreational values of the Essche Stroom. It became a very large project that is still active in 2020. Some of the constituent projects have already been completed. Some of these projects led to re-opening filled meanders of the Esschestroom. Other projects targeted the migration of fish and frogs.

One of these projects was the project Halsche Beemden, finished in 2014. It brought back about three kilometers of meanders between the highway A2 and the railway from Boxtel to 's-Hertogenbosch. Furthermore, ponds were created for amphibian life. The canalized Esschestroom stayed in place for storing excess water, and the area east of the new meanders would be allowed to flood in case of emergency. The new natural reserve that was thus created soon attracted plants, fish and wildlife. The project also created facilities for hiking and canoeing.

Further north the project Levendig Bleijendijk was finished in 2015. Here the canalized Esschestroom itself was rerouted, so it meandered again over 2.5 km. The dykes were moved further from the shore, and made place for lower waterlines which were allowed to flood. From 2015 visitors were welcomed to the area.

== Gallery ==
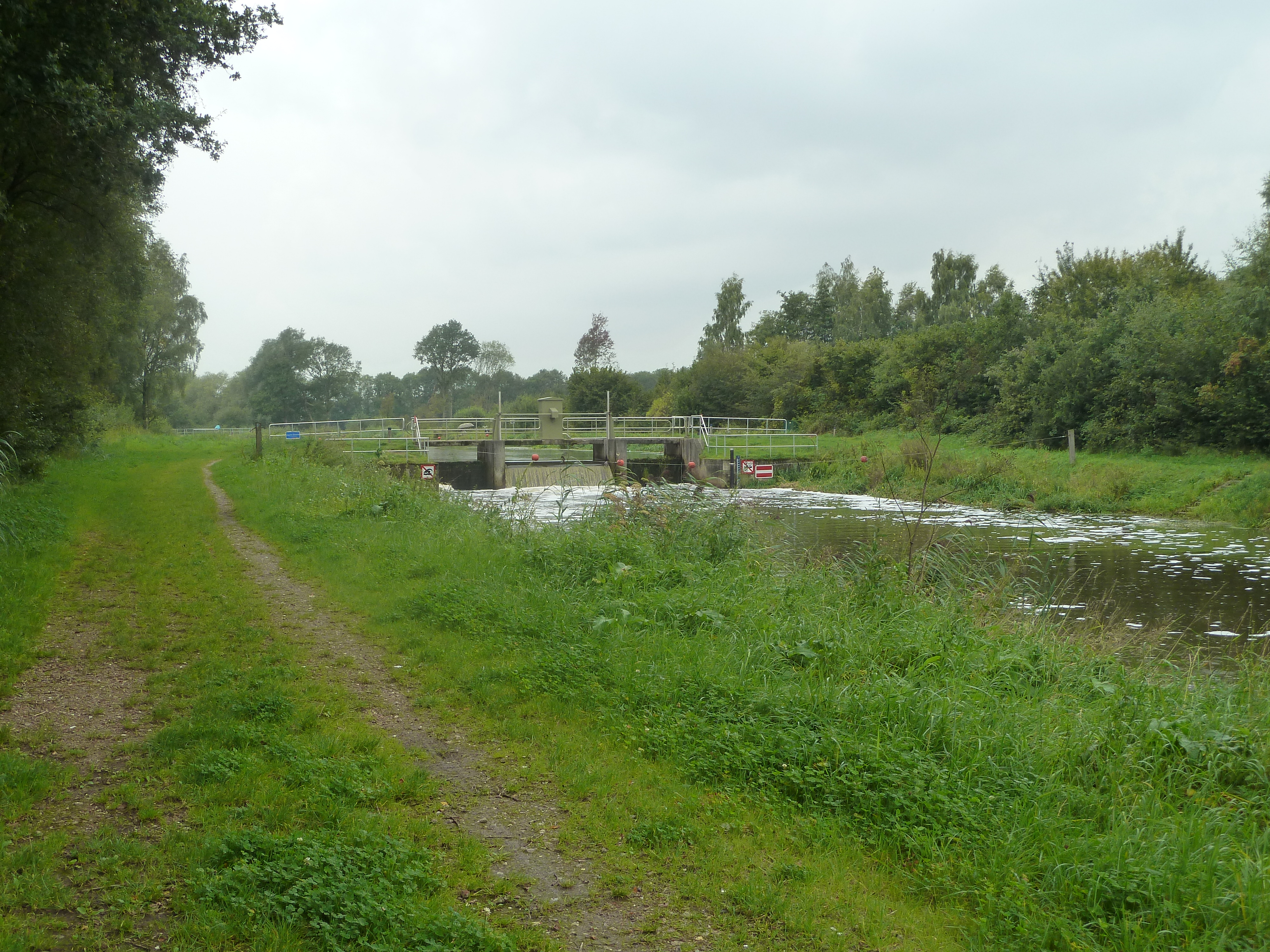
Sluice in the Esschestroom viewed upstream near Nemerlaer Castle in Haaren.

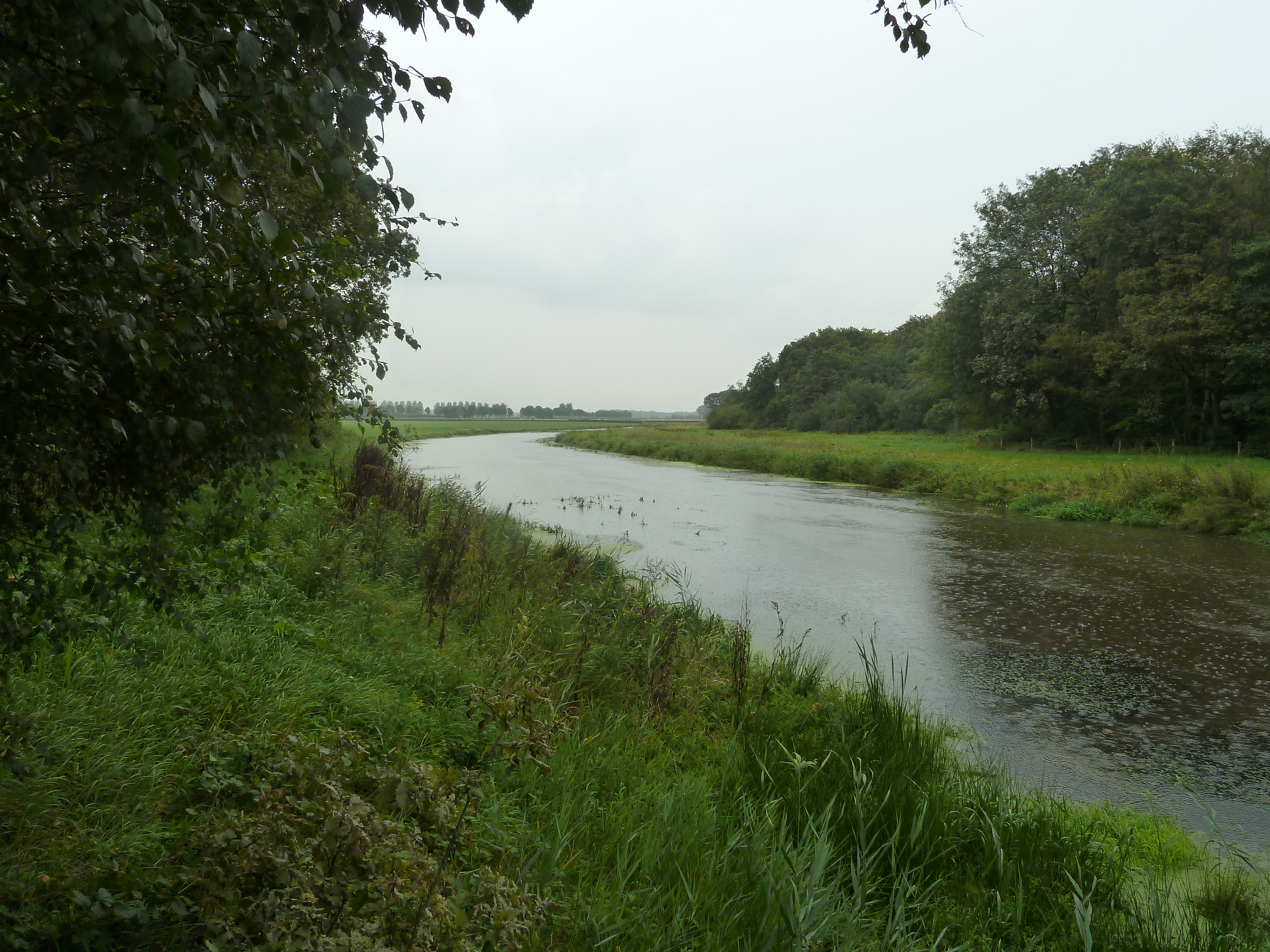
Esschestroom viewed downstream near Nemerlaer Castle in Haaren.

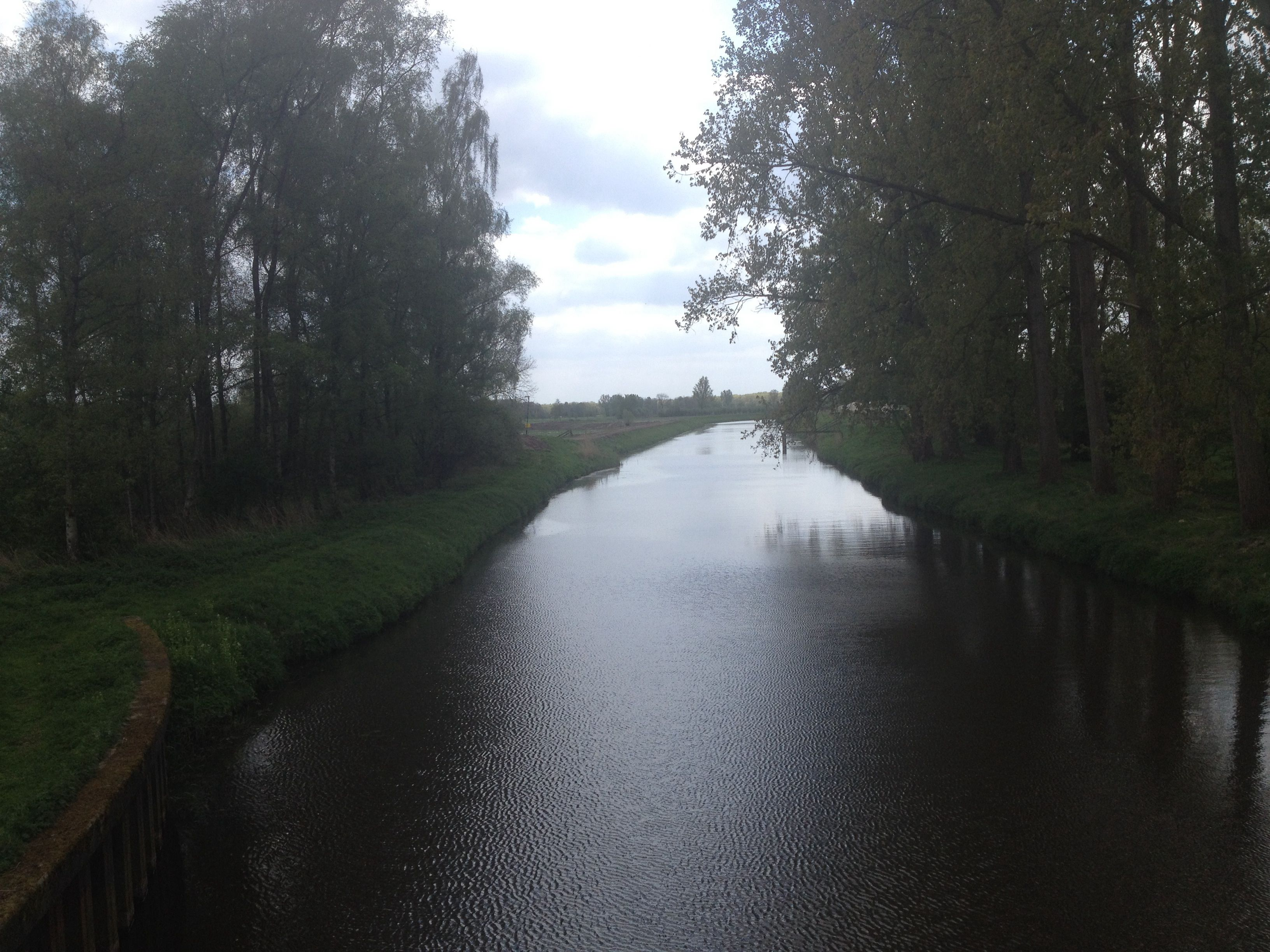
Esschestroom near Halder.
