= Heers, Netherlands =

Hamlet in North Brabant province, Netherlands

Coordinates: 51°23′41″N 5°23′57″E

Heers
- Hamlet
- Interactive map of Heers
- Country: Netherlands
- Province: North Brabant
- Municipality: Veldhoven
- Time zone: UTC+1 (CET)
  - Summer (DST): UTC+2 (CEST)

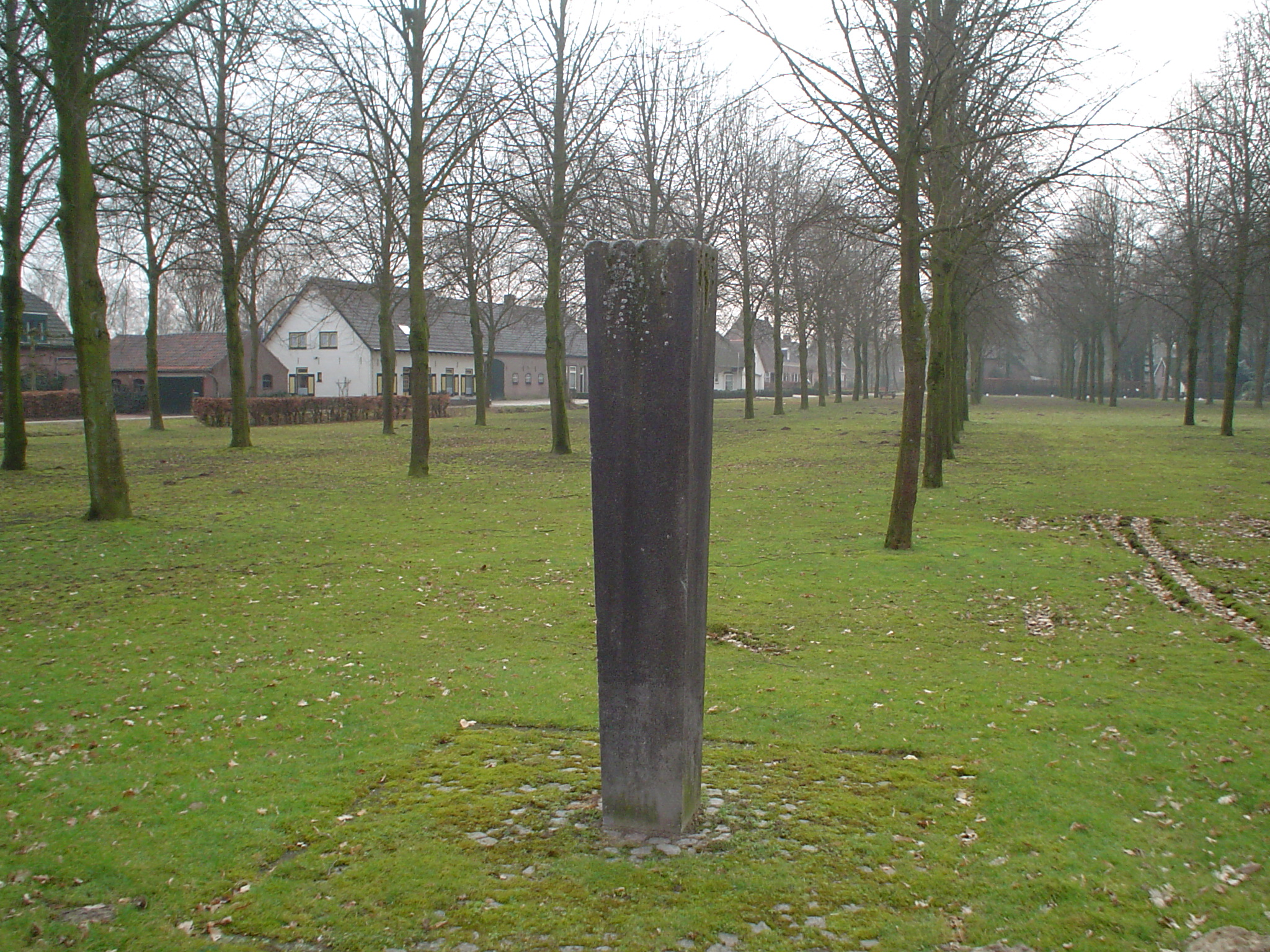
Monument for the local agricultural consolidation project

Heers is a hamlet in the south of the municipality of Veldhoven in the province of North Brabant, the Netherlands. Most of the buildings are concentrated around a town square with trees. At this town square is a chapel from 1990 located. There is also a monument, erected in 1966 for the local agricultural consolidation project. Heers has a long history. The hamlet is mentioned in books from the Middle Ages. Also, archaeological artefacts from the Bronze Age and the Roman Empire have been unearthed near the hamlet.

== Etymology ==
The hamlet was named Herle in 1297, which means forest on higher ground. In the fourteenth century it was also known under the names Heerze and Heerle, which may refer to a sandy ridge. This would be the ridge between the Run and Gender streams.

== History ==
=== Prehistory ===
The surroundings of Heers were already inhabited by humans in prehistoric times. In the woods near the road Locht, in the direction of the village Steensel, are some preserved tumuli located. The teacher and amateur archaeologist Petrus Panken was the first to report the existence of these tumuli, in 1845. He searched thirteen mounds and discovered urns filled with charcoal and cremated remains. The head teacher in Veldhoven, Cornelis Rijken, also found a great number of urns in this region in 1910. The first systematic research was conducted by Albert van Giffen in 1948. The ten tumuli that he reconstructed are known as the Group Heibloem. The tumuli are originating from a period of time between the Middle Bronze Age until the Iron Age (1500 - 50 BC).

=== Roman Empire ===
Archaeological remains from the Roman Empire were found near Heers. On May 15, 1871, the amateur archaeologist Petrus Panken recovered several fragments of small terracotta sculptures, including a nearly undamaged sculpture of Diana, the Roman goddess of the hunt. The sculpture, dated 175 AD, is 21.6 centimetres tall and portrays Diana with a quiver on her back and a dog at her side. It was donated in 1872 to the Noordbrabants Museum in 's-Hertogenbosch, where it is still preserved.

In 1909, the head teacher Cornelis Rijken recommended to conduct an official archaeological investigation into the Roman remains near Heers. This investigation was led by Jan Hendrik Holwerda, an archaeologist of the Rijksmuseum van Oudheden in Leiden, the national archaeological museum of the Netherlands. The investigation unearthed traces of a canal, as part of a Roman watchtower. This military post was probably constructed around the year 100 and further fortified around the year 200.

=== Middle Ages ===
Near the road Oeienbosdijk, northwest of Heers, was a row grave field located during the age of the Franks. This grave field was probably in use from the sixth century until the end of the seventh century. It was discovered in 1970 during the construction of the motorway A67. Twenty five graves and three burial sites were investigated.

From the Middle Ages until the beginning of the twentieth century, Heers consisted only of a few farms along the stream Run. Surrounding these farms were large moors, such as the Steenselse Heide and the Broekhovense Heide. One of these farms was the Oyvaersnest, which stands for stork nest in Old Dutch. Its premises were cultivated in 1465. This farm was located between Heers and the hamlet Heiberg. It was mentioned in archives under the name Ooievaarsnest until the eighteenth century.

=== Modern Era ===
Eight houses in Heers were destroyed by a fire on March 31, 1761. Only one house was not rebuilt. The Minister of Veldhoven bought a farm in Heers in 1829, for the purpose of renting it for little money to a Protestant family. With this action he hoped to increase the number of members in the Dutch Reformed Church of Veldhoven. The farm he bought came into the possession of the Society of Prosperity in 1836. This society also seeks to increase the number of members in the Dutch Reformed Church. The farm was designated support number 24. Heers consisted of nineteen houses near the end of the nineteenth century. The invention of fertilizer contributed to the cultivation of all surrounding moor areas at the beginning of the twentieth century.

== Geography ==
=== Topography ===
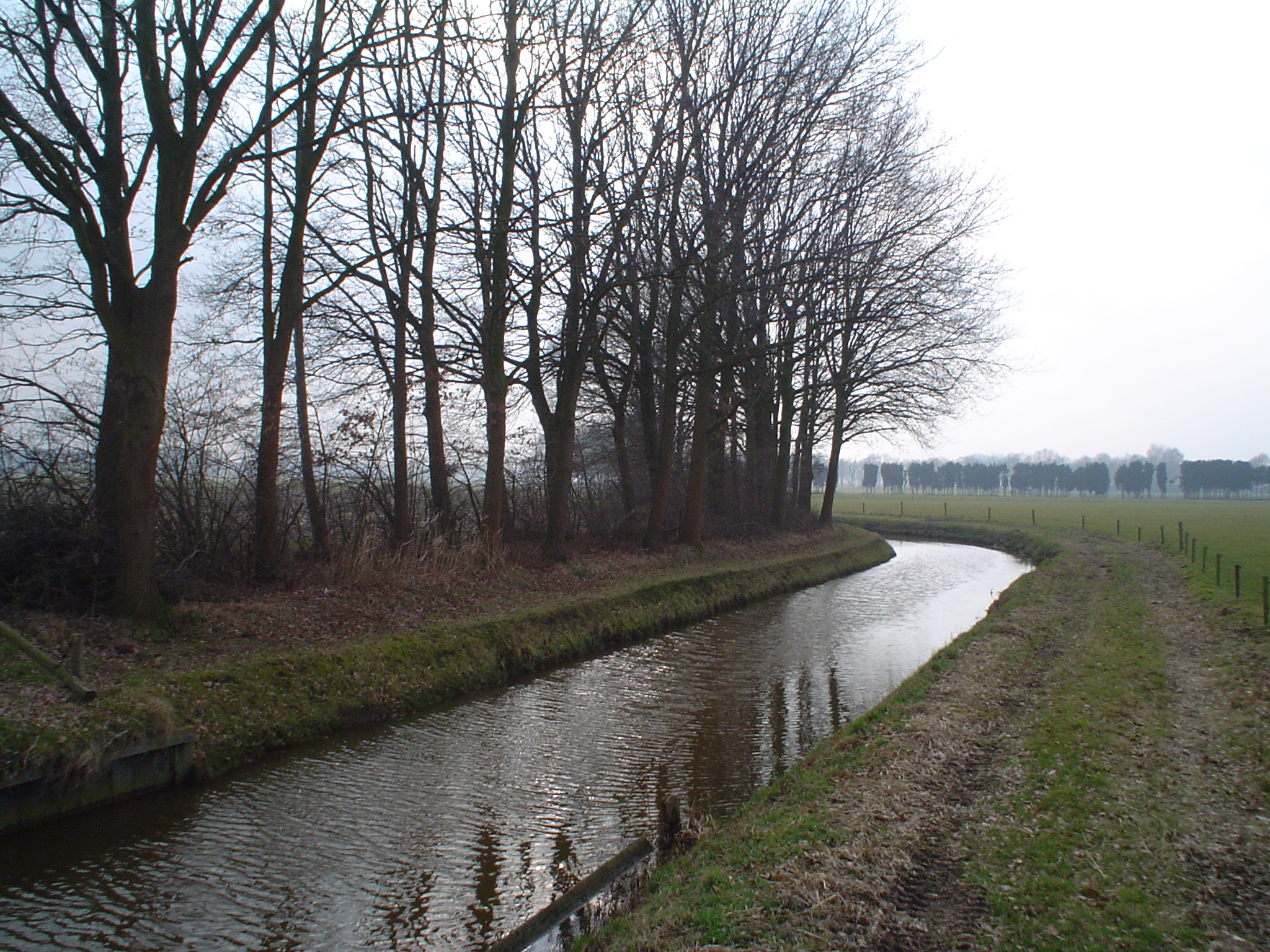
The stream Run near the Heerseweg

Heers is located one kilometre south of the residential area Veldhoven Dorp and three kilometers west of the village Waalre. Heers is the only hamlet located south of the motorway A67 within the municipality of Veldhoven. The hamlet lies at the Heerseweg, which is the main road between Veldhoven Dorp and the Volmolen watermill near Waalre.

=== Nature and landscape ===
Directly west of Heers lies the complex of the hotel and congress centre Koningshof. Here is also the forest area known as the Sprankelse Bossen located, which stretches all the way up to the village of Steensel. Ten reconstructed tumuli can be found in this forest. Part of the forest is known under the name Heersche Heide', which refers to the moor area that was present here before the land was cultivated.

East of Heers lay the swimming area and campsite 't Witven.

South of Heers are some agricultural areas situated along the stream the Run. Further south, near the road Volmolenweg, lies the nature area the Vlasroot. This area consists of two lakes and a fish-pond.

== Monuments ==
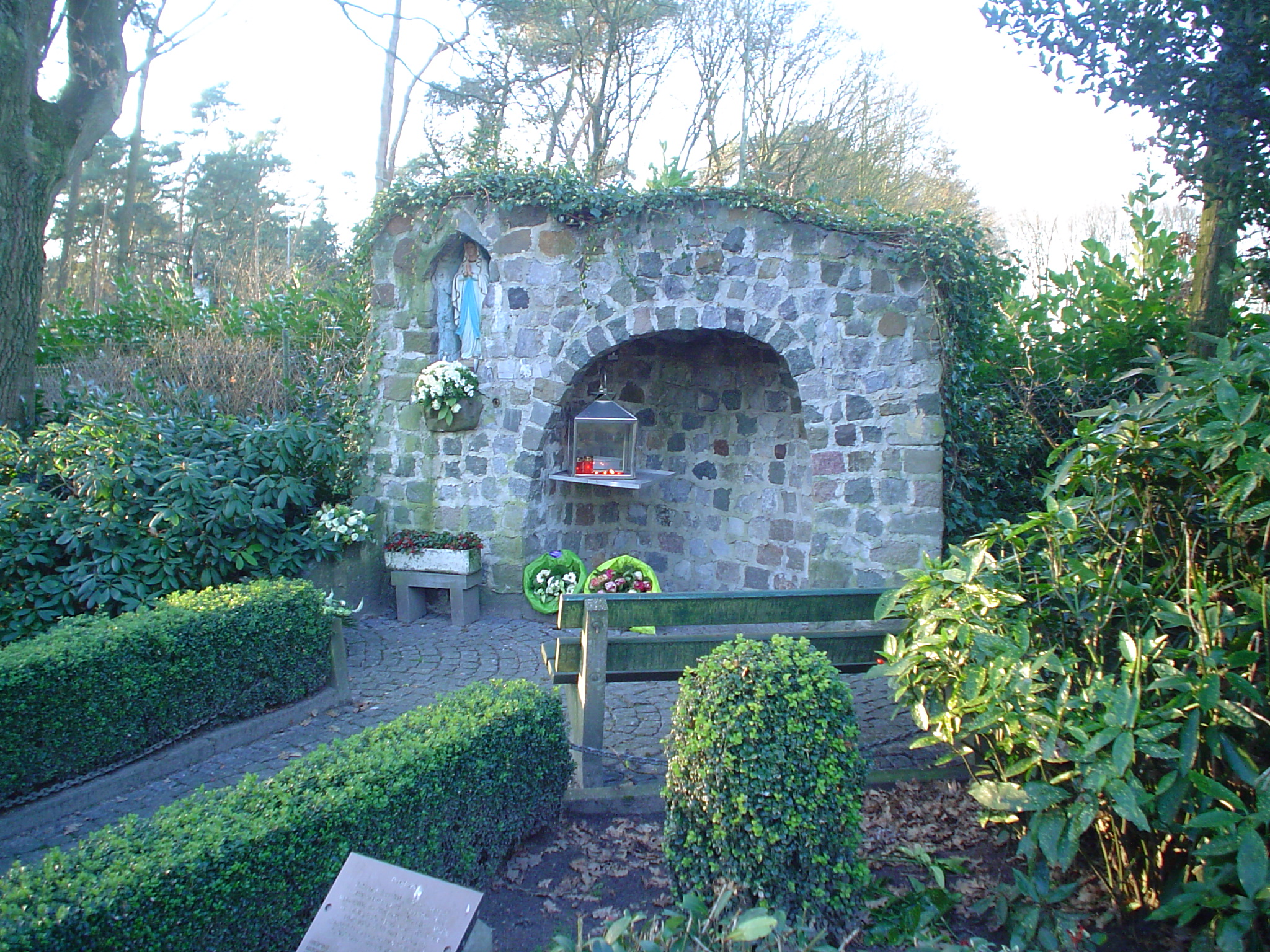
Chapel built in 1990

The chapel located at the street Westerveldseweg, dedicated to Mary, was built in 1990 by the citizen militia or schutterij St. Caecilia of the residential area Veldhoven Dorp. A Marian grotto was present on this spot from 1935 until approximately 1960.

The monument for the local agricultural consolidation project was erected on the square of Heers in 1966. It refers to the agricultural consolidation that took place here between 1960 and 1965. What triggered the consolidation was the construction of the motorway A67, which crossed many plots north of Heers. The stream the Run was engineered and all the plots along the stream were also consolidated in the process.
