= Dommel =

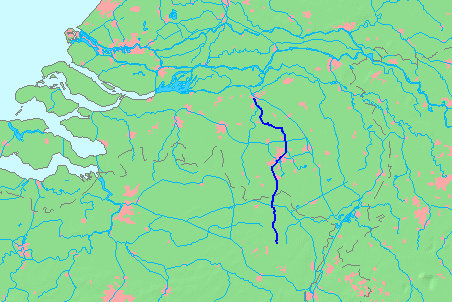
- Location map of the Dommel.

Location
- Countries: Belgium, Netherlands

Physical characteristics
- Source
  - location: Campine
- Mouth
  - location: Dieze
  - coordinates: 51°41′42″N 5°18′3″E
- Length: 120 km (75 mi)

Basin features
- Progression: Dieze→ Meuse→ North Sea

The Dommel is a small river in Belgium and the Netherlands, left tributary of the Dieze. It is 120 km long, of which 85 km are in the Netherlands. The Dommel takes in water from the Keersop, Tongelreep, Run, Gender and Kleine Dommel streams and merges at 's-Hertogenbosch with the Aa stream to form the river Dieze, which subsequently flows towards the Meuse. The main cities and towns along the Dommel's course are Peer, Neerpelt, Valkenswaard, Dommelen, Eindhoven, Son en Breugel, Sint-Oedenrode, Boxtel, Sint-Michielsgestel and 's-Hertogenbosch.

== Drainage basin ==
The drainage basin of the Dommel belongs to that of the Meuse. To the west of is the basin of the Donge, which also belongs to that of the Meuse. To the south the basin of the Dommel borders that of the Schelde. To the east is that of the Aa. Further to the south a number of rivers flow into the Meuse much further upstream.

== History ==
=== Former glory ===
The Dommel often looks like a brook nowadays, but it has many geographical features that only larger rivers have. These are the width of the rivers' valley, and large meanders from the Last Glacial Period. In the past, there was talk about the Romans navigating the Dommel. Later, the near forests were cut down, and so the river became more shallow and started to meander.

=== Water board ===
In 1863 a Water board (Waterschap) was founded for the Dommel. It had authority in all the municipalities where the Dommel flowed. One of its first priorities was to prevent flooding, especially between 's-Hertogenbosch and Boxtel. If possible, it wanted to canalize the same stretch, and to improve its navigability, but for the latter a lock would be required. c. 1865, the water board diverted the Dommel through the western city moat of 's-Hertogenbosch and made a sluice in the left dyke of the Dieze.

== Course ==
=== North of the Bocholt-Herentals canal ===
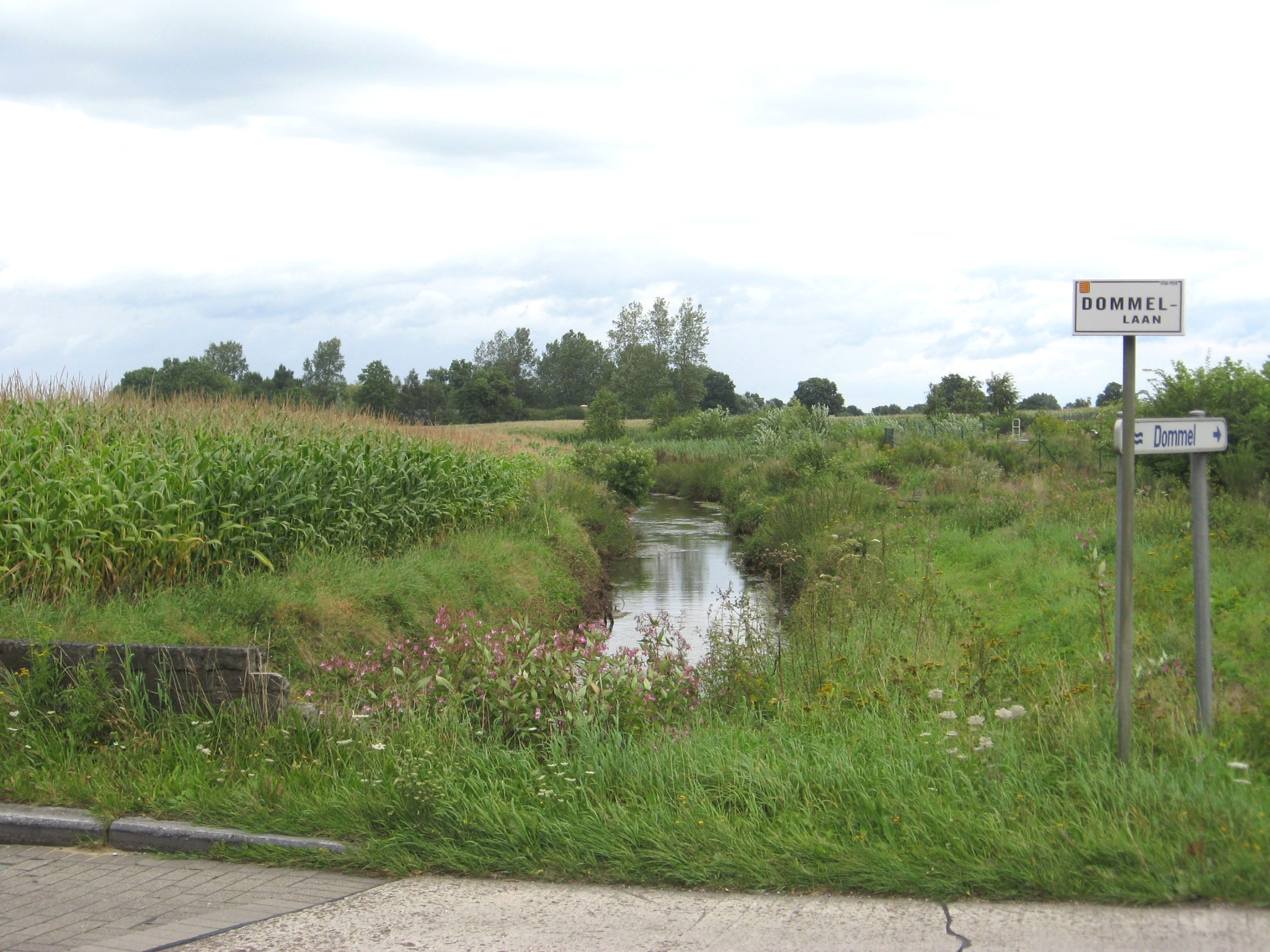
The Dommel in Belgium

The source of the Dommel is in the Kempens Plateau, part of which forms the Hoge Kempen National Park. The exact source is south of Wauberg, near Peer, Belgium. Other brooks on this plateau flow directly to the Meuse, or flow to the Schelde via the Zwarte Beek and the Demer. The source of the Dommel is 77 metres above sea level. On its course it drops 75 m.

Just west of Peer, the Dommel flows through the small nature reserve Mullemer Bemden, where it is joined by the Kleinbeek. To the east there was a small diversion of the water towards the Watermill of Peer. Part of this mill is still standing on the Molhem road. The Mullemer Bemden is part of the preserve 'Valley of the Dommel and Bollisserbeek' which stretches till west of Kleine Brogel. At the end of the preserve is the building of the Kleine Molen (small mill).

From Kleine Brogel the Dommel first passes the Wedelse Mill, which is a monument. It then passes east of Overpelt, where the Bemvoortse molen is. The Dommel passed very close to the west of Neerpelt, and then reaches the Bocholt–Herentals Canal. It passes this canal by culverts and sluices.

=== From the Bocholt-Herentals canal to Valkenswaard ===
The stretch of the Dommel from the canal near Neerpelt till Valkenswaard is especially valuable. The Dommel first flows through the nature reserve Hageven, and then passes the Dutch border, south of Schaft. From the Dutch-Belgian border the Dommel then drops only 25 meters more. The Dommel then flows along the nature reserve Malpie, which is a Heath with many meres.

This stretch of the Dommel ends at the Venberg Watermill (Venbergse Molen) south of Valkenswaard. This also the end of the popular canoe trips, that start just north of the Bocholt-Herentals canal in Belgium.

=== To Eindhoven ===
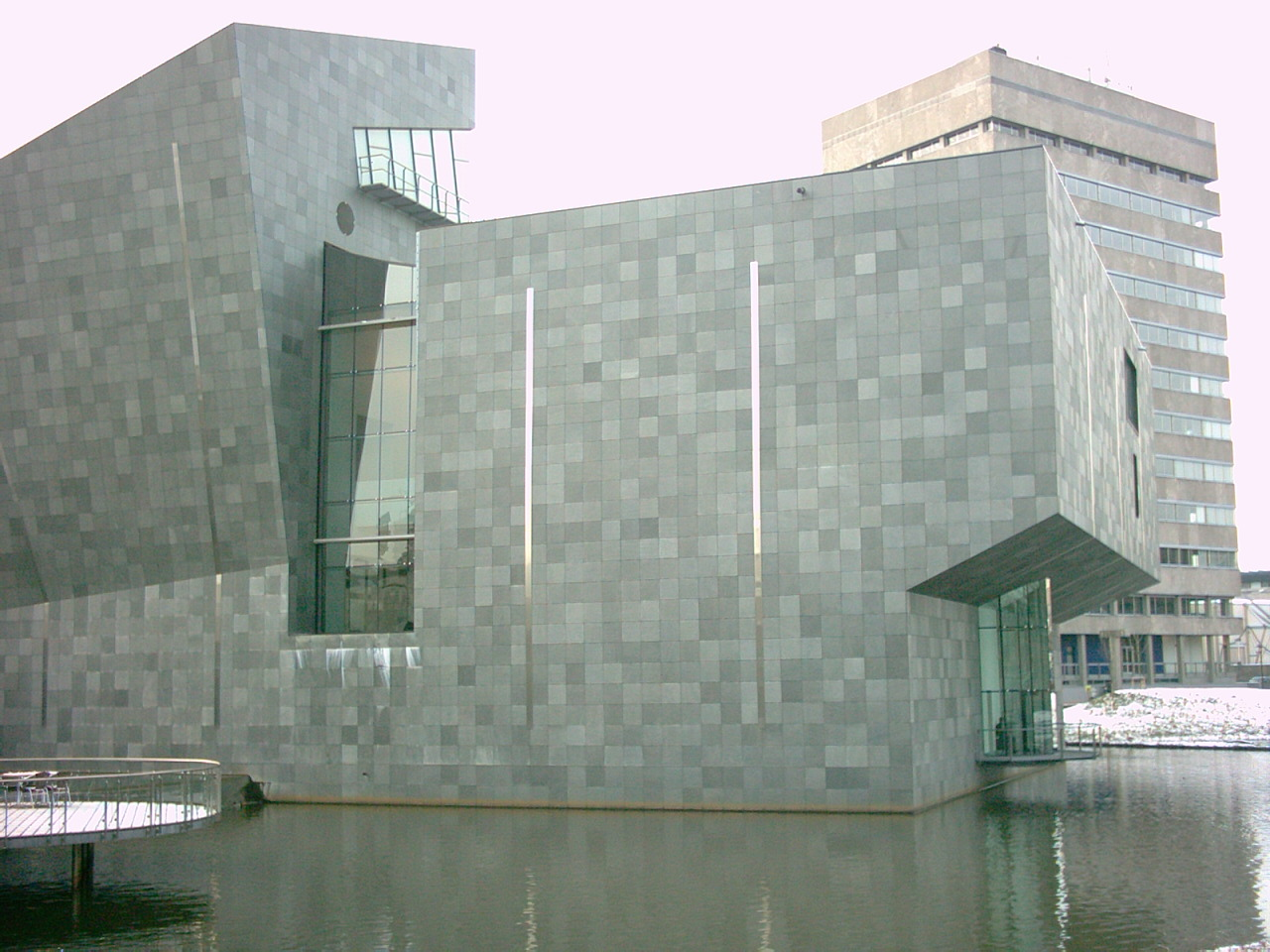
Near the Van Abbemuseum

After the Venberg Watermill, the Dommel flows north between Dommelen and Valkenswaard. It then flows between Waalre and Veldhoven before it reaches the south west tip of the Eindhoven municipality. After flowing below a handful of bridges of the motorways A67 and A2, most of the water of the Dommel is taken by the Afwateringskanaal. This canal was dug to prevent flooding in Eindhoven and ends in the Wilhelmina Canal. In the south of Eindhoven, the Dommel flows mainly through parks. First the Genneper Parken, and then the Dommelplantsoen, where the Tongelreep joins the Dommel. Next comes the Anne Frank plantsoen, and then the Dommel reaches the city center.

In the center of Eindhoven, the shores and bridges of the Dommel are rather utilitarian. An exception is the new pedestrian bridge near the Van Abbemuseum, and the new extension of this museum which juts out into the Dommel. The river then continues on the east side of Eindhoven city center. Here it almost touches the Eindhovensch Kanaal. The Dommel next flows along the terrain of the Eindhoven University of Technology.

Just west of Nuenen the Dommel is joined by the Kleine Dommel. Just south of Son the Dommel meets the Wilhelmina Canal. Here is it led through culverts that dive below the Canal. The Dommel then appears again on the other side.

=== From Son to Boxtel ===
The stretch from Son en Breugel to Vught is primarily rural. The most original part and natural state of the Dommel can be found between Eindhoven and Boxtel. Here, the Dommel still has many of its original winds and meanders, though many have also been lost. The stretch forms a cultural-historical and valuable landscape area that is part of the Het Groene Woud. This is a National Landscape situated between Eindhoven, Tilburg and 's-Hertogenbosch.

The Moerkuilen is a heath area with a mere few kilometres east of Sint-Oedenrode. It is actually a very old meander of the Dommel. Since the Last Glacial Period, it has grown closed with peat, and is now known as the Moerkuilen. The many ponds in the area have been formed by excavating peat. Just west of the Moerkuilen is the Dommelbeemden area, which is a natural monument. It (used to) consist of regularly flooded low-lying meadows used to grow hay, and higher situated "bolakkers" (high fields), where cereals were cultivated. The aim of the natural monument is to restore part of this situation.

=== Boxtel to 's-Hertogenbosch ===
About two kilometers before reaching the center of Boxtel town, the Afwateringskanaal Boxtel diverts from the Dommel. It was dug by hand in 1933–1936 in order to prevent flooding in Boxtel. It cut off a bend of the Dommel of about 4 km that flowed through Boxtel. The Boxtel 'arm' then received only little water till the waterschap reverted the situation in 2013. Now the Dommel bed is again the primary course of the Dommel in Boxtel, and the Afwateringskanaal Boxtel is only used at high water. An unexpected effect of the Afwateringskanaal is that it allows canoes to make a round trip in Boxtel, the so-called 'Rondje Boxtel'.

Boxtel is traditionally said to be the point till which the Dommel is navigable. However, navigability is a highly contextual subject. In the context of current commercial navigation the size of the ships that the Dommel can handle is much too small to make shipping economically viable. Before the introduction of the steam engine however, river ships were much smaller, and navigation was economically viable between Boxtel and 's-Hertogenbosch. The Dommel was even wide enough to allow shipping till Sint-Oedenrode, but apart from the fact that a mill in Boxtel blocked its course, there were too many bends in the river too make navigation till Sint-Oedenrode economically feasible.

Up till about 1870, there was still some navigation on the Dommel. In 1859, a ship loaded with stone and Gravel sank on the Aa near Sint-Michielsgestel while en route to Boxtel. The skipper was from Sint-Michielsgestel, and was killed together with his son.

West of Sint-Michielsgestel the Esschestroom joins the Dommel near the hamlet Halder. In Roman times Halder was probably the most important settlement on the Dommel. A small museum is dedicated to the Roman history of the area.

=== In 's-Hertogenbosch ===
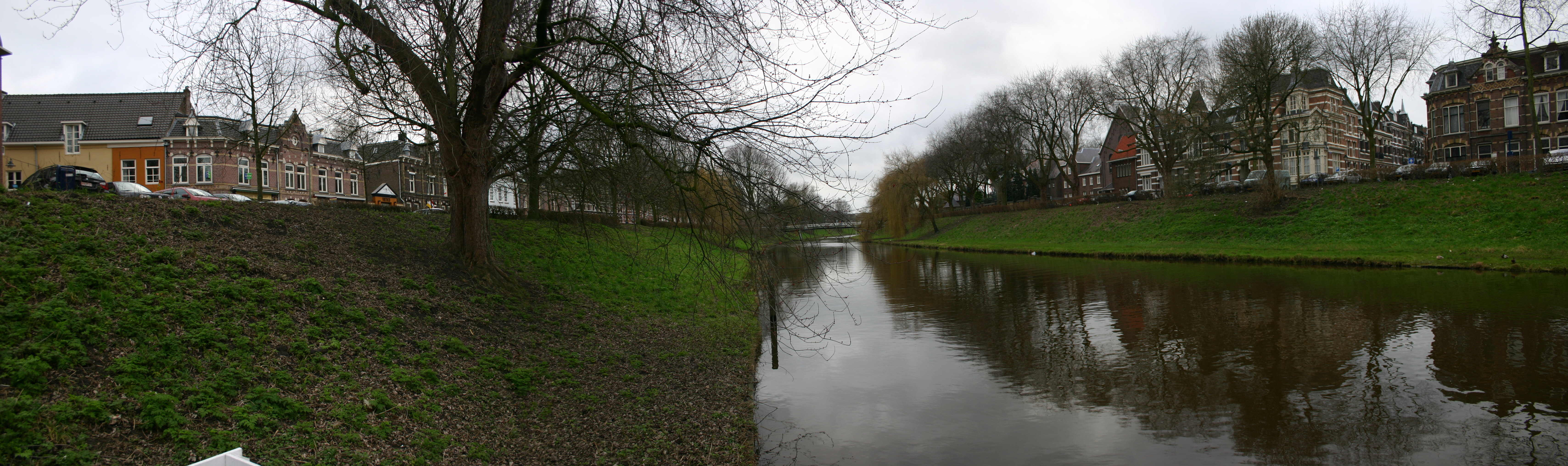
In 's-Hertogenbosch before restoration

While residents of Eindhoven generally know that their city is on the Dommel, the citizens of 's-Hertogenbosch are convinced that their city is situated on the Dieze. Up till the 1860s, this was a matter of using a different name for the same river. However, in 1864 a sluice was made in the left Dieze dyke just north of the ravelin which was north of the Oliemolen bastion in 's-Hertogenbosch. It connected the western city moat to the Dieze. In turn this city moat was connected to the Dommel at about the same time. The result was that henceforward the Dommel not only flowed to the Dieze under the name 'Binnendieze', but also flowed to the Dieze in a new bed as 'Dommel'. With more water flowing through the new bed, than through the older Binnendieze bed, confusion became inevitable.

The Dommel reaches the southern tip of the city center on its eastern side. The connection from the Dommel to the city moat was made by digging about 100 m to the west from that point. The 1864 Dommel then turns north to run along the west side of the city center. At the point where the Dommel turns northward, the Drongelens Canal starts. This was constructed from 1906 to 1910. If the water level on Dommel and Aa is high, this canal is actually the main discharge of both.

Here the Dommel in 's-Hertogenbosch is understood as the new bed that is currently called 'Dommel'. Its appearance has been influenced by two major events. The first was that the city lost its status as a fortification in the 1880s. It prompted works that canalized the city moat, obliterating many of the fortification works. The second are the post millennial works to restore the fortifications, and to make the Dommel an ecological connection zone. This meant that on the Dommel the fortifications, and in particular the city wall were made visible again. In the Dommel itself a more natural river-side was created to aid wild-life.

There are some highlights of the Dommel in 's-Hertogenbosch. The St-Jan's Bolwerk is a reconstructed part of the city wall which functions as a tiny city park. The clever aspect is that on the inside it functions as a sewer overflow. The late medieval city walls have been excavated. At St-Jan's Bolwerk a rediscovered older part, which had fallen over in the moat, has been resurrected. The Wilhelminabrug connects to the station and is heavily decorated with often neglected post war sculptures. The swing bridge near the confluence with the Dieze is a fine piece of industrial engineering.

== Gallery ==
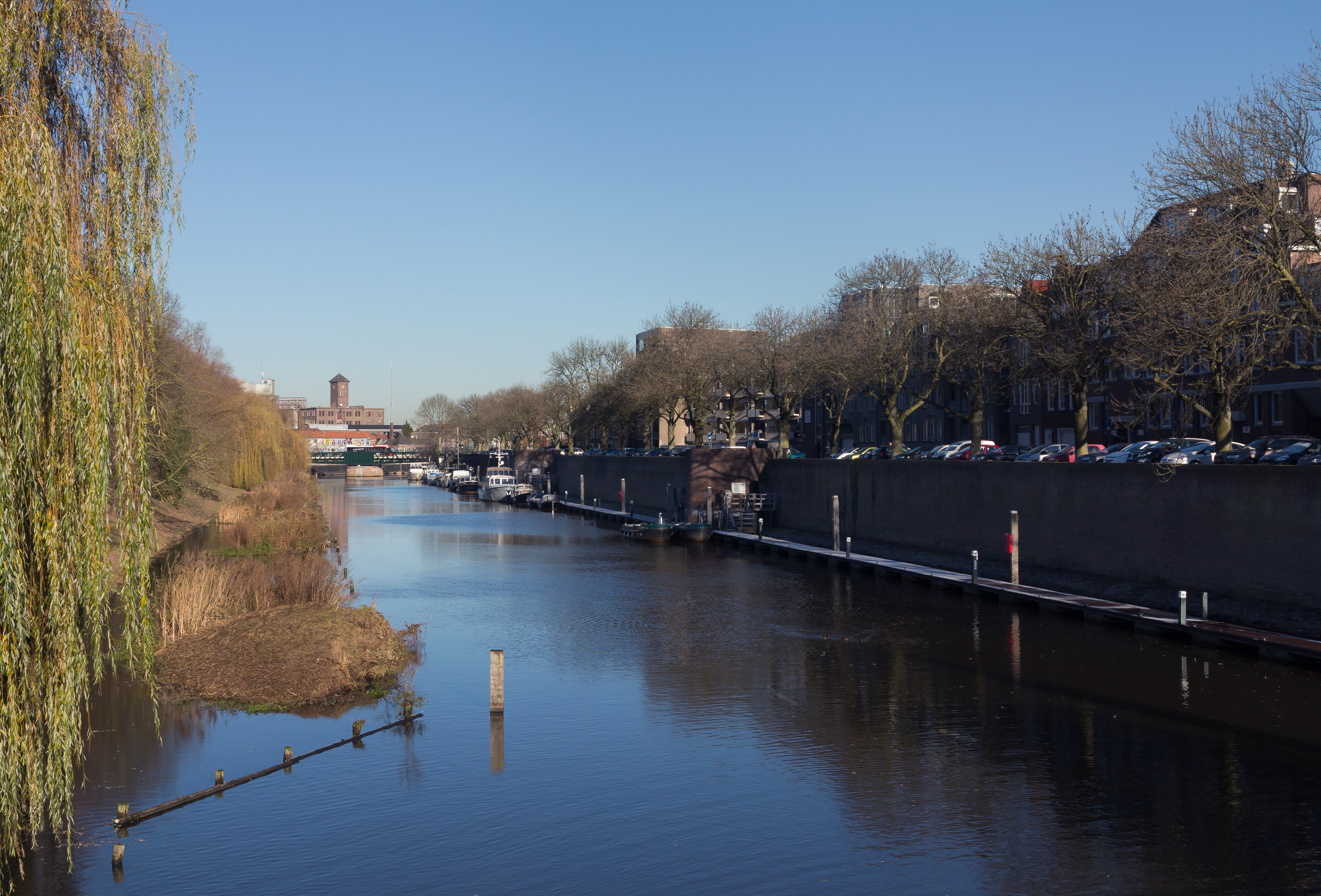
The Dommel in 's-Hertogenbosch

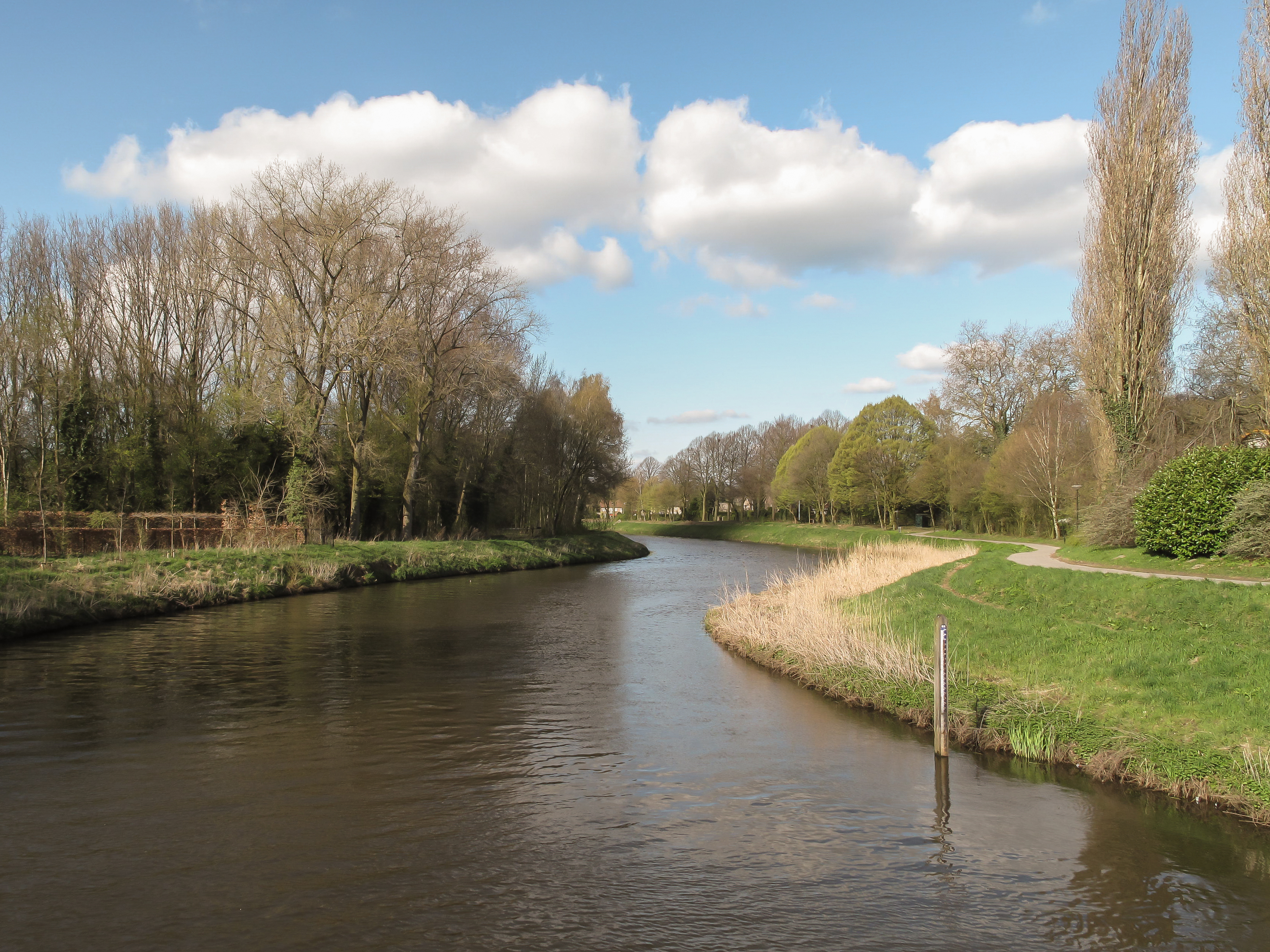
The Dommel in Sint-Michielsgestel

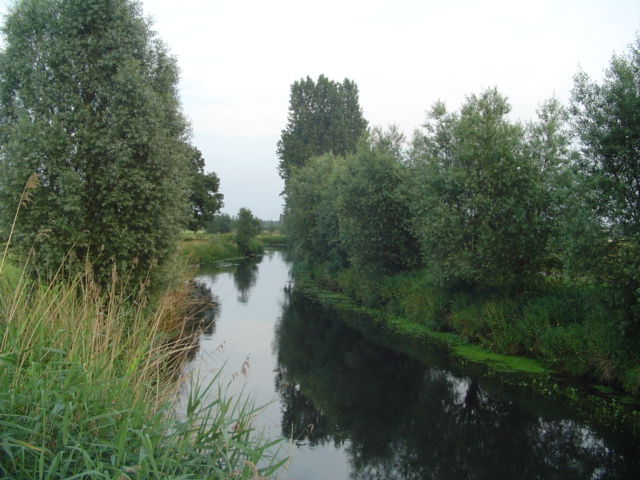
The Dommel at the Dommelbeemden in Sint-Oedenrode
