= Aalst, North Brabant =

Aalst
- Village
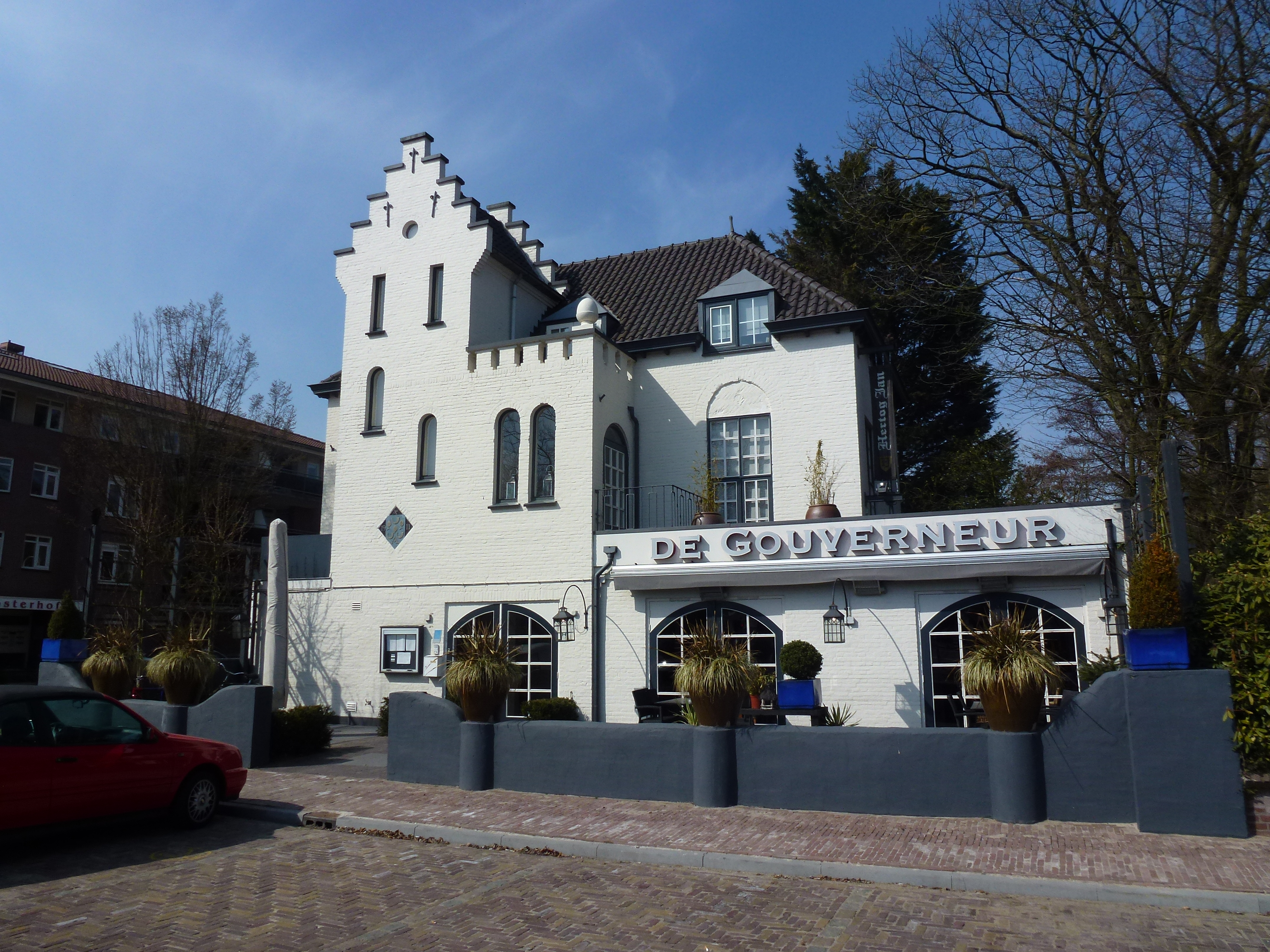
- Restaurant in Aalst

- Location in the province of North Brabant in the Netherlands Aalst (Netherlands)
- Coordinates: 51°23′47″N 5°28′36″E
- Country: Netherlands
- Province: North Brabant
- Municipality: Waalre

Area
  - Total: 1.95 km^{2} (0.75 sq mi)
- Elevation: 20 m (66 ft)

Population (2021)
  - Total: 3,690
  - Density: 1,890/km^{2} (4,900/sq mi)
- Time zone: UTC+1 (CET)
  - Summer (DST): UTC+2 (CEST)
- Postal code: 5582
- Dialing code: 040

Aalst is a village located 6 km south of Eindhoven, the Netherlands, on the Tongelreep stream and the road to Valkenswaard. It was an independent municipality until 1923, when it merged with the municipality of Waalre.

Aalst experienced rapid growth during the 1970s and 1980s as housing estates were built in the Ekenrooi area, which served as an overflow area for Eindhoven. Despite this development, the area remains very green and pleasant with large stretches of managed forest and heathland.

In September 1944, Aalst saw the British XXX Corps pass along the main road from Valkenswaard to Eindhoven as part of Operation Market Garden.

The spoken language is Kempenlands (an East Brabantian dialect, one of the many southern dialects of Dutch).

== Economy ==
In recent decades, Aalst has developed from an agricultural community into a village of Eindhoven. In 1919, industrial company Brabantia, which makes metals and plastics household products sold worldwide, was founded in Aalst. Today, Brabantia's head office is located in Valkenswaard.

== Gallery ==
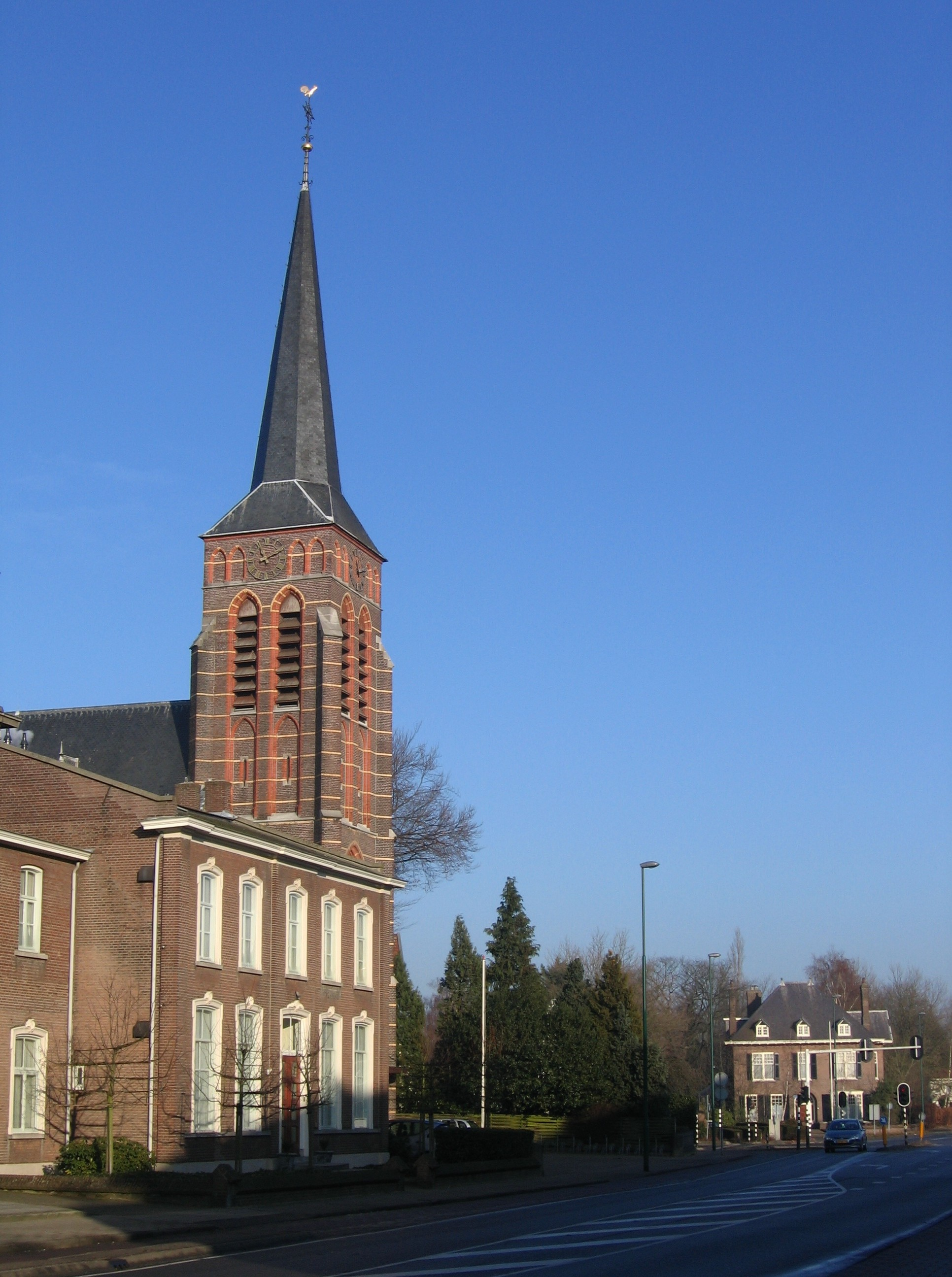
Church in Aalst

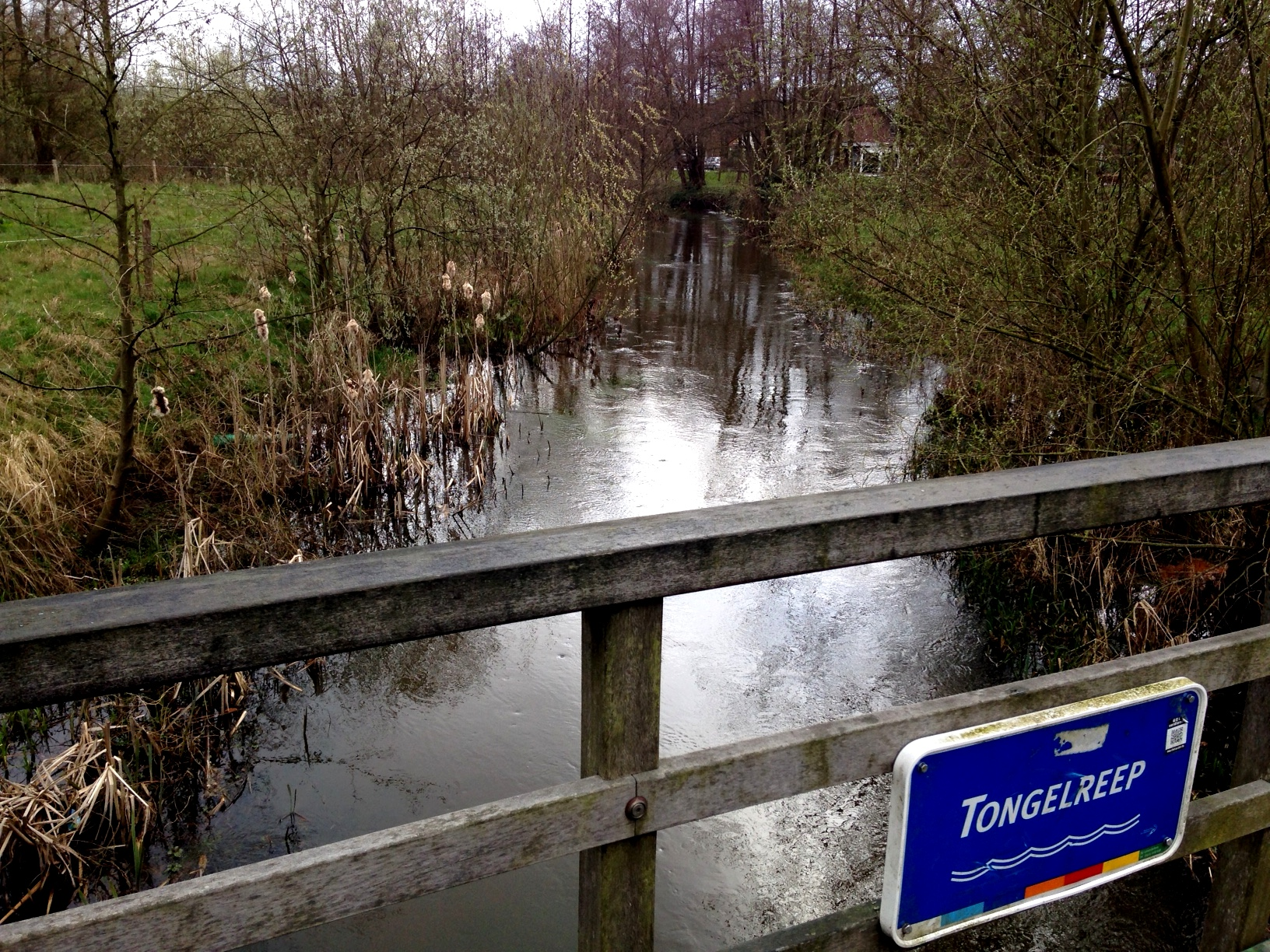
The Tongelreep stream in Aalst.

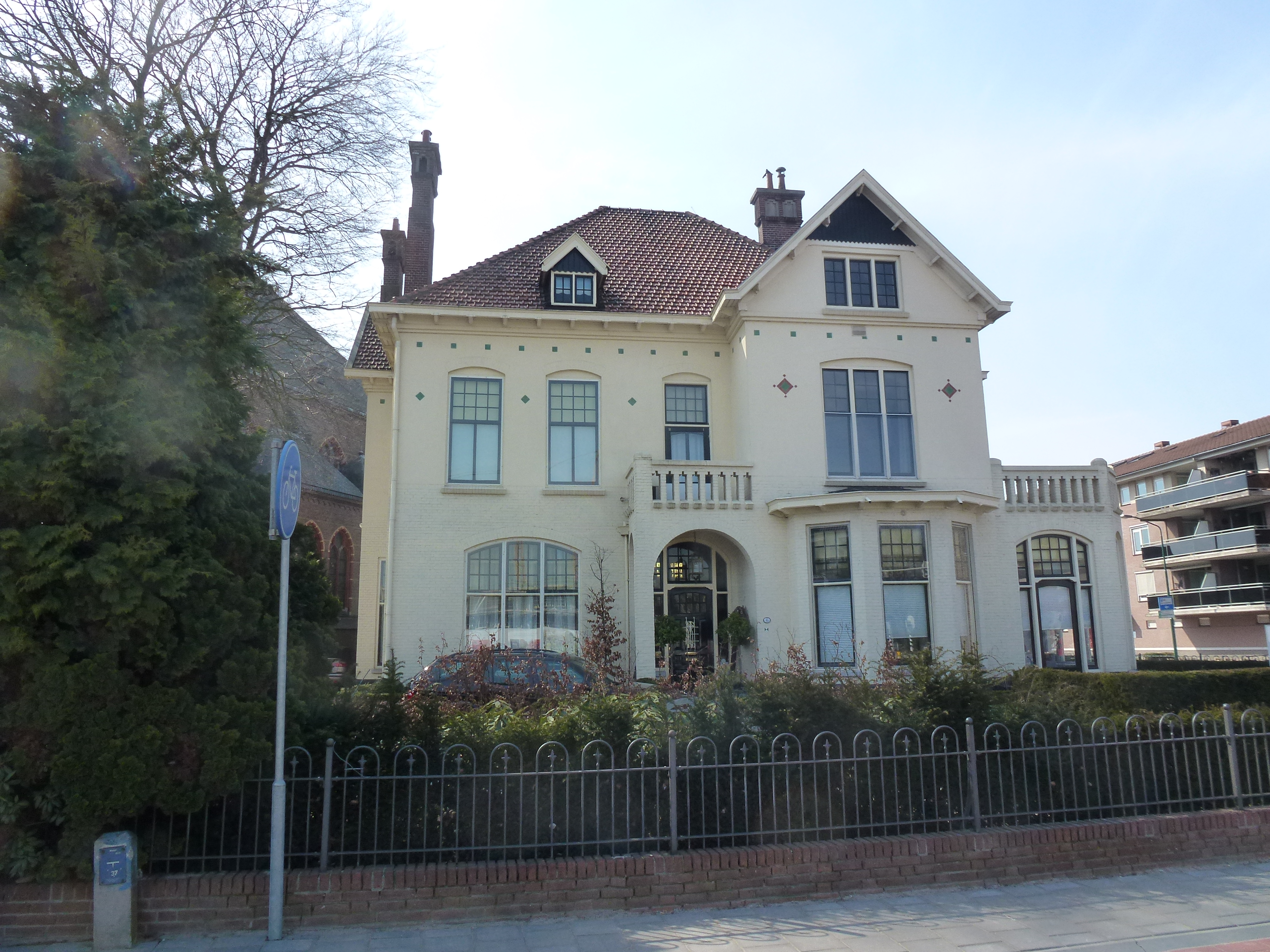
Villa in Aalst

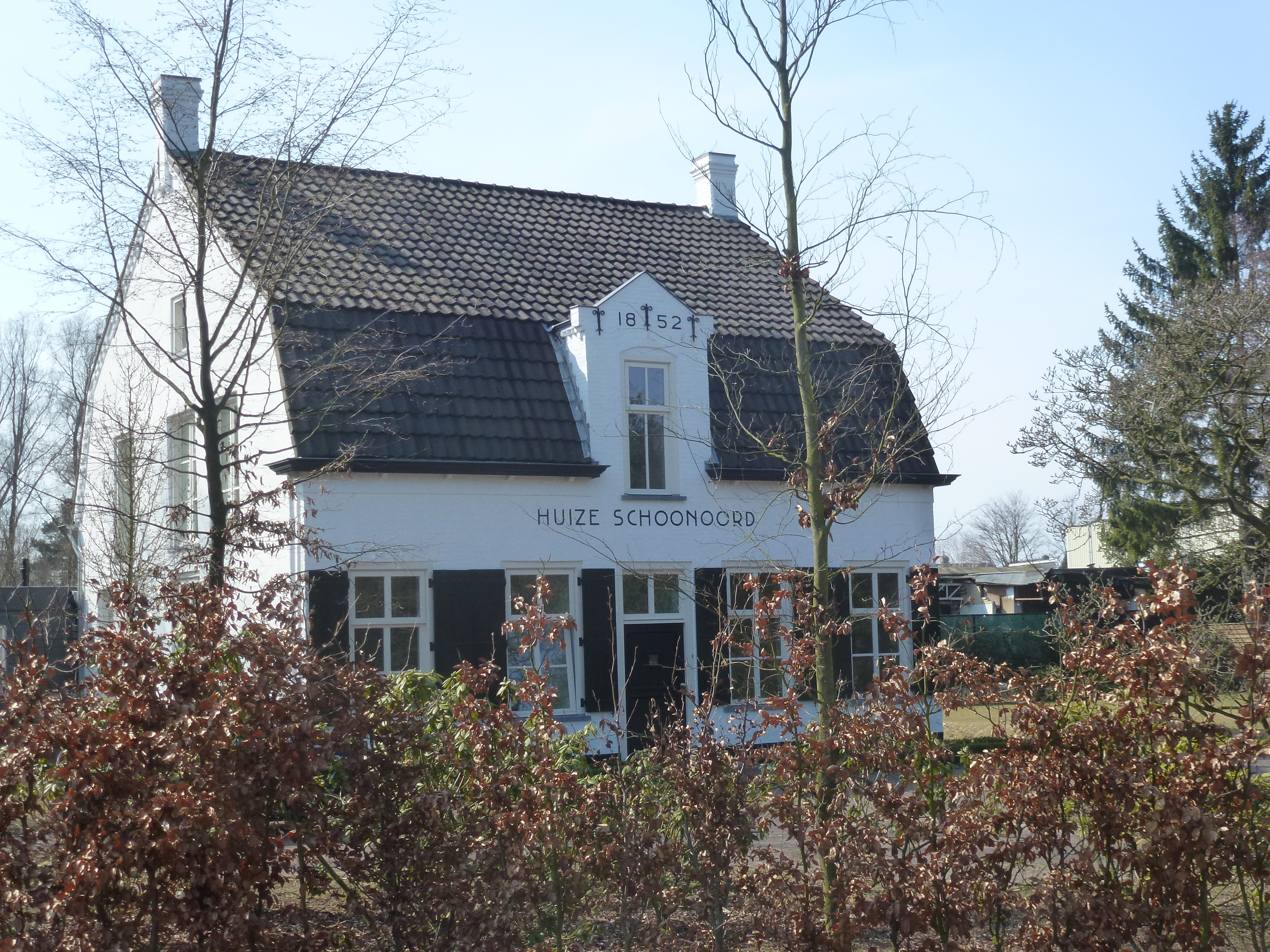
House in Aalst
