= Tongelreep =

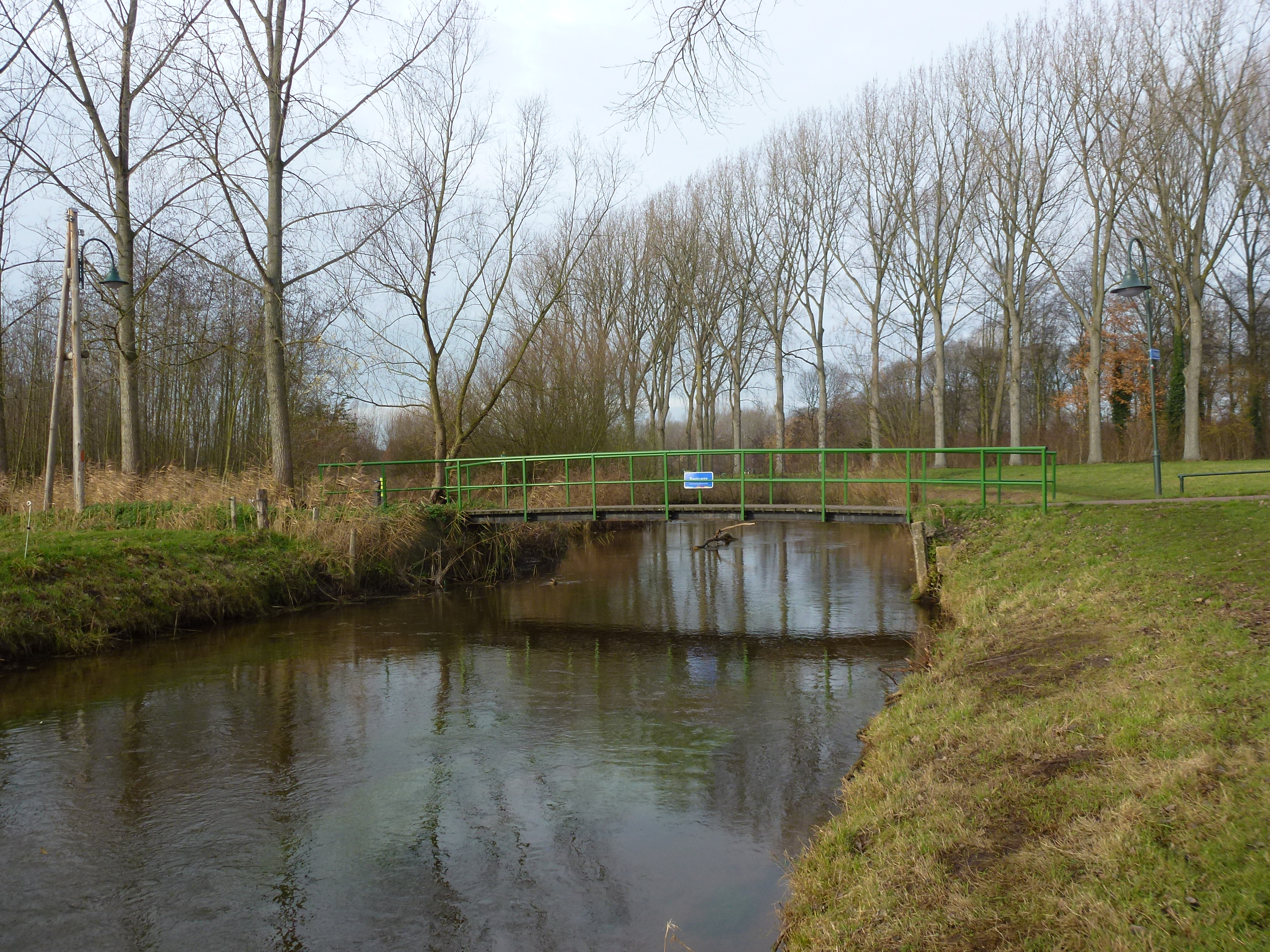
- Tongelreep in Eindhoven

Location
- Country: Belgium, Netherlands

Physical characteristics
- Source
  - location: Campine
- Mouth
  - location: Dommel
  - coordinates: 51°25′39″N 5°28′33″E

Basin features
- Progression: Dommel→ Dieze→ Meuse→ North Sea

The Tongelreep is a small tributary of the river Dommel that flows through Belgium and the Netherlands. It begins in Belgium near Neerpelt (where the stream is called the Warmbeek) and runs into the Dommel in Eindhoven by way of Valkenswaard and Aalst. The stream runs near the Achel Abbey, the Leenderbos, the Valkenhorst estates and the Genneper Parken park area.

The Tongelreep has always remained a relatively naturally flowing, clear river with natural interaction between water and landscape, although man has tried to alter the river bed since the Middle Ages. The stretch to the west of the current Leenderbos was canaled in 1890 in order to create a series of fishing ponds, and the stretch to the south of that had previously been canaled by the Achel Abbey monks. The natural character of the southern Tongelreep has been returning since 1989, when agricultural activities at the Achel Abbey ceased, and the lands were sold to environmental groups who are restoring the natural flow of the river. The grassy lands of the Warmbeek valleys are also being restored.

== Etymology ==
The word Tongelreep derives from the old regional words tonge and reep. Tonge is an older, local word for a sandy plain or hill in a raised bog; a reep is a Dutch word (still in use today) which means strip (in this case a strip of land). Tongelreep therefore means "a strip of land with sandy hills", which is borne out by its surroundings: there are a number of sandy hills along the run of the river, including the Stepkesberg, the Wolfsberg and the Zeelberg (which is now part of Valkenswaard).

The land formations of the region most likely also explain why the Tongelreep is called the Tongelreep and not just the Warmbeek. When the region was first settled, the land south of the Zeelberg was very rugged and impassable. Since the region was not tractable to extensive exploration, the early settlers probably never realized that the Tongelreep was a continuation of the Warmbeek. This theory is reinforced by early maps of the region, which show varying sources for the Tongelreep but do not suggest any link to the Belgian river.

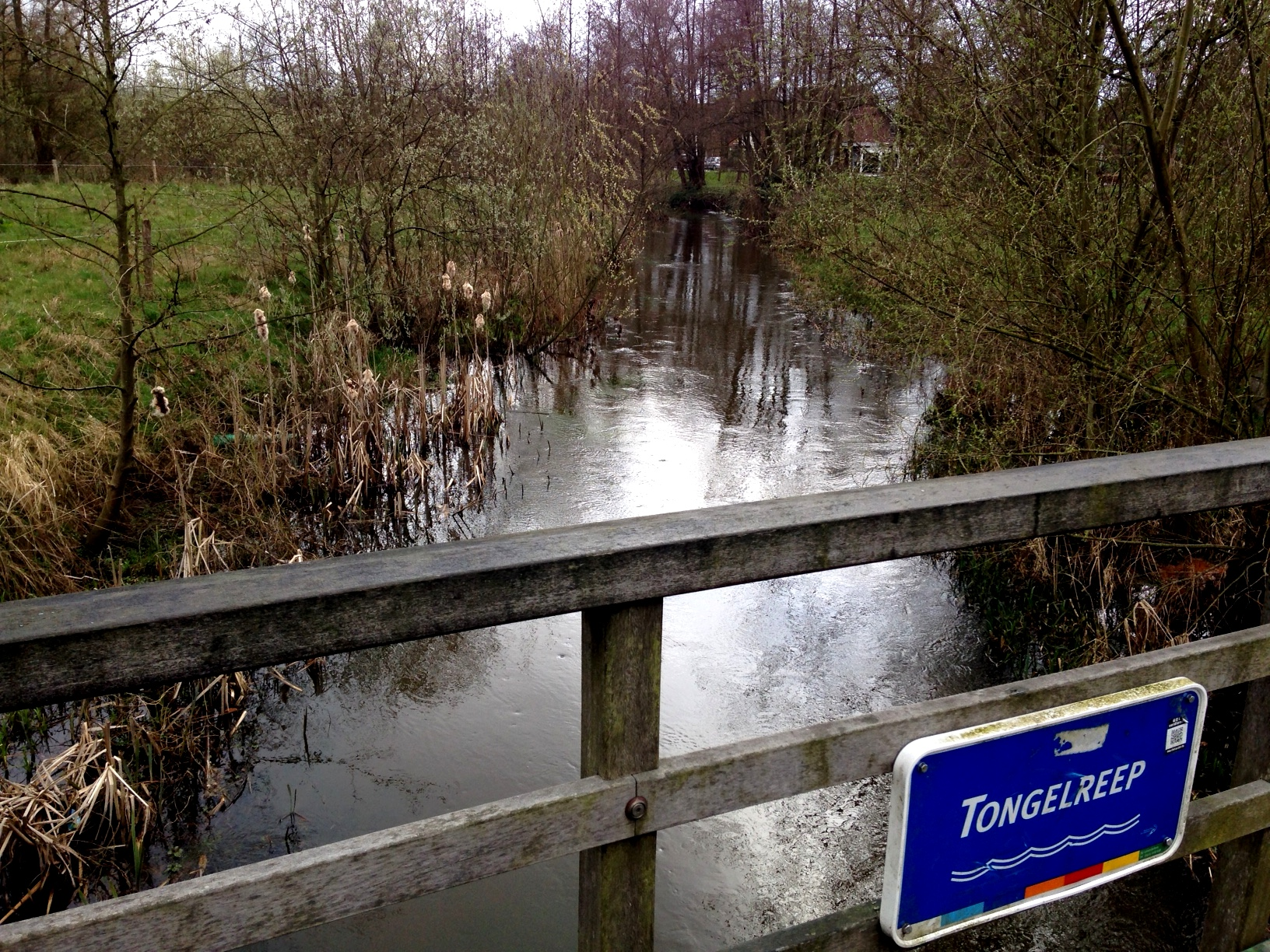
The Tongelreep as it passes through the village of Aalst.

== Drainage area ==
The spring of the Tongelreep is southwest of Erpekom in Belgium, where the name is Jongemansbeek or Vrenenbeek. It then flows north by Brogel and Kaulille, where the local name is Kleine Broekbeek. The stream is joined by the Dorperloop just south of Sint-Huibrechts-Lille; this is where the stream starts being called Warmbeek. The Warmbeek is then led under the Bocholt-Herentals Canal and flows into a water-meadow. In this area the river is joined by a parallel canal, which was built to power the Grevenbroek mill. Continuing on to the Achel Abbey, the river is then joined by the Haagbroekerloop. Upon crossing the Dutch border, the river becomes the Tongelreep. The river was canaled at this point, but this was undone by Staatsbosbeheer after they bought the land from the Abbey monks.

The current river runs west of the Leenderbos and past Valkenswaard. Water from the Tongelreep feeds several fishing ponds along the way to Aalst, where the Tongelreep enters the Genneper Parken area. Finally, the river reaches the Eindhoven Stadswandelpark and runs into the Dommel.

== Natural landscapes ==
The Warmbeek/Tongelreep is one of the clearest rivers of Flanders and North Brabant. It flows through natural landscape areas across its entire length, including the following:

- Warmbeekvallei;
- Warande;
- Achelse Kluis;
- Leenderbos;
- Valkenhorst estates;
- Genneper Parken.

=== Watermills ===
There are a number of watermills on the Warmbeek, including:

- The Broekkantmill at Sint-Huibrechts-Lille, on the Geuskens
- The Grevenbroekmill north of Achel, on the Molendijk

There were more watermills on the Warmbeek, including the old Grevenbroekmill near Genenbroek, a mill near the Catharinadal cloister of Achel, and one mill called Numolen (New Mill) near the Grevenbroek castle.
