= Drongelens Canal =

Drainage canal in the Netherlands

Afwateringskanaal van 's-Hertogenbosch naar Drongelen
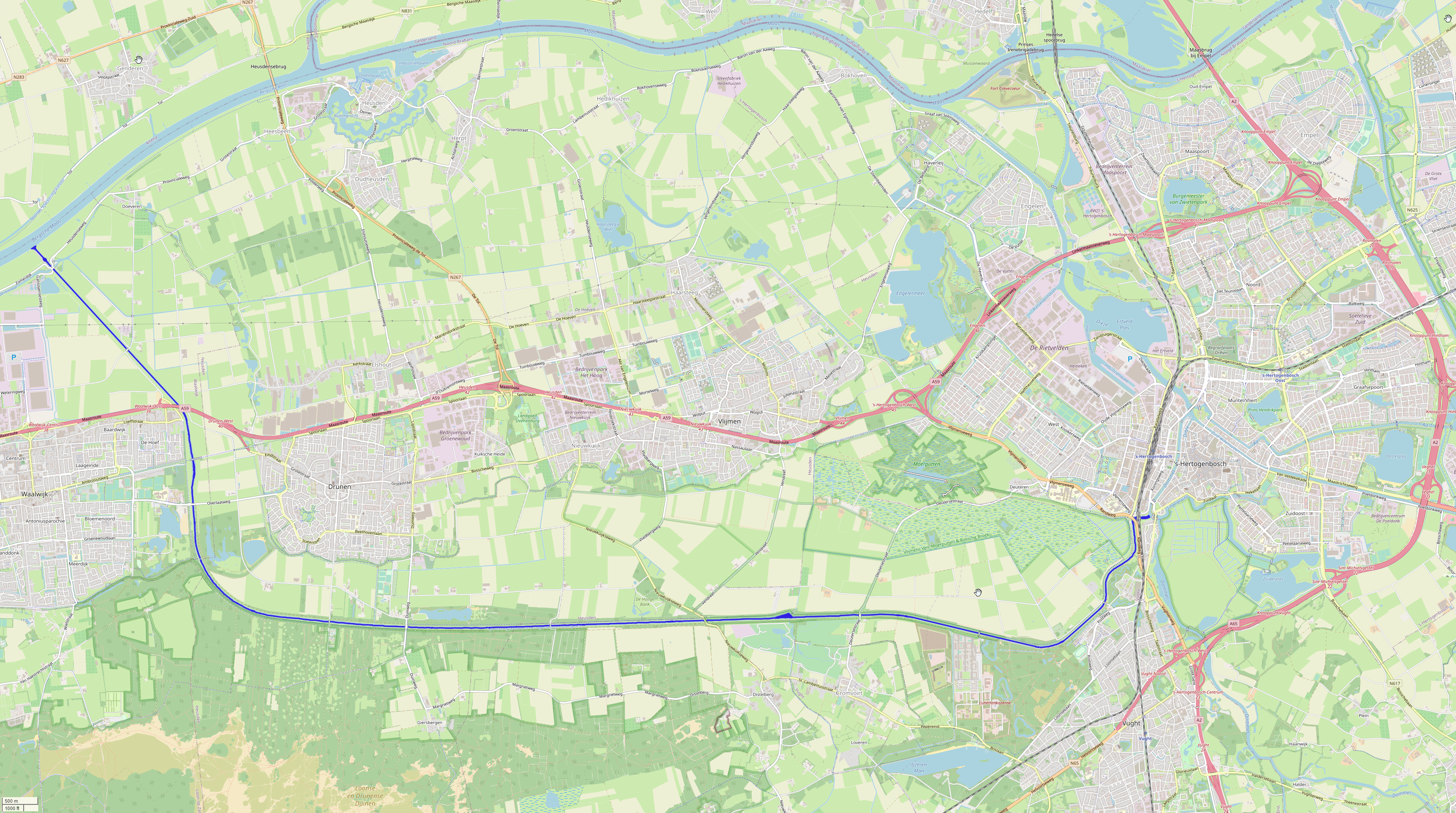
- Drongelens Canal, west of 's-Hertogenbosch
- Interactive map of Afwateringskanaal van 's-Hertogenbosch naar Drongelen
- Country: Netherlands

Specifications
- Length: 19.18 km (11.92 miles)
- Maximum boat beam: 18 m (59 ft 1 in)
- Status: N/a

History
- Date completed: 1911

Geography
- Start point: Wilhelminaplein, 's-Hertogenbosch
- End point: Bovenlandsesluis, Bergse Maas
- Beginning coordinates: 51.682388°N 5.292815°E
- Ending coordinates: 51.715603°N 5.070358°E

The Drongelens Canal is a drainage canal that runs from 's-Hertogenbosch to Drongelen in North Brabant. The colloquial Dutch name, and the name used on street signs is Drongelens Kanaal. The official Dutch name is Afwateringskanaal van 's-Hertogenbosch naar Drongelen.

== History ==
=== The need to separate the Meuse and the Waal ===
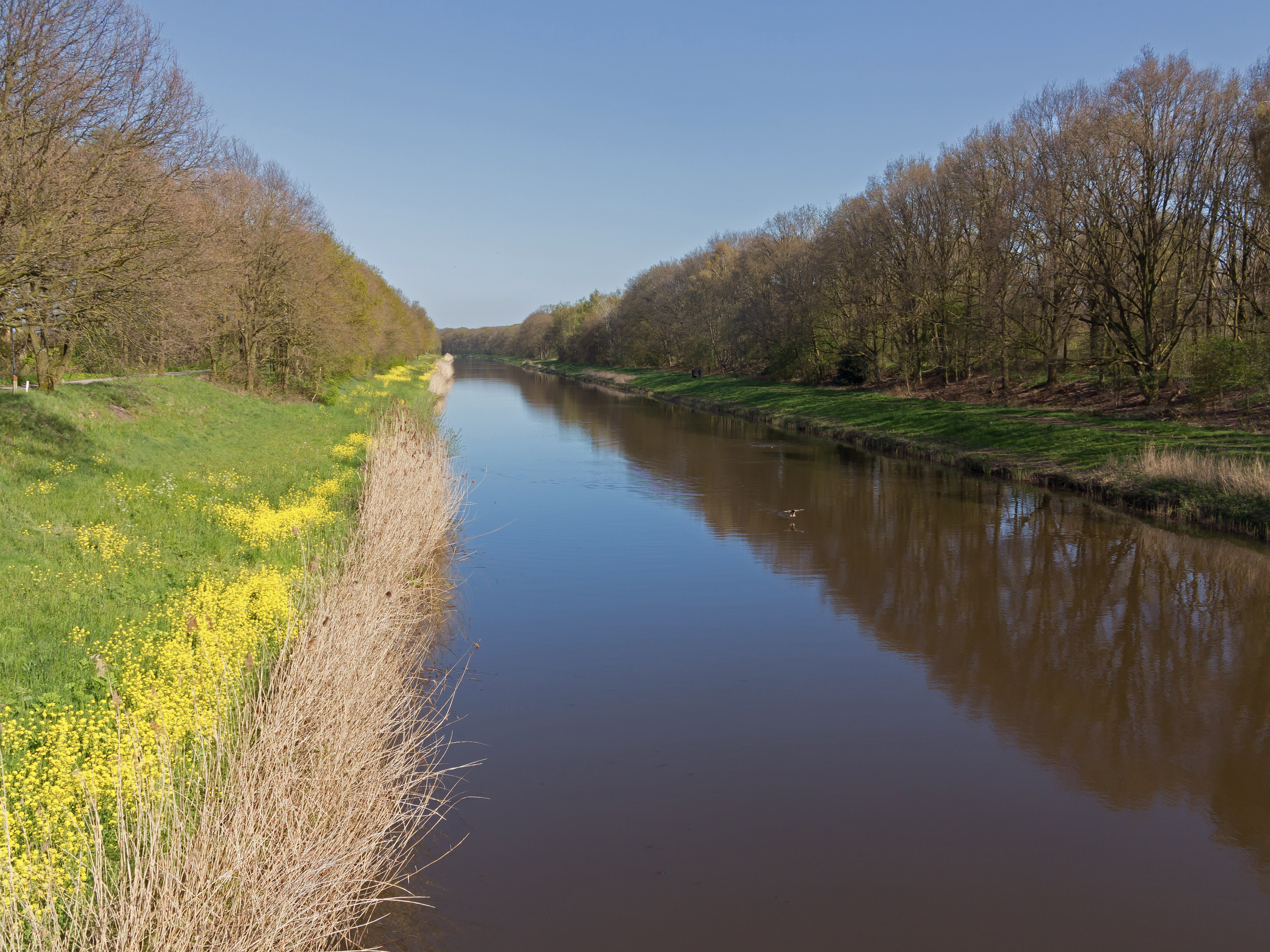
Drongelens Canal from the Lunetten Bridge

Seasonal flooding was a regular event in the drainage basin of the Aa and Dommel. It often became disastrous when these rivers could not discharge into the Meuse. This happened when either the Meuse or the Rhine were at a high level, often because of melting snow upstream. The high chance for flood disasters in the region was caused by the fact that since 1273, the Meuse discharged into the Waal somewhat downstream of 's-Hertogenbosch. This way extreme flooding on the left bank of the Meuse often occurred because the Rhine was high.

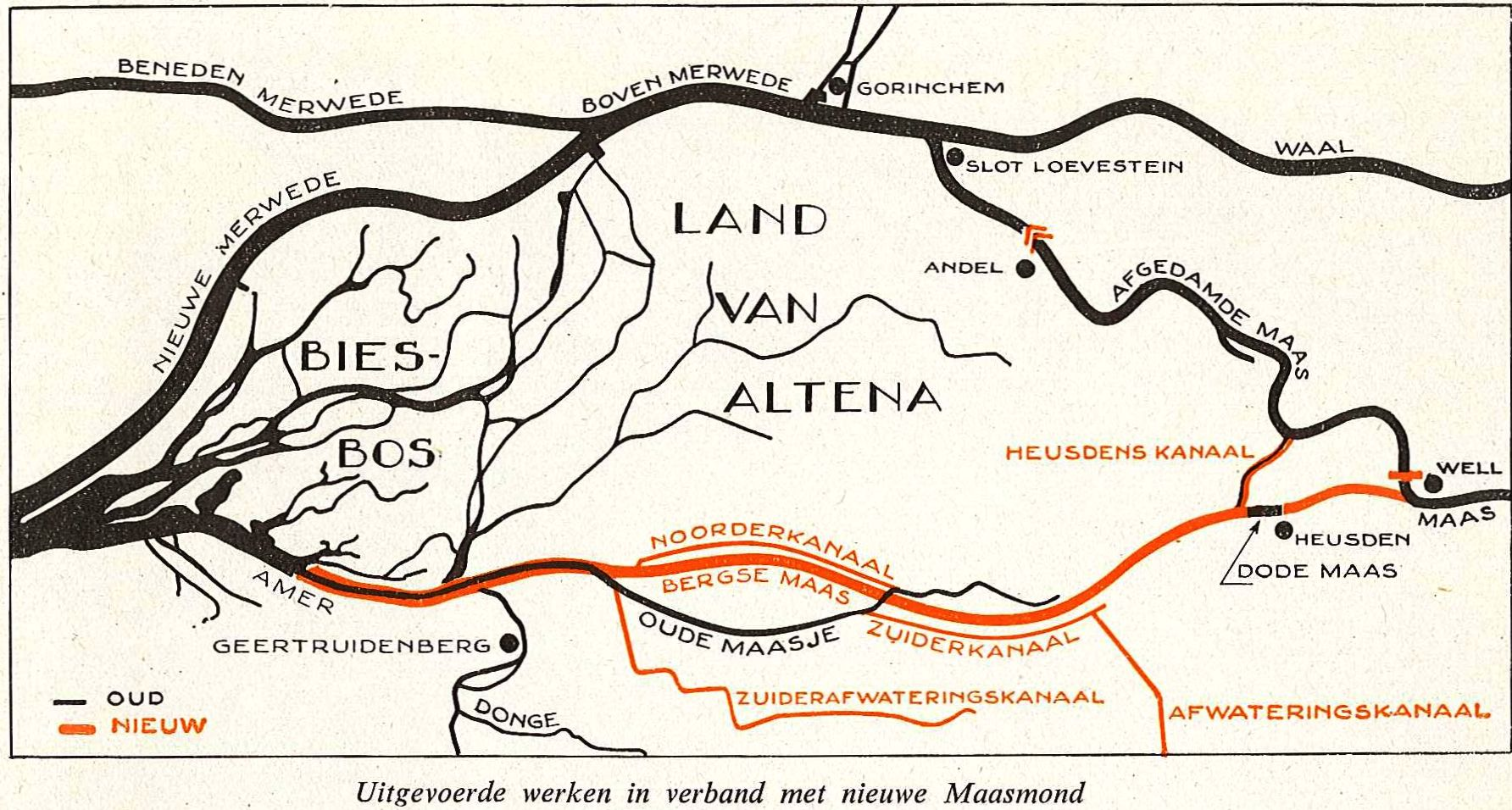
Bergsche Maas in red

In the late 1830s Belgium started to irrigate the Campine with water from the Meuse. This caused severe problems for shipping on the Meuse. Other problems downstream were that the Zuid-Willemsvaart, the Aa, Dommel, and Leij could hardly process the increased amount of water from the Campine. The Dutch themselves further aggravated the problem from the 1850s, when they started to dig for peat in the Peel.

In 1823 Baron C.R.T. Krayenhoff had proposed a design to separate the Waal and the Meuse. Some measures were taken in the mid-nineteenth century. In 1859 a lock was made in the old Canal of St. Andries, upstream of 's-Hertogenbosch. In 1861-1874 the Nieuwe Merwede was dug. The disastrous flood season of late December 1880 would finally induce the government to take effective measures. The flood included a breach in the dykes near Nieuwkuijk and put the complete Land van Heusden en Altena under water. It caused so much damage that in January 1883 the law to move the mouth of the Meuse was passed.

The law led to the construction of the river / canal Bergsche Maas, from Well just west of 's-Hertogenbosch, to the Amer west of Geertruidenberg. This was such a big project that it was completed only in 1904.

=== Projected Canal 's-Hertogenbosch to Hedikhuizen ===
The 1883 law to move the mouth of the Meuse foresaw the construction of some drainage channels. For 's-Hertogenboch and the Dieze a drainage canal was projected from near 's-Hertogenosch to Hedikhuizen (between 's-Hertogenbosch and Heusden). This canal was to take all the water of the Leij, but only the excessive water of the Dommel, which was said to sometimes discharge 40 m^{3} water per second. During the debate about the law the minister noted that this project canal to Hedikhuizen perhaps did not belong in the overall law, because it served a local interest.

=== Construction of the Zestig-Else bridge ===
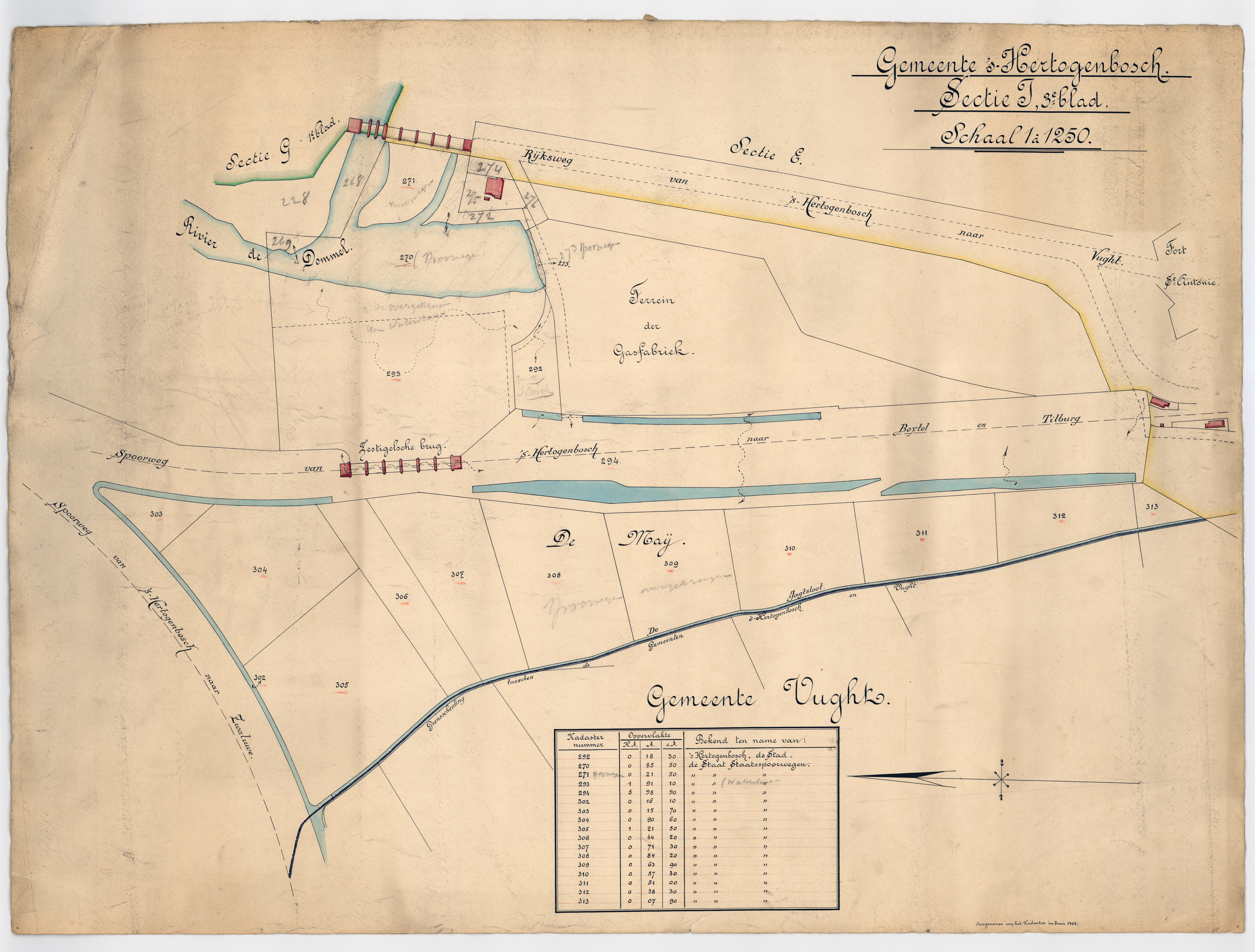
De 60 m bridge in the Utrecht - Boxtel railway in 1904

's-Hertogenbosch was connected to the Utrecht–Boxtel railway on 1 November 1868, when the stretch from 's-Hertogenbosch to Vught opened. Of course the railroad was constructed on a high dyke, so it would not be bothered by the regular flooding near 's-Hertogenbosch. However, this railroad dyke would not be able to stop these floods, and so wide passageways had to be made for the water to pass it.

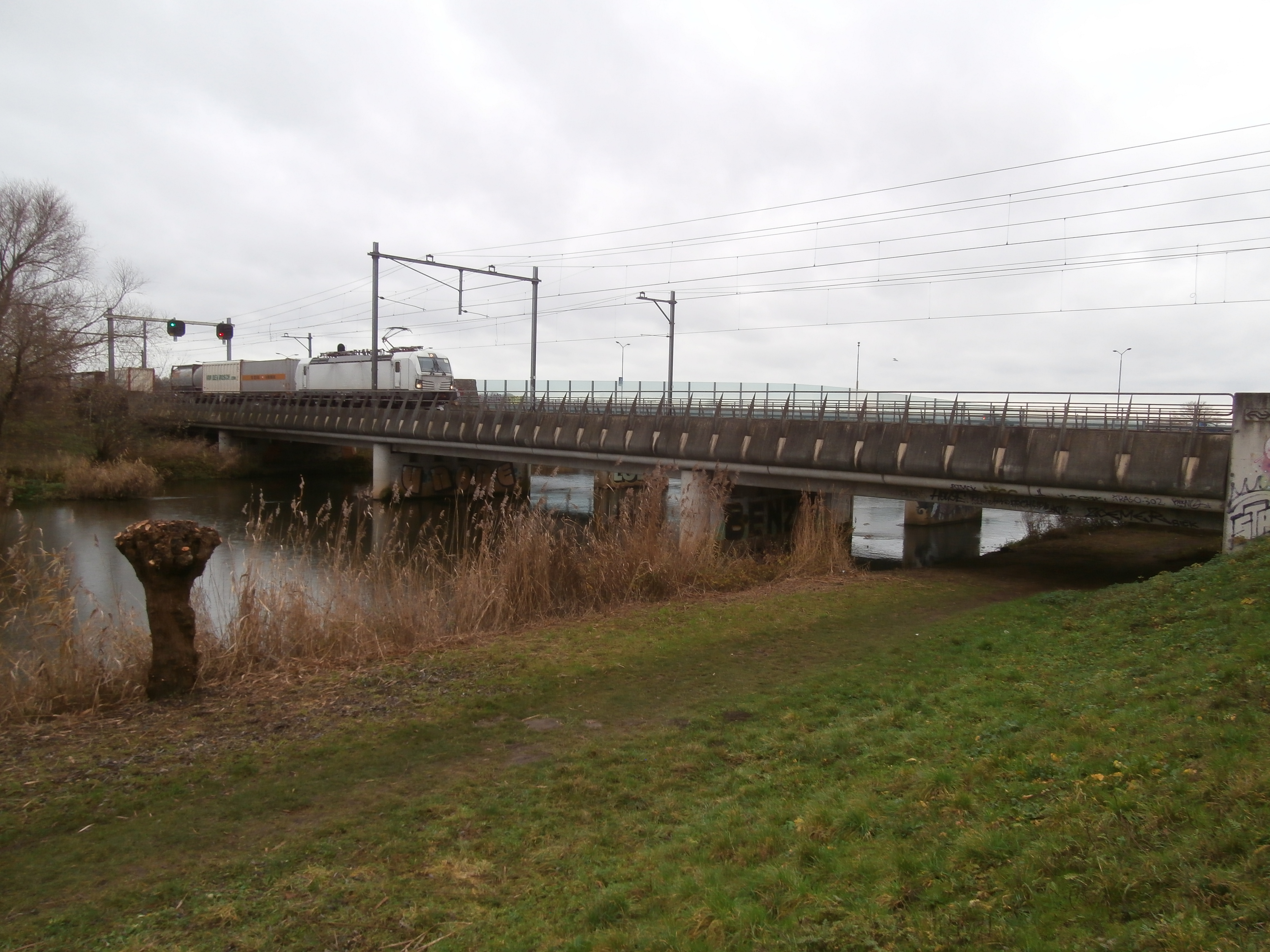
Zestig-Else Railroad Bridge near 's-Hertogenbosch in 2020

In October 1868 the construction of an overflow in the railroad had been tendered. It was constructed north and opposite of Deuteren Bastion. Due to its length this was called the 100 meter bridge Honderd-elsche Brug This 100 m bridge was somewhat to the north of where the Drongelens Canal would be.

In the 1880s, the Lage Zwaluwe-'s-Hertogenbosch railway constructed. It required the track to bend to the west south of 's-Hertogenbosch railway station, but due to the 100 m bridge, there was not enough space to make a safe bend before the 100 m bridge. Making a bend after the bridge would make the proposed canal exit north of the dyke on which this track would be, and was also unacceptable. Therefore, authorities decided to make a new overflow bridge to the south, which would also by used by the new canal. This would become the 60 m bridge Zestig-elsche Brug, named for its 6 arcs of 10 m each.

The new Zestig-Else bridge was built 300 m south of the old bridge. As an overflow in the railroad dyke it did not span a river or canal. Instead, it had a wall between its pillars. On each side of this wall there was a bed to prevent the bottom from eroding. This threshold had a height of 2-2.2 m above N.A.P. This way the canal would only drain the Dommel and Aa basin when the water rose above that level.

In 1997 the Zestig-Else bridge would be replaced when the number of tracks to the south was expanded. It seems that this bridge does not contain an overflow between its pillars.

== The current Drongelens Canal is planned ==
=== A change of plans ===
By 1889, the government plans for the drainage canal to Hedikhuizen had changed. The new plan was for the current canal from 's-Hertogenbosch to Drongelen, west of Heusden. The local water board was enthusiastic, because the drainage would then become dependent on the lower Meuse level near Drongelen, instead of that near Fort Crèvecoeur. It did have some concerns. The canal was thought to be a bit small, so it required that the Dieze would also remain a drainage river. It also thought that the Dieze / Dommel would remain too high for good drainage of the surrounding lands.

Already in 1891, the acquisition of land for the new canal started. In December 1891 the law to acquire these by eminent domain (compulsory purchase) was proposed. This law also had the route of the canal. It started at the 60 m wide bridge in the Utrecht–Boxtel railway, just south of the railway station of 's-Hertogenbosch. It then south west of this railway, along Fort Isabella, and passing it. It then followed the Kampdijk to the west, and then the dyke of the Binnenpolder of Cromvoirt. It then continued through the heaths of Helvoirt and Drunen and then north to Baardwijk, and from there, northwest to the Meuse. The mouth of the canal was at Gansoyen, a village that would disappear in 1894 due to the digging of the Bergse Maas. Therefore, the official name refers to Drongelen, a nearby village on the other side of the Meuse.

The final plan determined a discharge capacity of the canal of 80 m^{3}/s. This was an estimation of the maximum combined discharge of Dommel and Aa. It was a major change of the plan from the original plan, which only saw to discharging the water of the Leij, and the excess water of the Dommel. Now it would be able to process all of the water of these three rivers. From the perspective of drainage, it would move the mouth of the Dieze. The Dieze would then become available to process the waters of the Beersche Maas. Total cost of the canal would be 1,300,000 guilders, twice that of the earlier Hedikhuizen plan.

The idea behind the change of plan seemed to be that several overflow areas would no longer be necessary, and would remain dry every season. This would be beneficial to somebody, but not for the local (water) authorities, which paid for part of the canal. They stated that the new plan blocked drainage of the Beerse Maas to the Baardwijksche Overlaat, and that the Hedikhuizen plan did not. This way they thought they paid for better drainage upstream, but lost the advantage of having their lands irrigated with fertile Meuse water, instead of the water from Aa and Dommel, which did not deposit much fertile sediment.

Another point of view is that the water board simply wanted to annul its part of the bill for the movement of the Meuse mouth, which part came to a staggering 2,000,000 guilders. In answer to the protests of the water boards, the minister stated that the movement of the mouth of the Meuse by itself, brought about the closure of the Baardwijkse Overlaat. The Bergsche Maas would require a dyke at the regular height for rivers, and an overflow area could not function in such circumstances. Therefore, it was logical that the Beerse Maas had to discharge on the Dieze.

=== Delayed construction ===
Now the plan for the Drongelens Canal got mixed up with a plan for the Dieze Canal, and a lock to stop the Beerse Maas water near the railway station in 's-Hertogenbosch. Money for all three was brought on the 1896 budget. The reason for this was that the lock at Crèvecoeur would become useless, because its bottom would be too high for the lowered Meuse level. It would get a new purpose as a sluice, only suitable for ships when the level of the Meuse was high. The Dieze Canal from Engelen to the Meuse would include a new deeper lock for ships.

The sluice at the end of the proposed canal, the Bovenlandse Sluis, was built way before the canal was built. The reason was that it would be more economical to make one construction of the lock and a culvert that led the Oude Maasje below the Drongelens Canal. On 9 December 1896 there was a tender for the sluice. This sluice was finished in 1899. The Drongelens canal was reported ready and functioning in 1902, before the Bergse Maas was opened., but this was in error.

== Construction of the Drongelens Canal ==
=== Opening of the Bergsche Maas ===
On 18 August 1904 the Bergsche Maas was officially opened by the queen. Nevertheless, in early 1905 the work to construct the canal still had to start, even though everything (sluice, threshold) was ready to start the work. Of course, the above-mentioned conflict between the water board and the government played its part. However, it is probable that authorities first wanted to see the effects of the move of the mouth of the Meuse before continuing work on the canal.

As expected, the effects of the move by themselves were not that beneficial for the drainage of Dommel and Aa. After the winter of 1904-1905 many lands near 's-Hertogenbosch were still under water in April. In the winter of 1905-1906 the Meuse was almost as high as in the winter of 1880–1881. The water board noted that the average Meuse level near Heusden was 2 m lower, compared to the previous years. Now the general water board of Northeast North Brabant changed its mind and started to push for completion of the canal. The high Meuse also caused that the Beerse Maas flowed in early 1906, something that was expected to become exceptional. Some experts then also started to doubt whether the Drongelens canal would have the supposed benefits.

=== Actual construction ===
In 1906 works at the start of the canal were taken up again. In August 1906 works on the protective bed of the threshold in 's-Hertogenbosch were underway again. It was now said to be near the 'former' Honderdelsche Brug. In November 1906 the final design drawings for the canal were ready, and the order was about to be tendered. At that moment the works on the extremities of the canal were already finished, or almost finished. The work was to be completed by 1 September 1909.

In April 1907 the order for construction was given to contractors De Groot and Calis, who made the lowest bid. The first choice that had to be made for construction, was whether it would be 'dry' or 'wet'. Wet construction would mean dredging a canal from 's-Hertogenbosch to Drongelen. Dry construction would mean digging / excavating a canal from Drongelen to 's-Hertogenbosch, and letting the water in later. The contractors chose dry construction, which meant that they started near Baardwijk.

By May 1907 a temporary railroad was under construction near Baardwijk. By June 1907 about 160 workers were busy. In September 1907 310,000 guilders were brought on the government budget for 1908 as second term for the canal. In June 1908 a bridge near Baardwijk for the tramway was tested. At the end of 1908 the canal reported to be almost ready.

The canal was mostly dug by machines. Excavator 1 Excavateur no. 1 was nothing special. It had been built by Conrad shipyard in Zaandam, and moved on three rails. This excavator did preparatory work, and could move about 300 m^{3} per day. The Excavator-Transporters No. 2 & 3 excavateur transporteur no. 2 & 3 were of a type new to the Netherlands. They had been built by Lübecker Maschinenbau Gesellschaft. They each moved on four carts on a double track of 90 cm gauge which was 5 m apart. The railroad ties were 7.5 m long and 70 cm apart. The machines had three engines of 50, 10 and 6 ihp. Each machine could excavate 1,250 m^{3} per day. Excavator-Transporters No. 4 excavateur transporteur no. 4 had been delivered by Machine Factory Hollandsche IJssel (previously De Jongh & Co.) in Oudewater (which still exists) in early summer 1908. It was comparable to 2 & 3.

In late winter 1910 the water near 's-Hertogenbosch was again extremely high. At that moment in March, all the machinery, 500 men, eight locomotives, a steam ship and six barges were very near to 's-Hertogenbosch. The contractors then worked with all their might to prevent a flood, and filled over 30,000 sand bags. In the night their employees guarded the dykes against people who wanted to break them in order to make their own land dry. When the canal was finished, 2,000,000 m^{3} of ground had been moved. The canal's maximum discharge had risen to 95 m^{3}/s.

=== Effectiveness of the canal ===
On the night of 8–9 September 1910 the Dommel opened the canal by flowing over the threshold below the railway bridge south of 's-Hertogenbosch station. Whether the canal would serve its purpose could only be determined by the occurrence of a very high water level on the upper Meuse. In the winter of 1913-1914 such a high water level occurred. The province noted that the new mouth of the Meuse and the drainage canal discharged enormous amounts of water. The fact that many polders nevertheless continued to be flooded was blamed on the continued high water level to the west, that prevented part of the discharge. Meanwhile, the canal had also been useful for irrigation. To the contrary one of the water boards complained that the canal did not discharge well enough.

=== Requests to broaden the canal ===
By 1919 there were requests to broaden the canal. It was quite effective, but not built for the sharp increase in drainage that took place after it was opened. In late December 1926 there was a comment about: 'The unmaintainable situation that existed before the move of the mouth of the Meuse'. It noted that in recent years the speed of discharge upstream had increased so dramatically, that without the Bergse Maas and the Drongelens Canal, half of North Brabant and Gelderland would have been under water at the time. Furthermore, that the Drongelens Canal as it was, would not be sufficient for developments in the near future.

By 1930 the canal had indeed become insufficient, because its shores did not allow a greater discharge speed than 60^{3}/s. Therefore, it was said that the profile of the canal had to be changed and its dykes needed to become heavier.

== The canal today ==
=== The threshold in 's-Hertogenbosch ===
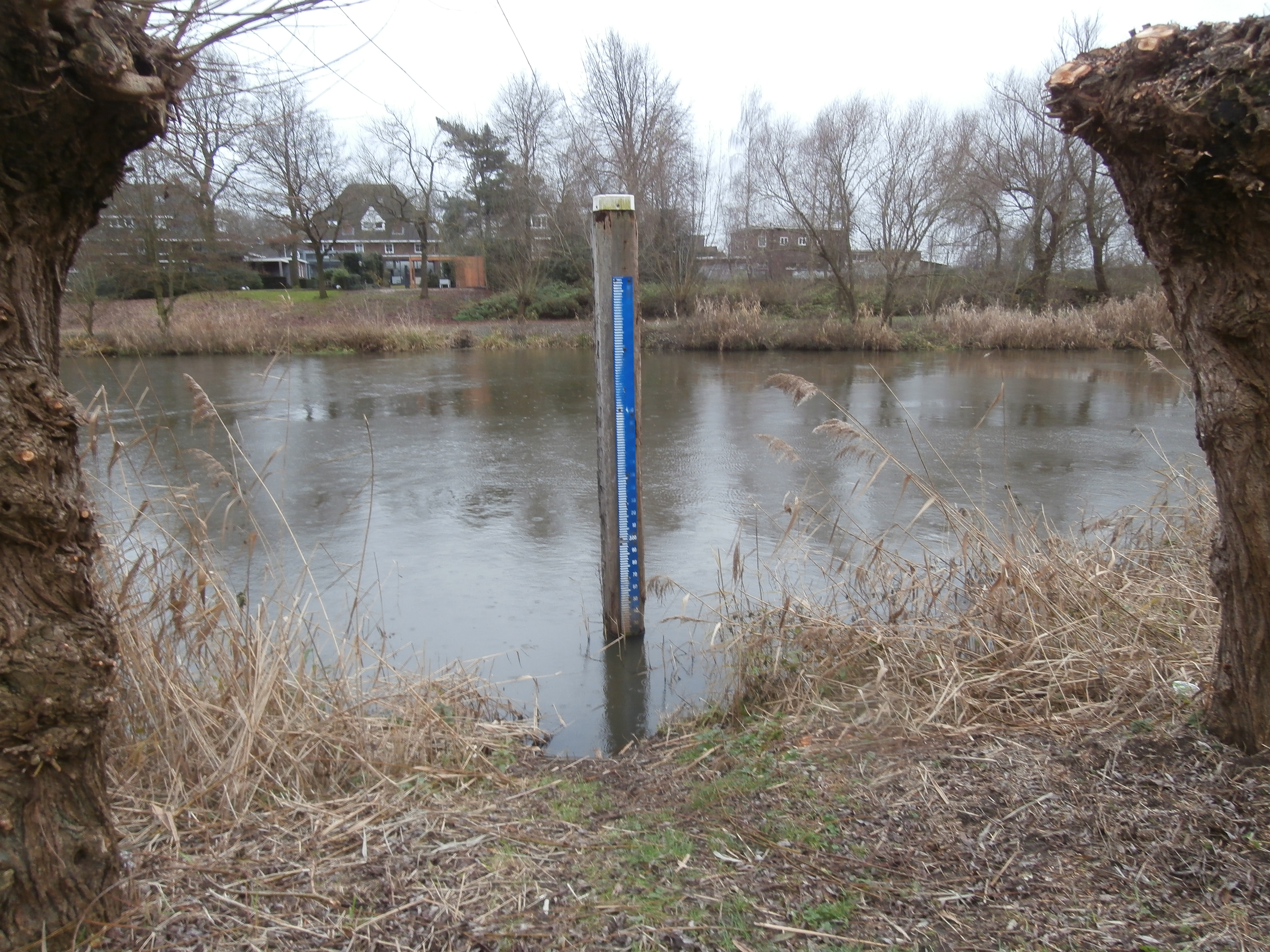
Stream gauge at the start of the Drongelens Canal

The Drongelens Canal starts just south of the old city center of 's-Hertogenbosch. Here the Dommel had been diverted in 1864 to circumvent the city to the west. It does so by running westward for about a hundred meters, crossing the old road bridge to Vught and an overflow. The Dommel then turns northward. The overflow, or threshold in the 1864 Dommel, is not in the Drongelens Canal.

From the westward-northward bend in the 1864 Dommel, the canal runs west for another 100 m, and then to the south. On this stretch, it runs below the railroad bridge. This is the Zestig-Else Bridge, or the concrete bridge that replaced it in 1997. A new highway by-pass Randweg has been constructed right over this bend. About 20 m after turning south, there is another new threshold in the canal. Most of the time this last threshold has only about a foot or so of water on it.

Just between the by-pass and the new threshold is a new movable floodgate.

=== The Zandleij sluice near Cromvoirt ===
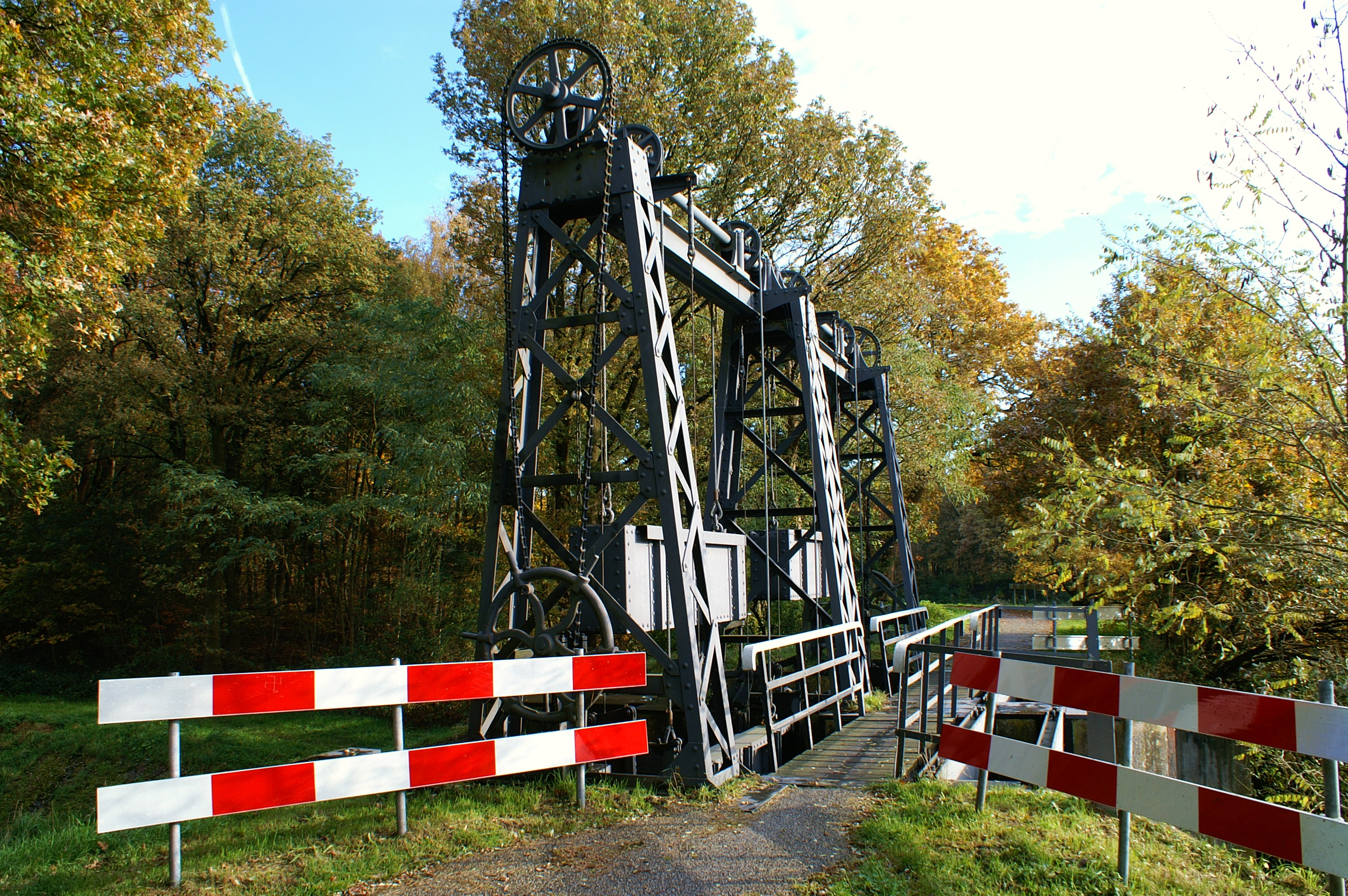
Cromvoirt irrigation sluice

The Zandleij, or Leij, is a small canal or canalized river that originates north of Tilburg. Just west of Cromvoirt it exits into the canal. The farmers north of this exit did not like this new end point for the Zandleij, because it limited their means of irrigation. Therefore, a sluice was constructed just opposite of the new exit, so water from the canal would flow into the bed of the Zandleij north of canal.

The early twentieth century sluice is a beautiful riveted iron structure. It was operated by two big wheels that are connected via cogwheels and chains to two axles high up. These move the doors, that have heavy counterweights to ease operation. On the canal side are some more modern parts. The sluice was tendered in December 1910. In March 1911 preparations were made for constructing a culvert at the site.

=== The Bovenlandse Lock ===
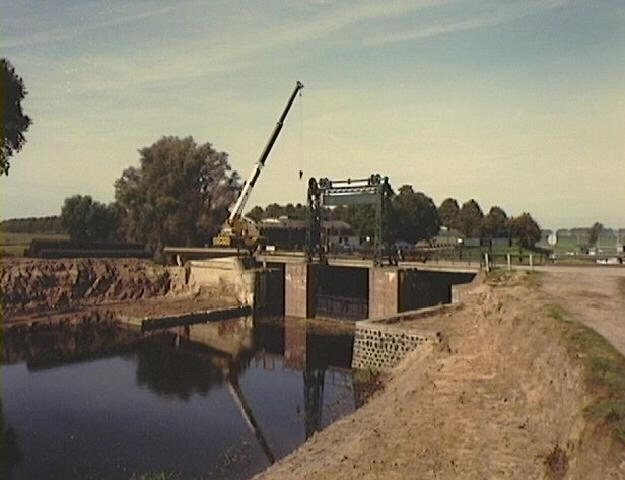
Bovenlandse Lock in 1986

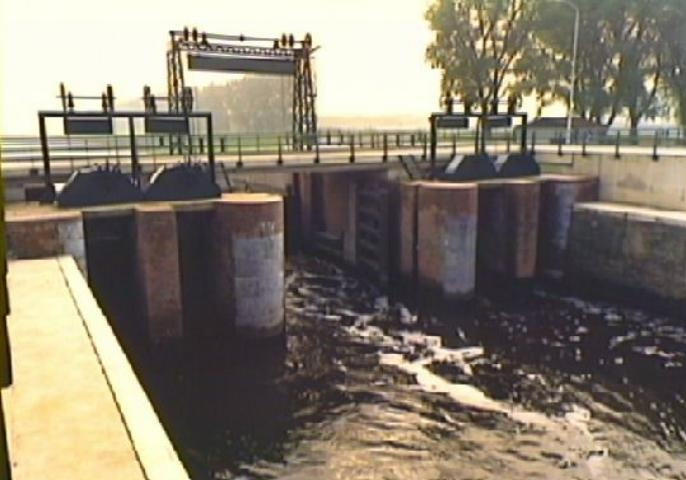
Bovenlandse Lock from the Meuse

The Drongelens Canal exits into the Bergse Maas near Drongelen. Just before doing so, it passes the Bovenlandse Lock Bovenlandse Sluis. The qualification of the Bovenlandse Lock is an interesting matter. It is not a pure lock, because it cannot lift ships by use of a lock chamber. It is also not a sluice, because it has doors instead of only a gate, and ships can pass it. The most obvious classification is that the Bovenlandse Lock is a tidal lock.

Just before exiting into the Bergse Maas, the Drongelens Canal crosses the Oude Maasje. If the canal would connect to the Oude Maasje, it would actually have discharged into it, which would not have been effective. Therefore, a culvert had to be constructed to lead the Oude Maasje below the future canal. It was thought to be more effective to make one structure of the new sluice and the culvert. This would become the Bovenlandse Lock, finished in 1899.

The new lock had a 6 m wide main opening with doors for high and low tide, and also a possibility to close the main opening with beams which were let down in grooves. On each side of this opening were two pure sluices of 1.5 m wide, with a gate sliding in grooves. By this construction, a very precise regulation of the discharge of the canal was possible. In normal circumstances the high and low tide doors could open and close with the tide, and the pure sluices would regulate the discharge. In more demanding circumstances, the beams in the central opening could form a threshold. The flow rate in the canal could thus be limited to 60 cm a second, which was the maximum discharge speed which would not damage the canal's bed and shores.

At the time of construction the idea was that barges could use the lock to transport agricultural produce and needs upstream, by passing it when the water levels allowed. Indeed, steam-powered ships would use it during construction of the canal. Further upstream navigation on the canal was forbidden, even for rowboats.

The current form of the Bovenlandse Lock dates from just after World War II. After the war damage, the lock was rebuilt on the existing foundations. It got a so-called Stoney Sluice-gate, named after F.G.M. Stoney. The lock was renovated between 1986 and 1988, and again in 2017–2018. The latter renovation included a fish passage, and won an award by the Stichting Sluizen en Stuwen Nederland. The award was given for the way the remote controlled operation had been integrated without damaging the monument too much, and for the exposition of parts of the steam engine on the terrace for visitors.

The award might have been the result of how the tender was initiated. Water board Aa & Maas did not make exact specifications of the parts, instead it sketched the desired result. The idea was that this approach would challenge contractors to use their expertise to deliver a high quality solution, instead of the cheapest solution. The project manager of Heijmans agreed that this had indeed allowed the company to deliver better quality.

=== Sports ===
In the 1930s swimming and canoeing matches were regularly organized on the canal near Drunen. Pollution later put an end to such activities. While the pollution has ended, swimming and canoeing have not revived. Cars are not allowed on most of the dykes. Therefore, the canal is popular with cyclists and runners. A peculiarity is that the trail run of Athletics Club Prins Hendrik from Vught crosses the canal by using the new threshold near the 's-Hertogenbosch by-pass.

=== Fishing ===
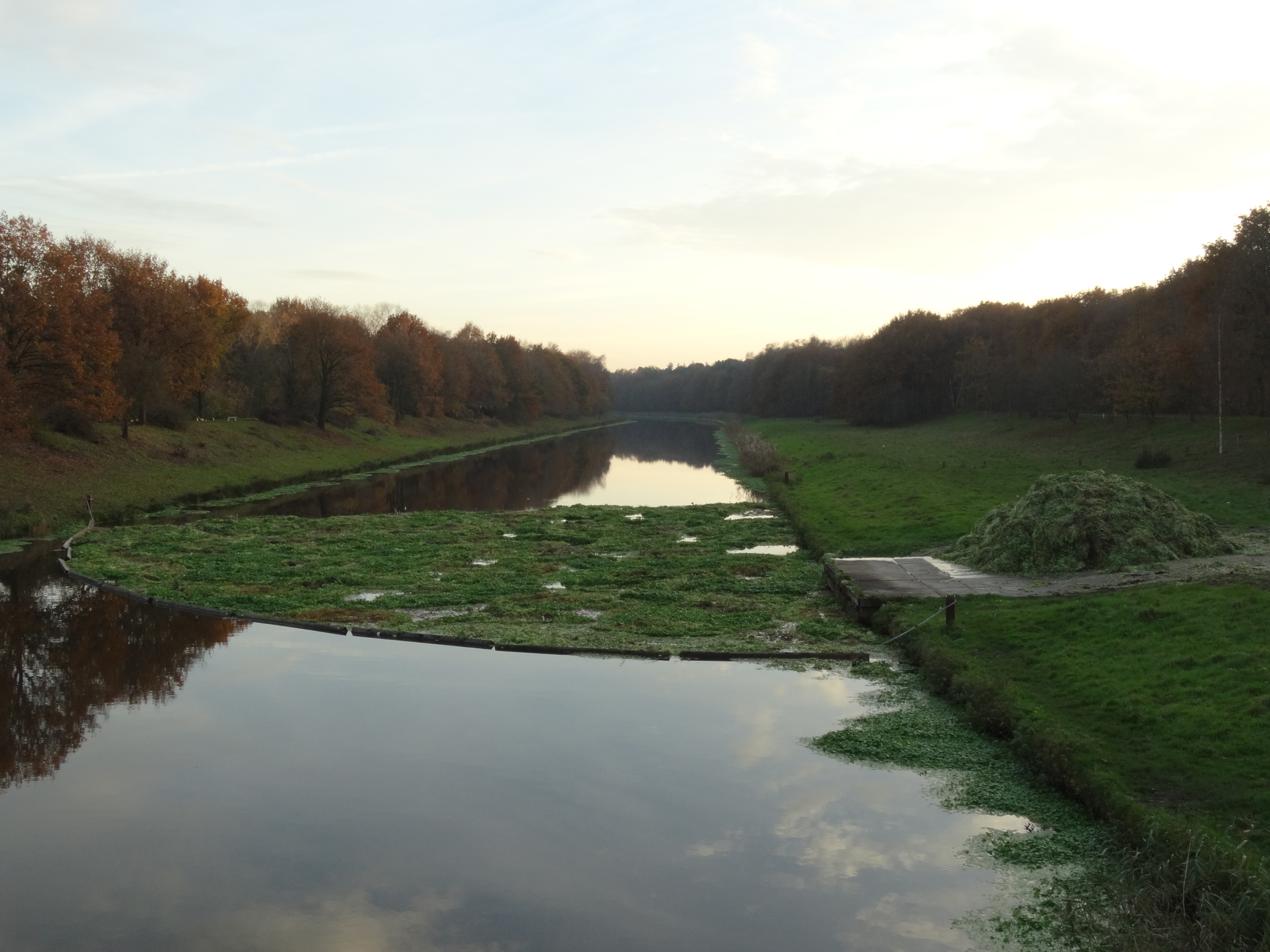
Catching the floating pennywort

Fishing was initially forbidden on the canal. Later the right to fish was leased to fishing clubs. This is still the case. Fishing suffered heavily from pollution. By the 1970s there was hardly any fish left in the canal. The pollution problem has since been solved. Nowadays fishing matches again occur regularly on the canal.

The new threshold is popular with fishermen who want to fly fish from a position in the water.

=== Ecology ===
As is obvious by the presence of many fishermen, fish is plentiful in the canal. This has further improved by making facilities for fish to safely pass the Bovenlandse Sluis. The Drongelens Canal is plagued by the floating pennywort, an invasive exotic plant from North America. At multiple points there are permanent facilities to catch and destroy this plant.

In 2017 Water Board Aa en Maas took the initiative to create an ecological connection zone. It stretches north and south of the canal's crossing with the Highway A59. The specific purpose is that Badger, Spined loach, Scarce large blue, and Wart-biter will profit. Other species that are supposed to thrive on the improvement in habitat are Northern crested newt, Pool frog and Butterflies.
