= Brabantia =

Dutch company

- Brabantia logo as of February 2014
- Industry: Manufacturing
- Founded: 1919
- Headquarters: Valkenswaard, Netherlands
- Key people: Tijn van Elderen, CEO
- Products: Waste bins; Laundry; Food storage; Bathroom; Food preparation utensils
- Number of employees: 1,000
- Website: www.brabantia.com

Brabantia is a privately owned Dutch company which manufactures items for residential use such as waste bins, laundry racks, food storage containers and other products.

== History ==
The company was founded in 1919 in Aalst, North Brabant, Netherlands, under the name Van Elderen & Co, a company specialising in sheet metal fabrication. The name Brabantia is derived from the province of North Brabant, and was an early Van Elderen trade name.

Brabantia offers a range of some 500 houseware products in five core categories: waste storage, food storage, food preparation, laundry care and hardware, which includes post boxes and bathroom accessories. Since 1919, the company has grown and now has four production units employing 1,000 employees across 85 countries. It has an annual turnover of around €150 million.

Brabantia have been making pedal bins, since 1952 and in 2019 it was reported that for each bin sold, the company donates to The Ocean Cleanup. Brabantia offers 10 year guarantees on some products. Still using steel as its prime manufacturing material, as well as a variety of high-grade plastics, products continue to be made in-house in Belgium, Latvia and China, as well as an assembly and finishing plant in Nailsea in the UK.

The company has wholly owned subsidiaries in all key European markets including the United Kingdom, Belgium, France, Germany, Denmark, Switzerland, Spain, Italy and the United States with an export department covering other world markets.

Tijn van Elderen has been the company CEO since 31 January 2012.

In 2023, a distribution partnership was announced between Brabantia and Curve Distribution Services. This deal is expected to expand the availability of Brabantia products in the Canadian market as Curve will list their products with national retailer partners.

== Aims ==
The company markets its products on the basis of their supposed toughness and durability. According to its mission statement, it aims to develop products that are "Designed for Living".
