= Society of Prosperity =

The Society for encouraging prosperity, especially among rural people (Dutch: Maatschappij tot bevordering van Welstand, voornamelijk onder landlieden), later shortened to Society of Prosperity (Dutch: Maatschappij van Welstand), was a Dutch organisation set up in 1822 by Jacob van Heusden, from Hilvarenbeek.
