= Run (stream) =

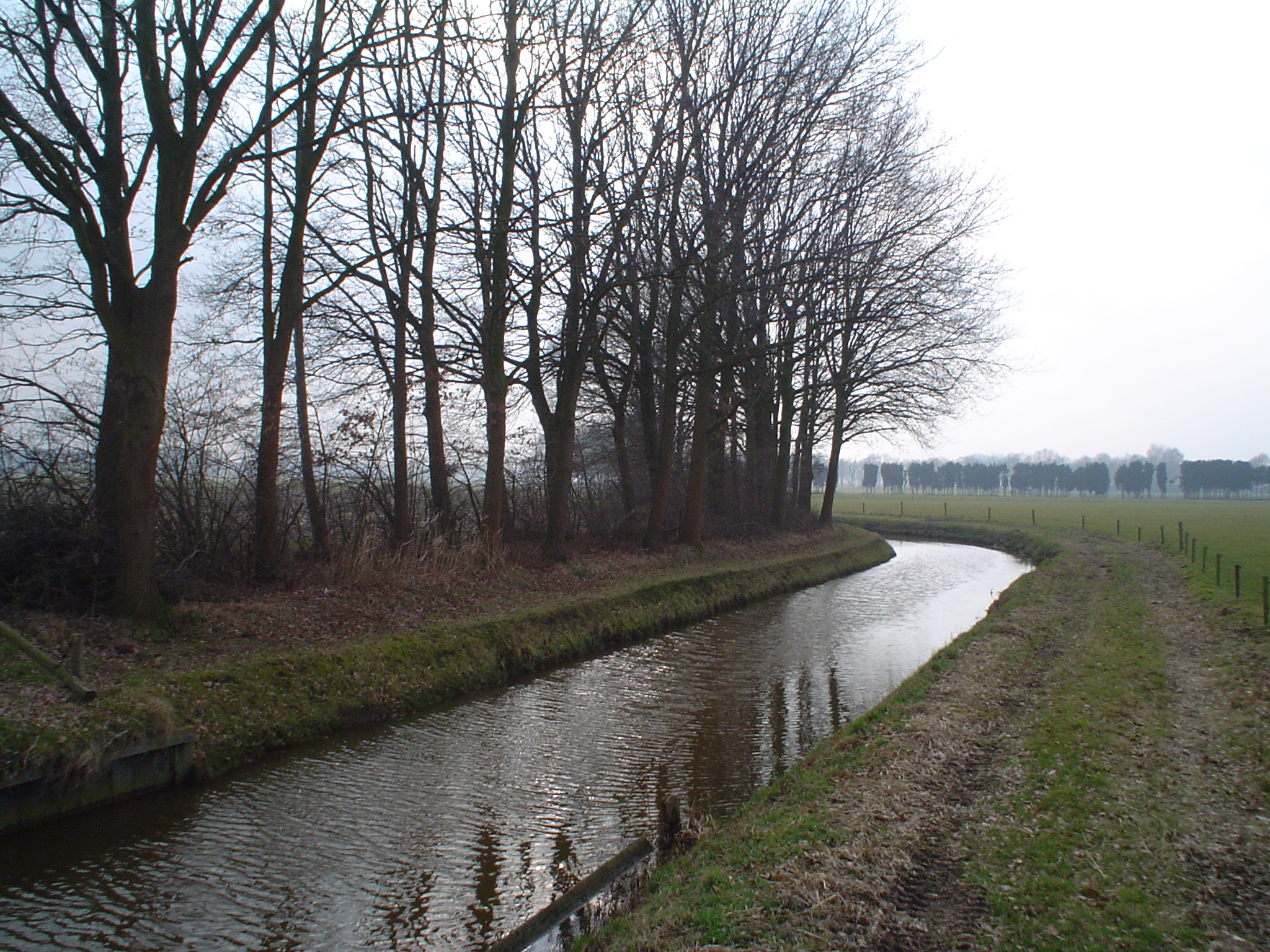
- The Run near the hamlet Heers

Location
- Country: Netherlands

Physical characteristics
- Source
  - location: near Weebosch
  - elevation: 37 m (121 ft)
- Mouth
  - location: Dommel
  - coordinates: 51.3995°N 5.4237°E
  - elevation: 18 m (59 ft)
- Length: 20 km (12 mi)

Basin features
- Progression: Dommel→ Dieze→ Meuse→ North Sea

The Run is a stream in the Dutch province of North Brabant. It is a left tributary of the Dommel and part of the Meuse basin.

The Run originates near the town of Weebosch and flows in a general northeast direction towards Veldhoven. South of Eersel it flows near the hamlets of Stokkelen, Schadewijk and Stevert.

Near the hamlet Stevert used to be a watermill in the Run, which became obsolete in 1969 due to the channelization of the stream. Further downstream the Run passes the hamlet of Heers until it discharges into the Dommel, just south of Veldhoven.
