= Nemerlaer Castle =

- Kasteel Nemerlaer
- Haaren, Netherlands
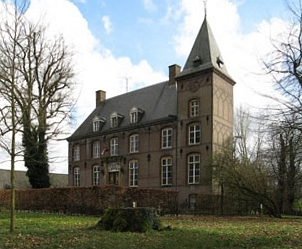
- Nemerlaer Castle

Site information
- Type: Castle
- Open to the public: yes

Location
- Netherlands
- Coordinates: 51°35′21″N 5°13′54″E

Site history
- Built: 1303
- Materials: Brick

Nemerlaer Castle is a 14th-century castle, located in Haaren, Netherlands.

The castle is named after the river Nemer and after Laer which means clearing in the forest. It was first mentioned in 1303, as home of Knight Geerlinck van den Bossche.

Currently the castle is still inhabited. In the basement is a café. In addition there are cultural and public activities, such as exhibitions and concerts. The castle is also used for weddings.
