= Vlierden =

- Village
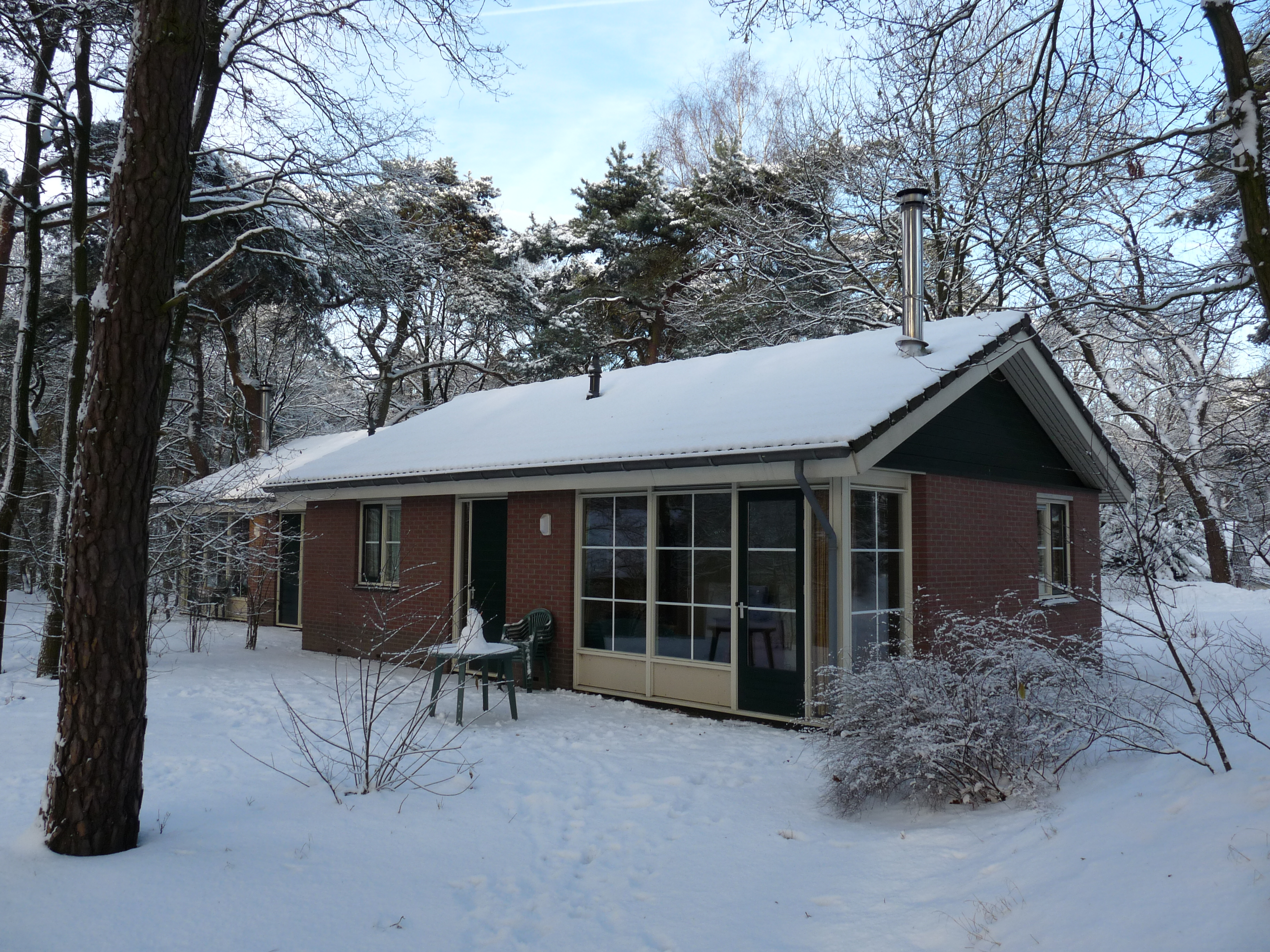
- Holiday home in the snow

- Coat of arms

- Location in the province of North Brabant in the Netherlands Vlierden (Netherlands)
- Coordinates: 51°26′44″N 5°45′29″E
- Country: Netherlands
- Province: North Brabant
- Municipality: Deurne

Area
  - Total: 12.62 km^{2} (4.87 sq mi)
- Elevation: 25 m (82 ft)

Population (2021)
  - Total: 1,440
  - Density: 114/km^{2} (296/sq mi)
- Time zone: UTC+1 (CET)
  - Summer (DST): UTC+2 (CEST)
- Postal code: 5756
- Dialing code: 0493

Vlierden is a village in the Dutch province of North Brabant. It is located in the municipality of Deurne, about 20 km east of Eindhoven.

== History ==
The village was first mentioned in 721 as Fleodrodu(m), and means "settlement near the elderberry (sambucus) trees". Vlierden is an agrarian community from the Early Middle Ages. For a short while, it was a heerlijkheid.

The St Willibrordus was originally built in 1846, and expanded in 1920. It was severely damaged in 1944, and received a new front in 1956.

Vlierden was home to 217 people in 1840. Vlierden was a separate municipality until 1926, when it merged with Deurne en Liessel to form the new municipality "Deurne".

The spoken language is Peellands (an East Brabantian dialect, which is very similar to colloquial Dutch).

== Gallery ==
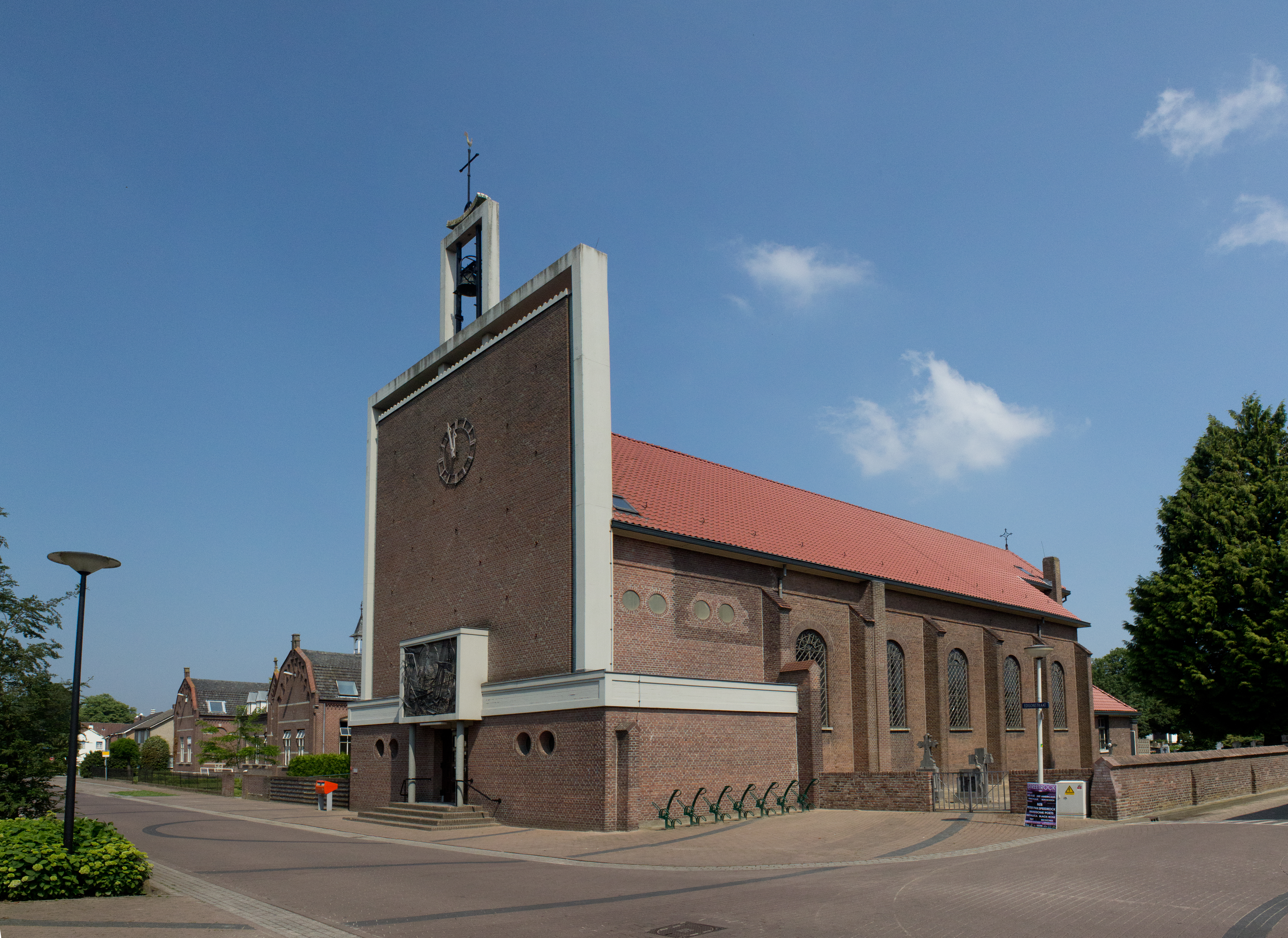
St Willibrordus Church

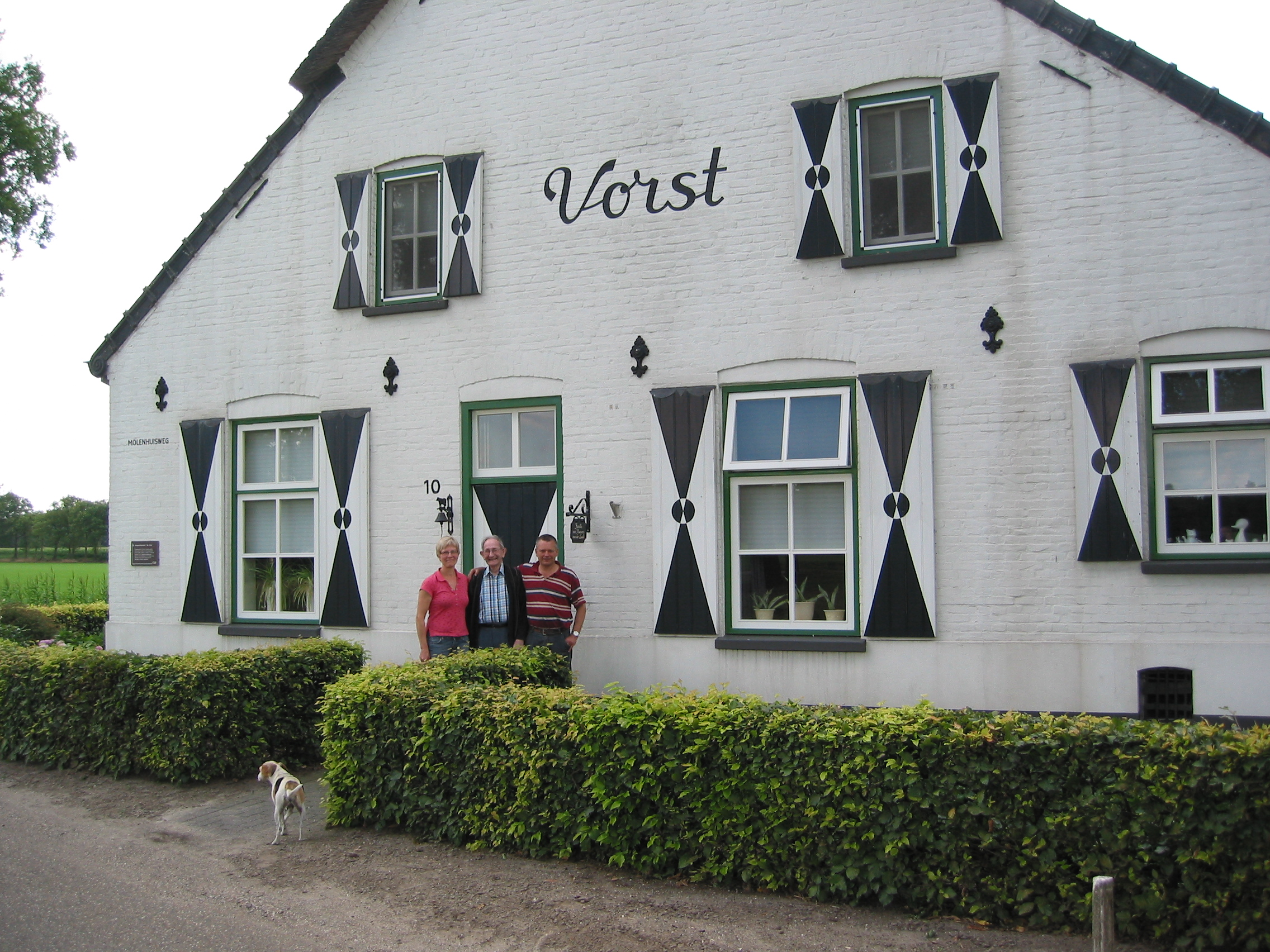
Farm in Vlierden

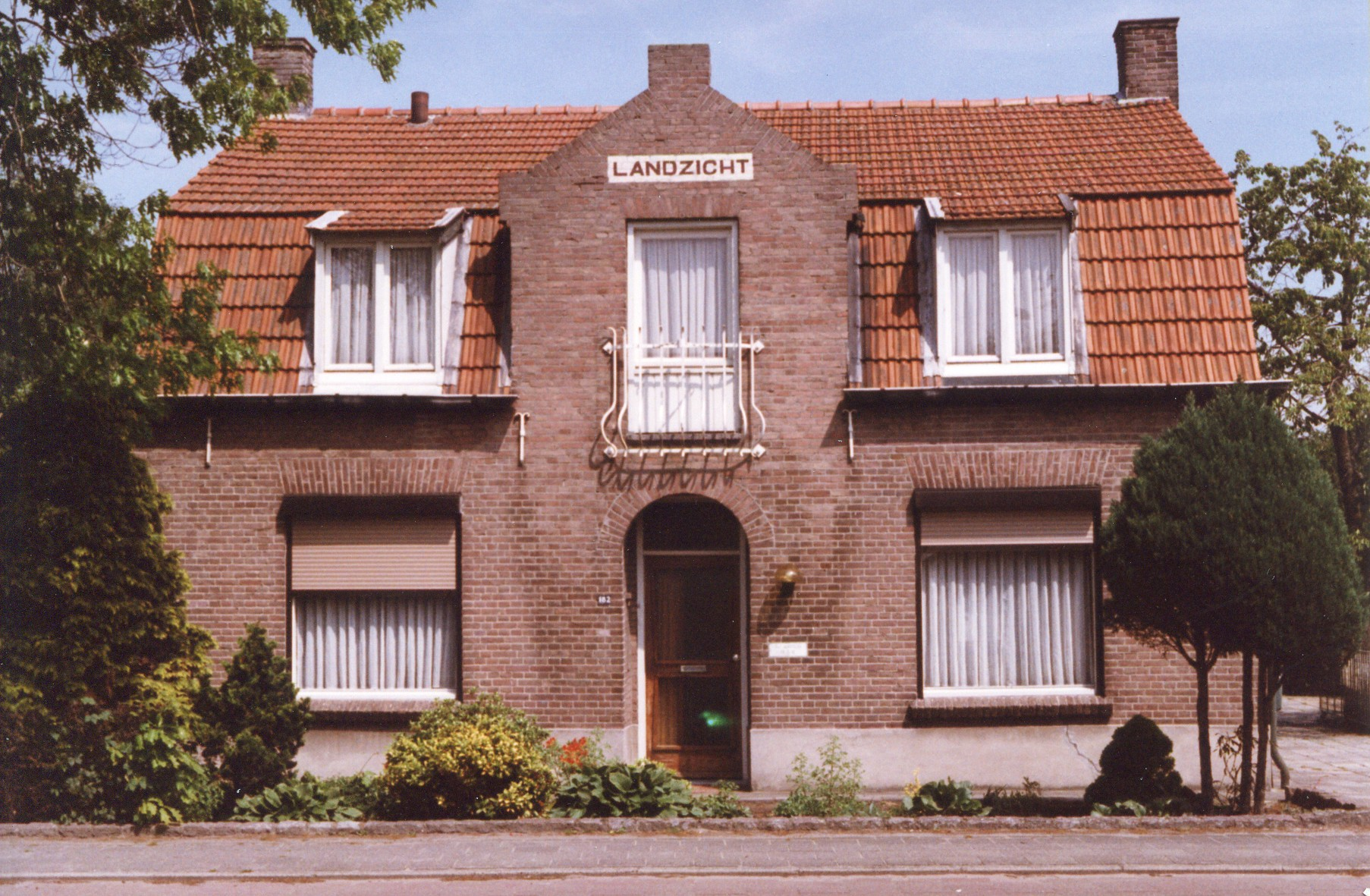
House in Vlierden

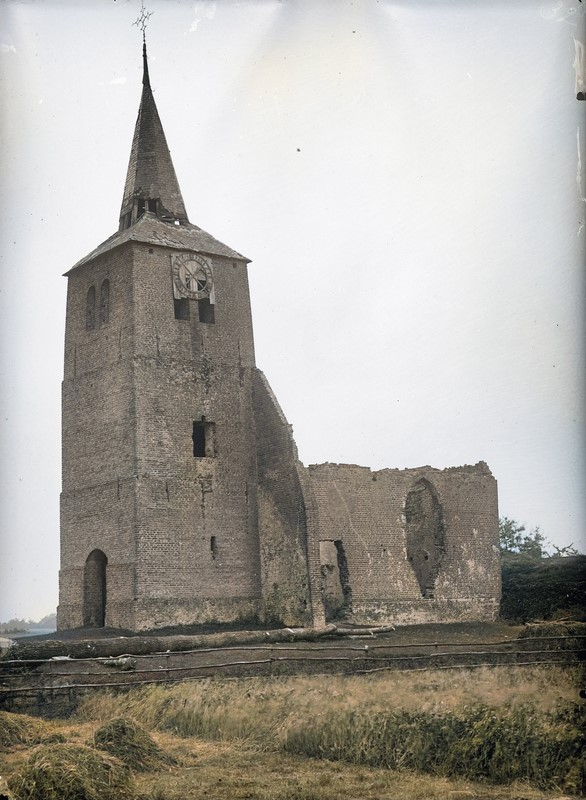
Ruins of the old church
