= Deurne en Liessel =

Former municipality in North Brabant, Netherlands

- Former municipality
- Coat of arms
- Interactive map of Deurne en Liessel
- Coordinates: 51°27′N 5°48′E
- Country: Netherlands
- Province: North Brabant
- Dissolved: 1926

Deurne en Liessel is a former municipality in the Dutch province of North Brabant. It contained the villages of Deurne and Liessel.

Deurne en Liessel merged in 1926 with the municipality of Vlierden, to form the new municipality of "Deurne".

The spoken language is Peellands (an East Brabantian dialect, which is very similar to colloquial Dutch).
