= Geelders =

Coordinates: 51°35′58″N 5°22′46″E

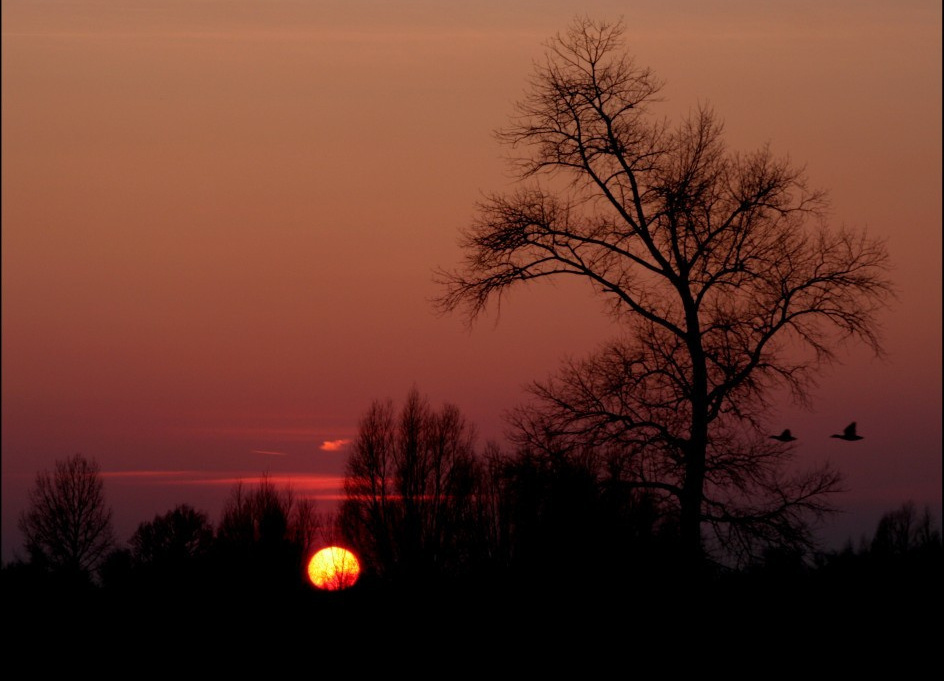
Sunset in the Geelders, Olland, Sint-Oedenrode

The forest and nature area the Geelders is located at the western side of the village of Olland in Meierijstad, North Brabant and covers almost 300 hectares. The Geelders are part of the larger area Het Groene Woud.

The varied landscape of the Geelders consists of coppice hedges, with deciduous forests with drover's roads, poplars, heathland, grassland and farmland. Already in the 17th century was the area used for the production of oak coppice.

The bark of trees was used in the tannery. In order to exploit the forest as well as possible there were wide drover's roads constructed. For an extensive system of drainage there were ditches and trenches constructed. On the available new land there were rabatten made, which are the higher ground ridges between the trenches which were used for silviculture.

Cavities in old and often declining trees are grateful breeding and hiding places for tawny owls and beech martens. In spring the forest soils are covered with millions of wood anemones, which are pleasing to the eye. The clay layer keeps the area quite wet and as result there can be found rare plants like true lover's knot, Dactylorhiza maculata, royal fern and primrose. Also native specimens of wild medlar, Guelder rose, dog rose and hawthorn can be found in the area.

For more than 100 years an important part of the property is owned by the family Marggraff from Vught. Since the Second World War, the main management by this family consisted out of doing nothing. As a result of the lack of human interference, the Geelders is in a high natural state and is now one of the most valuable wetlands in the Netherlands.

Staatsbosbeheer has marked several trails through the Geelders.
