= Sint-Oedenrode =

- Town
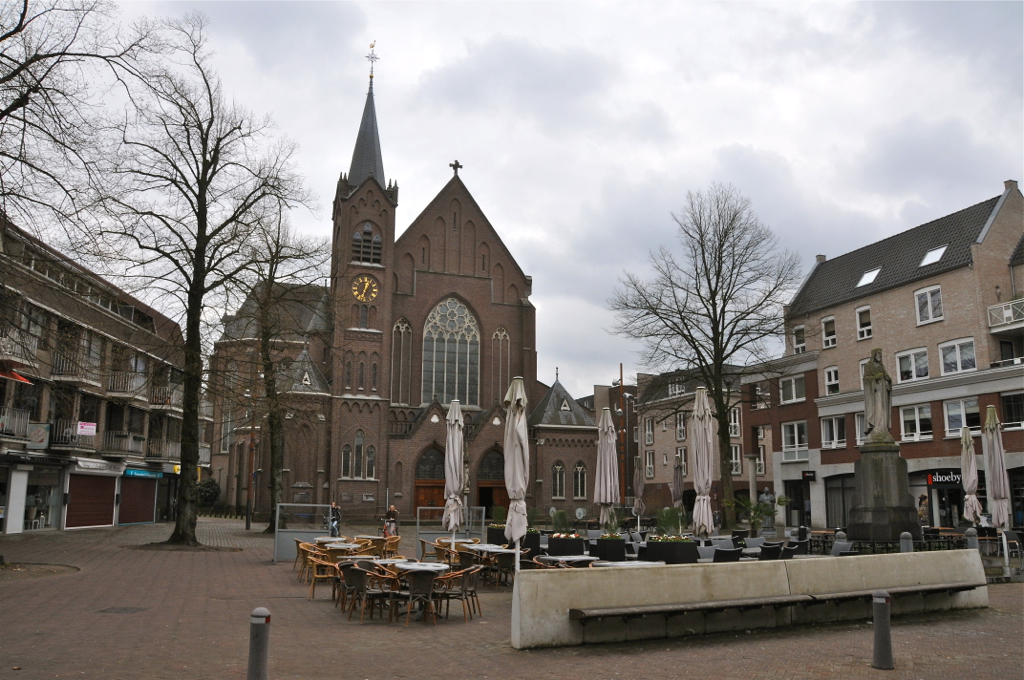
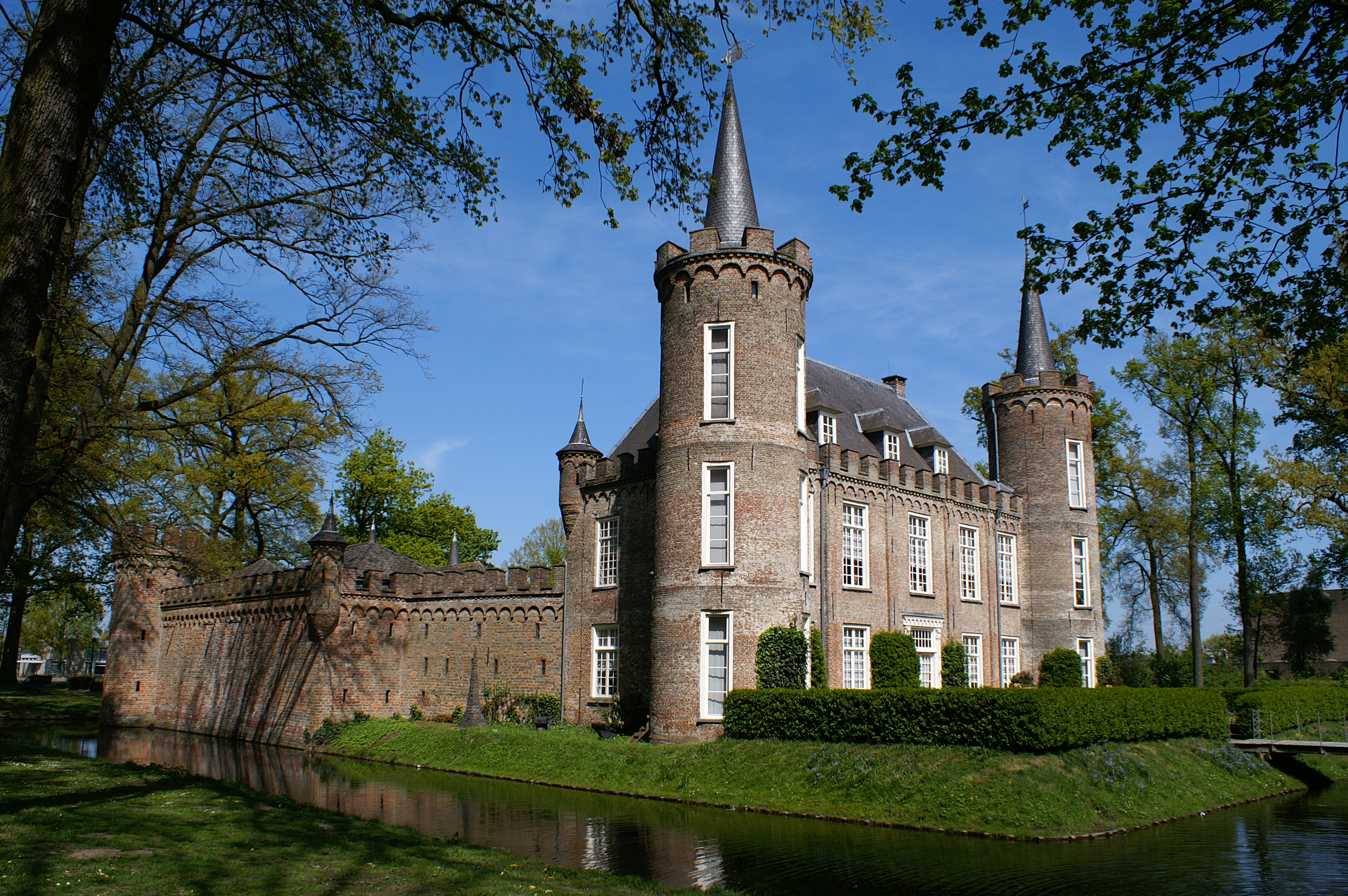
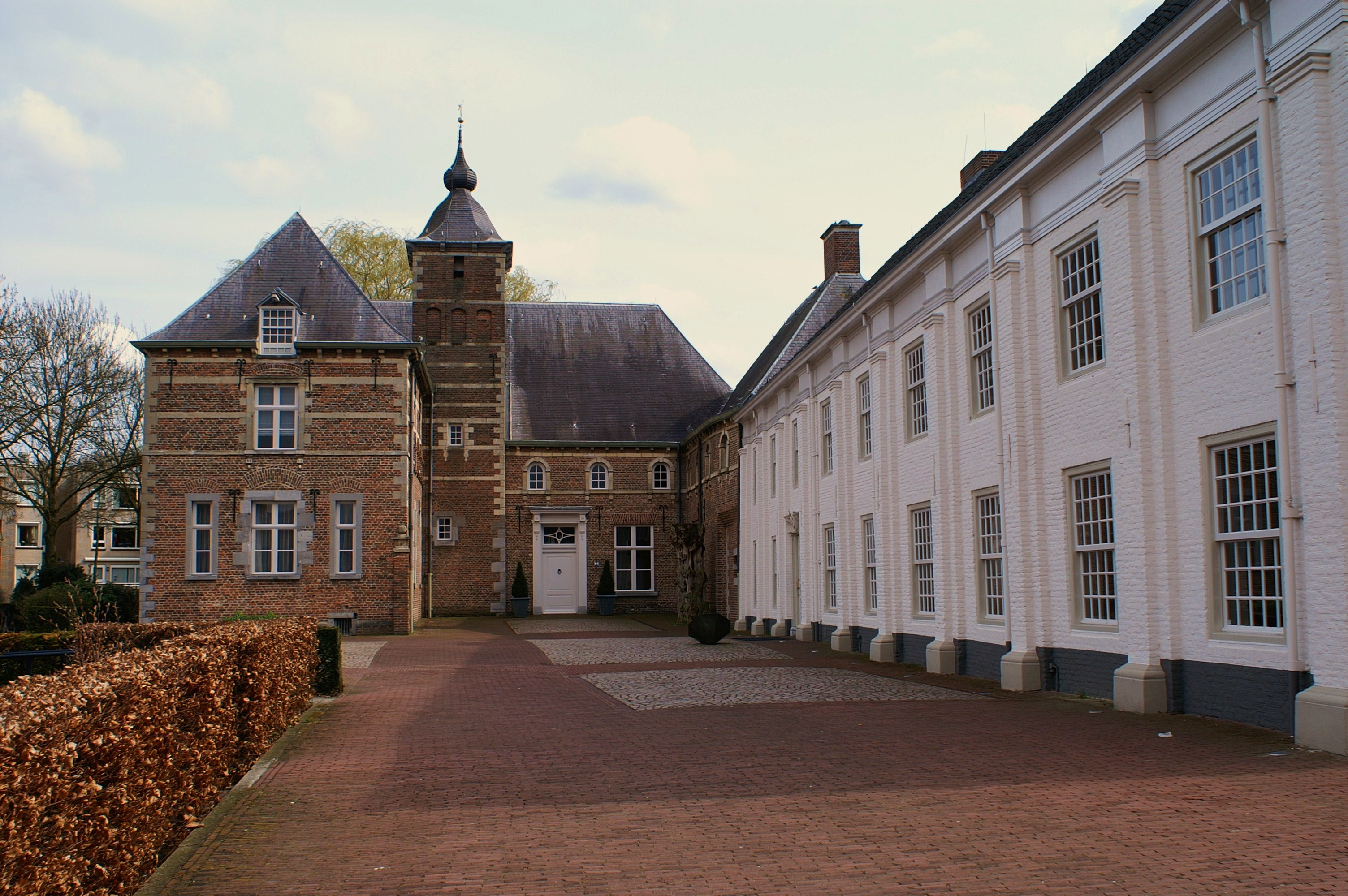
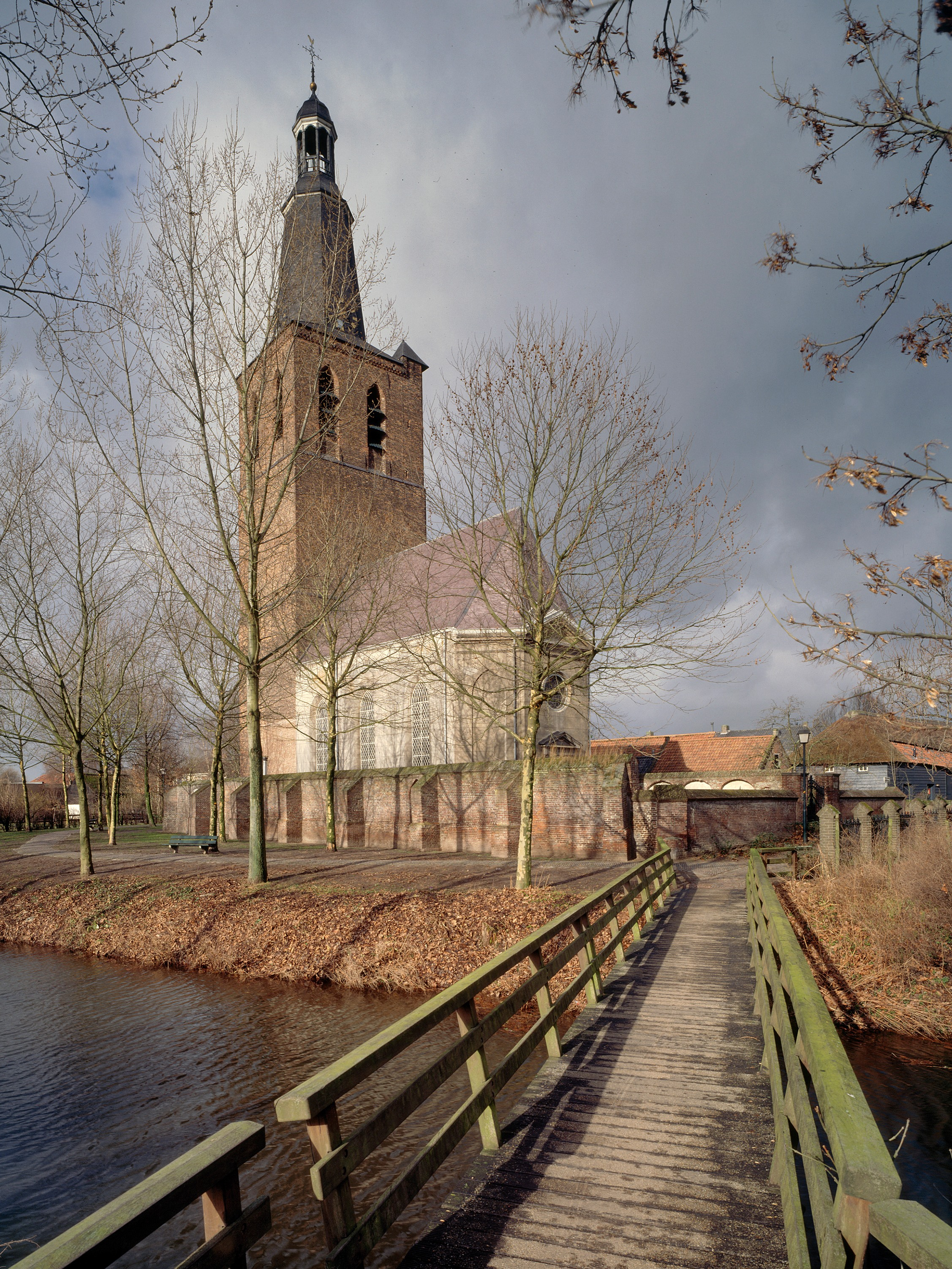
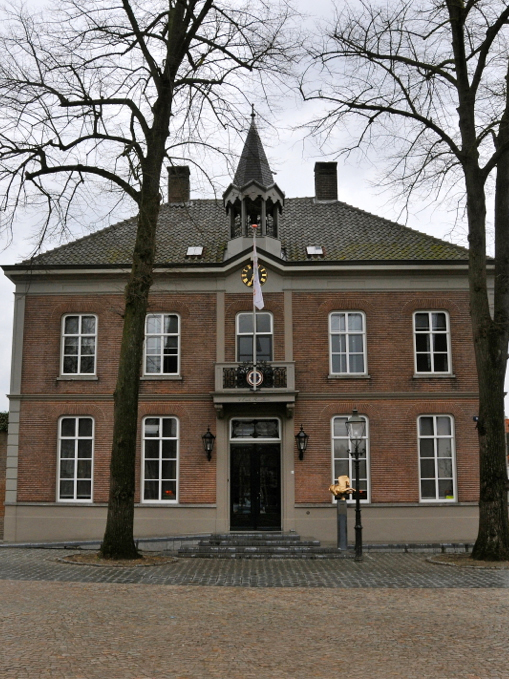
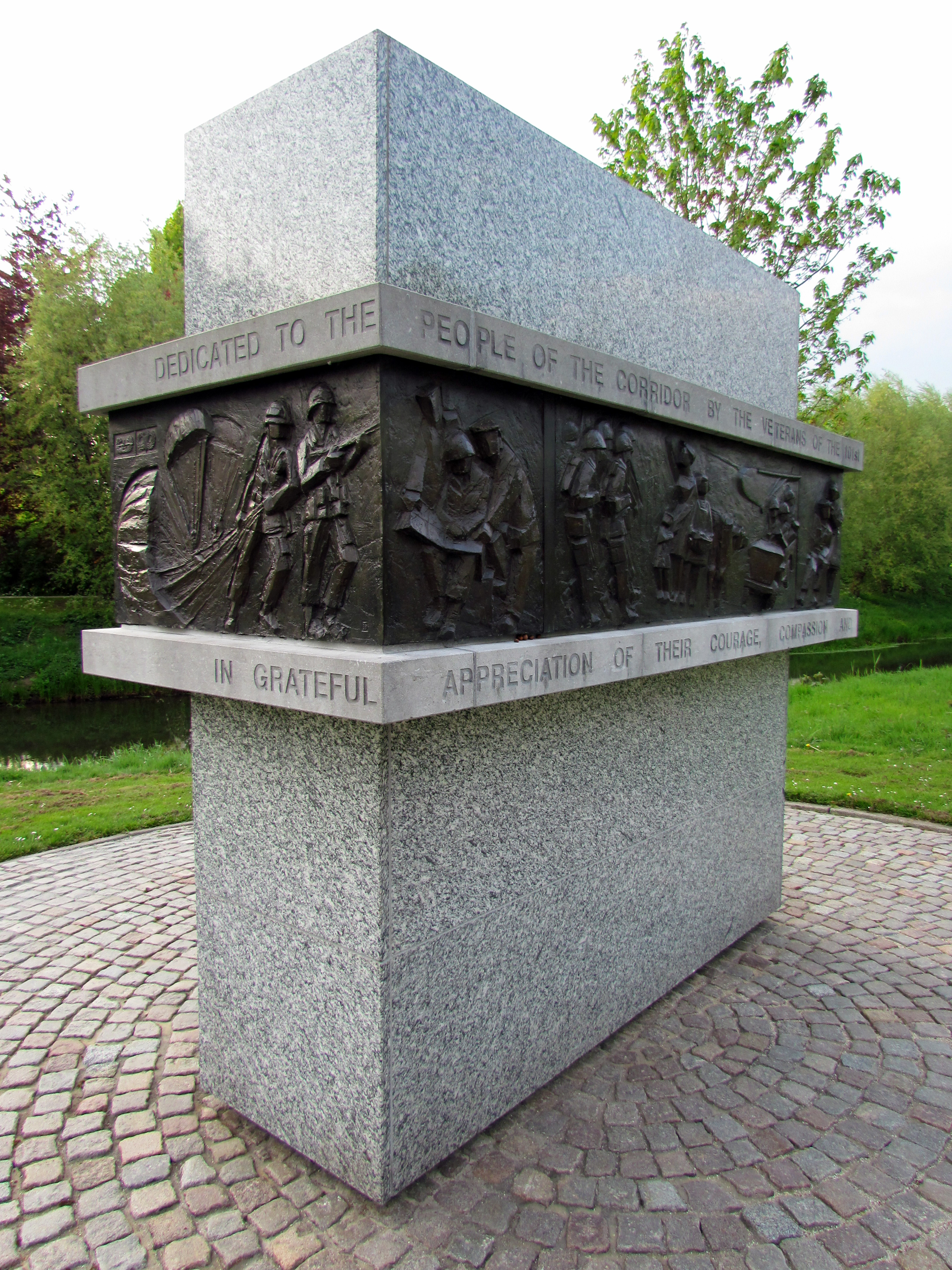
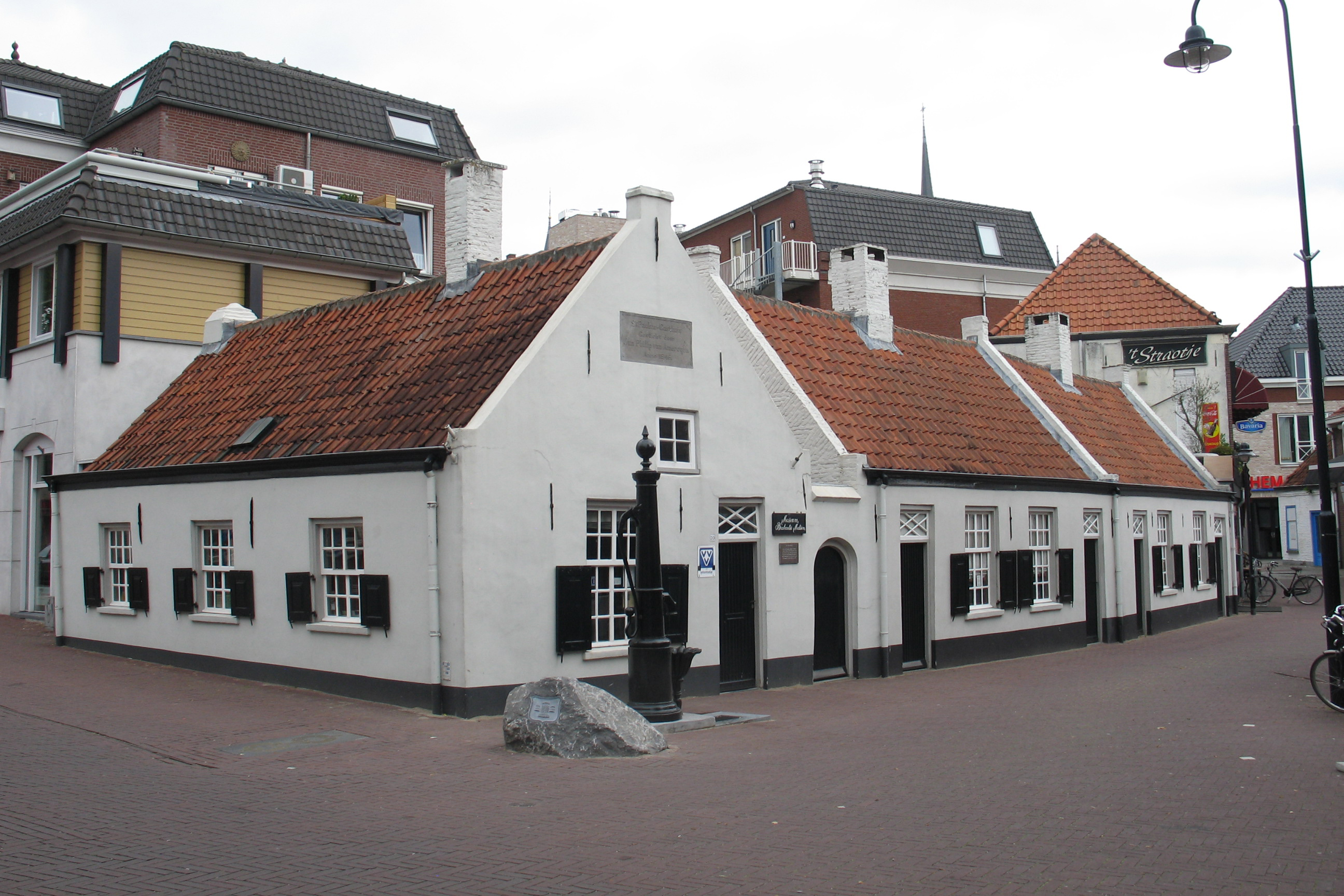
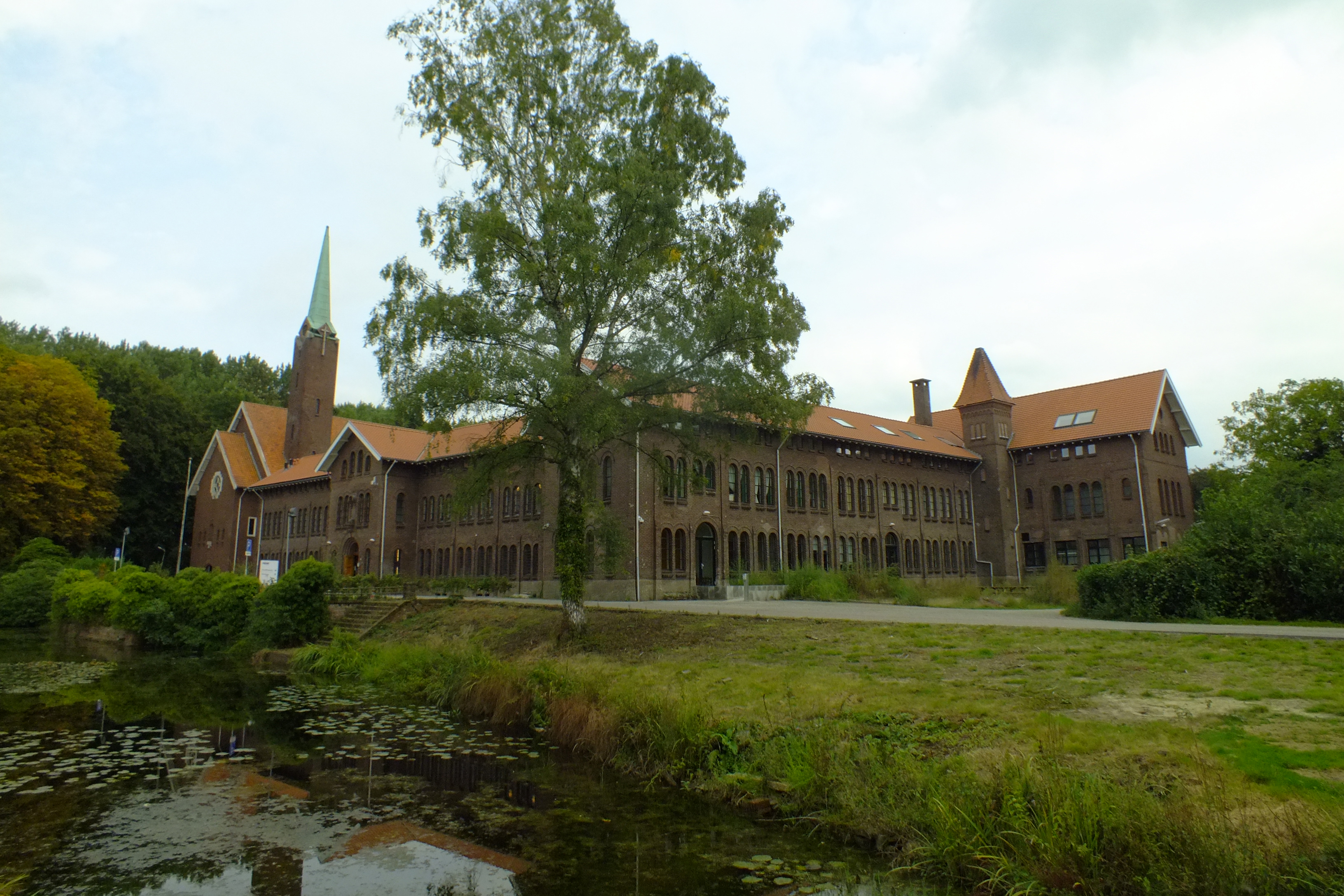
- From top down, left to right: St. Martin Church square, Henkenshage Castle, Dommelrode Castle and town hall, Knop Tower, former town hall, Monument to the Dutch, St. Paulus Hospice AD 1434, St. Damien Seminary

- Flag Coat of arms

- Location in the province of North Brabant in the Netherlands Sint-Oedenrode (Netherlands)
- Coordinates: 51°34′N 5°28′E
- Country: Netherlands
- Province: North Brabant
- Municipality: Meierijstad
- Merged: 2017

Area
  - Municipality: 64.94 km^{2} (25.07 sq mi)
- Elevation: 11 m (36 ft)

Population (2021)
  - Municipality: 18,360
  - Density: 282.7/km^{2} (732.2/sq mi)
- Time zone: UTC+1 (CET)
  - Summer (DST): UTC+2 (CEST)
- Postcode: 5490–5492
- Area code: 0413
- Market rights: AD 1232
- Website: www.sint-oedenrode.nl

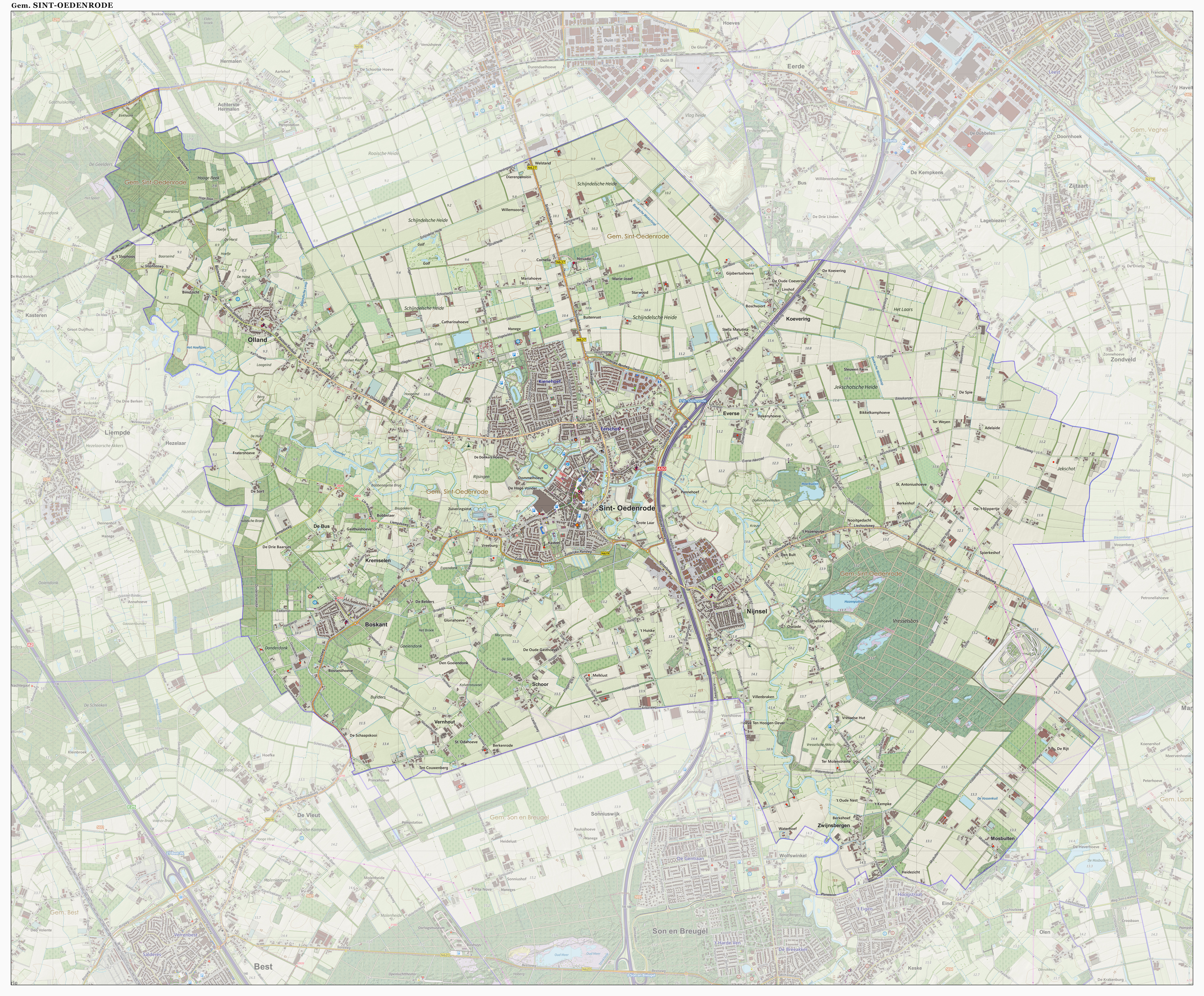
Dutch Topographic map of Sint-Oedenrode, June 2015

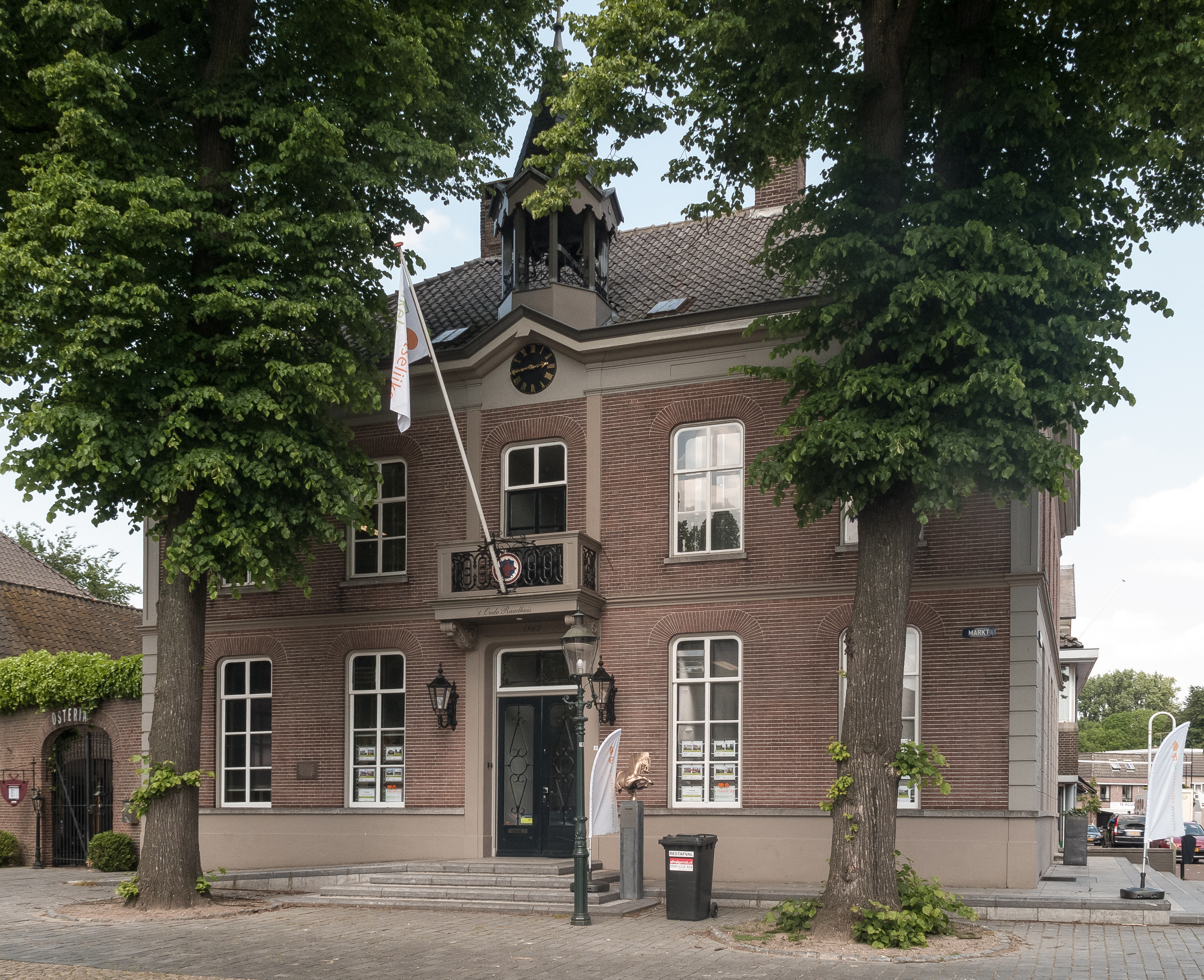
Sint Oedenrode, former town hall

Sint-Oedenrode (Dutch pronunciation: [sɪnt ˈudə(n)roːdə]) is a town in the Dutch province of North Brabant.

Sint-Oedenrode is a moderately urbanized town in the Meierij of 's-Hertogenbosch. Sint-Oedenrode had a population of 18,360 as of 2026 and has an area of 64.94 km^{2} (25.07 sq mi). On 1 January 2017 Sint-Oedenrode, together with Schijndel and Veghel, merged into a new municipality called Meierijstad, creating the largest municipality of the North-Brabant province in terms of land area.

The municipality traditionally had "vrijheidsrechten" (a predecessor of city rights), since 1232, until the abolishment of the privileges and introduction of the Municipalities Act in 1851. In those feudal times Sint-Oedenrode was referred to as a "Vlek" (market town). Today it is still a large town. From southeast to northwest, the town is split by the river Dommel.

== Population centers ==
The municipality Sint-Oedenrode consists of several quarters and hamlets:

- 11 quarters in Sint-Oedenrode and 3 hamlets ("Everse", "Koevering" and "Kremselen")
- 1 quarter in Boskant and 3 hamlets ("De Bus", "Scheeken Vernhout" and "De Bunders")
- 1 quarter in Olland and 1 hamlet ("Houthem")
- 1 quarter in Nijnsel and 2 hamlets ("Vressel" and "Zwijnsbergen")

The town of Sint-Oedenrode consist of two historical urban cores: "Sint-Oedenrode" and "Eerschot", which are separated by the Dommel.

== The origin of the name 'Sint-Oedenrode' ==
According to legend, Sint-Oedenrode owes its name to Saint Oda. The saga goes as follows: This woman was a mythical blind-born Scottish, possibly Irish, daughter of king Eugenius VII, who around the year 700, along with a servant was sent on a pilgrimage on the mainland by her father. Oda's blindness was miraculously cured after she visited the tomb of Saint Lambert of Maastricht in Liège. She decided she wanted to devote her life to the Christian God as a nun. She returned to her father who had decided a husband for her. Oda did not wish to marry as was her father's wish. In a desperate attempt to not marry, she decided to flee to the mainland. She started to travel from one place to another, wherever she could find silence for worshipping. Her worship was repeatedly disrupted by magpies, and she fled from the birds. Eventually she arrived in Toxandria (Austrasia) in a little settlement called Rode (old Dutch word for a man-made open place in the woods), where the villagers built her a hut on the heath and she settled there as a hermit. After she died in 726 A.D. the villagers were getting pilgrims from the entire region, and started to call the place Sint-Oda's-Rode, which became Sint-Oedenrode in present-day speaking.

== History ==
=== World War II ===
During the World War II Sint-Oedenrode suffered tremendously. In May 1940 the German Army invaded the Low Countries and France, and due to the retreat from the Peel-Raam Line by the Dutch Armed Forces skirmishes arose in Sint-Oedenrode in an attempt to keep the enemy at bay. After the capitulation (15 May 1940, in Zeeland 2 days later) Sint-Oedenrode found itself under German occupation. There was a small German Luftwaffe detachment of about 15 people providing a manned look-out (just like the Royal Observer Corps) for Allied planes which were undertaking operations against Volkel Air Base and Eindhoven (Air Base Welschap, now Eindhoven Airport).

During the final months of occupation, the mayor (appointed by Queen Wilhelmina) was sacked and replaced by a pro-German mayor. The reasons for the sacking were that the central Distribution Office was plundered from blank distribution cards that were necessary to get coupons for males who were hiding from the Arbeitseinsatz (compulsory labour in the German war industry) and were using fake names. Also the mayor tried to sabotage the arbeitseinsatz.

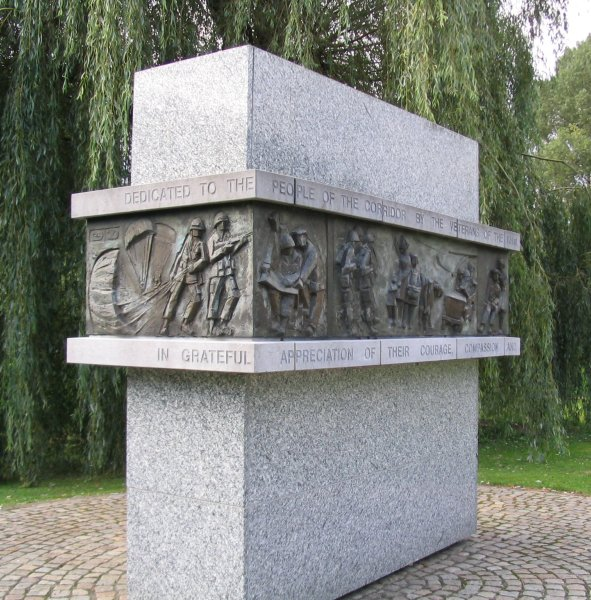
Monument to the Dutch

With the beginning of Operation Market Garden in September 1944, Sint-Oedenrode found itself on an important location between the Allied landing zones in Son and Veghel. General Dwight D. Eisenhower and Field Marshal Bernard Montgomery had the important task to keep the corridor (which ran through Sint-Oedenrode) open for the passage of the British XXX Corps to conquer Nijmegen. The US 101st Airborne Division liberated the Town of Sint-Oedenrode (the 'Market' part) after para droppings in the fields in the vicinity. They were followed by the British XXX Army Corps (the 'Garden' part). For a brief time the 18th-century castle Henkenshage was used as allied HQ.

The British left 150 comrades behind, the Americans 125. Twenty-two British soldiers are buried at the General Cemetery in Sint-Oedenrode. Most of the British are reburied at the Uden War Cemetery and some did find their final resting place in Mierlo. The Americans who were originally buried in Wolfswinkel (Son en Breugel) are reburied in Margraten or the US.

On 16 September 1994 101st Airborne veterans revealed a war monument 'Monument for the Dutch'. The monument is a gift from the veterans to the civilians who fought alongside of the US troops, much to surprise and relief of the US soldiers. The inscription on the monument is in English and reads "Dedicated to the people of the Corridor by the veterans of the 101st Airborne Division, in grateful appreciation of their courage, compassion and friendship". The monument can be found alongside the road 'Corridor' which was constructed after the war between key points of the actual Corridor: the allied supply route from Eindhoven to Nijmegen.

=== Post-war era ===
In the twentieth century mainly the growth of N.V. ODA Steel Works and Ovenbouw v/h H.J. van de Kamp, later N.V. ODA Steel Furniture (now part of the multinational Royal Ahrend) created employment in Sint-Oedenrode. Sint-Oedenrode is regularly erroneously referred to as rural municipality. As a former market town the urbanization had already begun at the end of the 19th and early 20th centuries. The excessive urbanization is evident from the fact that in 1930 already more than half of the population was not engaged in agriculture. After neighboring municipalities Schijndel and Veghel, Sint-Oedenrode was at the time the third most industrialized town of eastern North-Brabant. Around 1950 Sint-Oedenrode lost its third place to Uden, which began to develop quickly after it was designated as a core congregation. In 1956 only 30% of the inhabitants of Sint-Oedenrode was involved in agriculture.

== Urban development ==
Sint-Oedenrode is traditionally a large town. Towns like this, which had already before 1850 more than just local significance, are referred to as "vlek" (market town) or "vrijheerlijkheid". These kind of towns often show a mix of historical origin and growth factors. Usually these settlements date back to the Middle Ages and were the primary parishes with a market function, attested by the presence of a square. In St. Oedenrode this is clearly recognizable in the current market square. The oldest buildings of St. Oedenrode were concentrated around "'t Sant", and the centre moved later to the current market square, where the function as a transit town led to a widening of the main road and the town's development into a linear settlement. Fairs were held at the market square, especially for livestock and dairy products.

Early 19th century the sacristan Brock describes his birthplace Sint-Oedenrode as follows:

Dit laatsten, van ouds zoo vermaard Vlek, is thans weinig meer dan een middelmatig dorp der Meierij, bestaande uit weinig meer dan 150 afzonderlyke huizen, die een enkele straat formeert, verdeeld in den Heuvel, de Markt, het Moleneind, welke digt betimmert zyn, en den Dyk, zynde dat gedeelte naar de zyde van Eerschot tot aan de Dommel, waar de huizen meer verspreid liggen, niet aanzienlyk zyn, als in het overige gedeelte. Aan de Markt, waar het Raadhuis midden op ligt, en waar men van vooren één schoonen lindenboom, en agter eenen grooten ronden poel aantreft, zijn er de huizen op stadswijze gebouwd, en leverd een fraaij gezigt op.

"This last, traditionally so renowned "Vlek", is now little more than a mediocre village of the Meierij, consisting of little more than 150 separate houses, which forms a single street, divided into "de Heuvel", the Market, the "Moleneind" which are densely housed, and "de Dijk", being the part of Eerschot till the Dommel, where the houses are more scattered and are not considerable, as in the other part of town. At the Market, where the town hall is situated in the middle, and where one can find one beautiful linden tree in the front, and a large round pool in the back, there are houses build in the urban way, which looks very fine"

The description indicates that despite the minimal growth in the past few centuries, Sint-Oedenrode has retained its as it were urban allure in its old centers. For the most part the town kept a very rural character, in which an alternating ribbon of workers houses, farmhouses and manors defined the towns image. This street in the old town has been quite well maintained to this date.

The center of Sint-Oedenrode been developed in recent years into a pleasant residential area. In total, the shopping area is almost 25.000m2. More than 40 percent of these shops ar in the center of Sint-Oedenrode. Sint-Oedenrode is mainly a shopping center for people from the own community who shop for groceries. A relatively large proportion of the sales volume ( 64% ) consists of retail and horeca expenditure by the inhabitants of the municipality itself. The town is only to a limited extent able to attract customers from other parts of the country. Within the region, in particular the relationship with Son en Breugel appears to be strong. The inhabitants of Veghel and Boxtel are an important group of customers for the retail and horeca in Sint-Oedenrode as well. The inhabitants of Sint-Oedenrode go to regional shopping centers in Schijndel, Veghel themselves as well. However, especially Eindhoven has a strong attraction to Sint-Oedenrode and the entire region : 17% of spending outside the village by residents from Stint-Oedenrode is done in Eindhoven.

== Landscape development ==
Sint-Oedenrode originated on the banks of the river the Dommel. The presence of this river has left a mark on the development of the landscape and the main parts of the town. The valley landscape with meadows, pastures and small landscape elements such as steep edges and pools was fairly open. The higher, cultivated fields formed with its gibbous fields, hawthorn hedges and wooden windbreaks a more closed landscape. In the late 13th century, the Dukes of Brabant were about to issue a perpetual lease of common grounds. For example, in 1314 the lease issued the "Bodem van Elde". This vast humid forest and heathland was virtually uninhabitable. The border of this congregation, which was located between Sint Michielsgestel, Boxtel, Schijndel, Sint-Oedenrode and Liempde, was formed by the river the Dommel. The commissioning of the Bodem of Elde led to the emergence of the characteristic gibbous fields in this part of the Meierij. Some of these fields in this area existed for centuries in the same form and can nowadays be very well identified by their unchanged shape. On some of the parts with very loamy soils in Sint-Oedenrode there were many poplars planted from 1750 on. Between 1760 and 1780 the largest increase in silviculture took place in the municipalities Schijndel, Sint-Oedenrode, Veghel and Udenhout. Following the planting of poplars, the pattern of sand paths and wet stream valley soils were formed which characterizes the Meierijs "Poplar Landscape" till this day. This landscape was in fact purely economic, since the poplar cultivation served the clog industry. The core of this clog industry, and therefore of the poplar cultivation, was mainly formed by the municipalities Sint-Oedenrode, Schijndel, Veghel, Liempde, Best and Boxtel. In the nineteenth century Sint-Oedenrode grew again because of this industry, which reached its peak in the first half of the 20th century. The reclamation of the remaining waste land known as the Schijndelse Heath, especially the Kienehoef, took place since the 18th century.

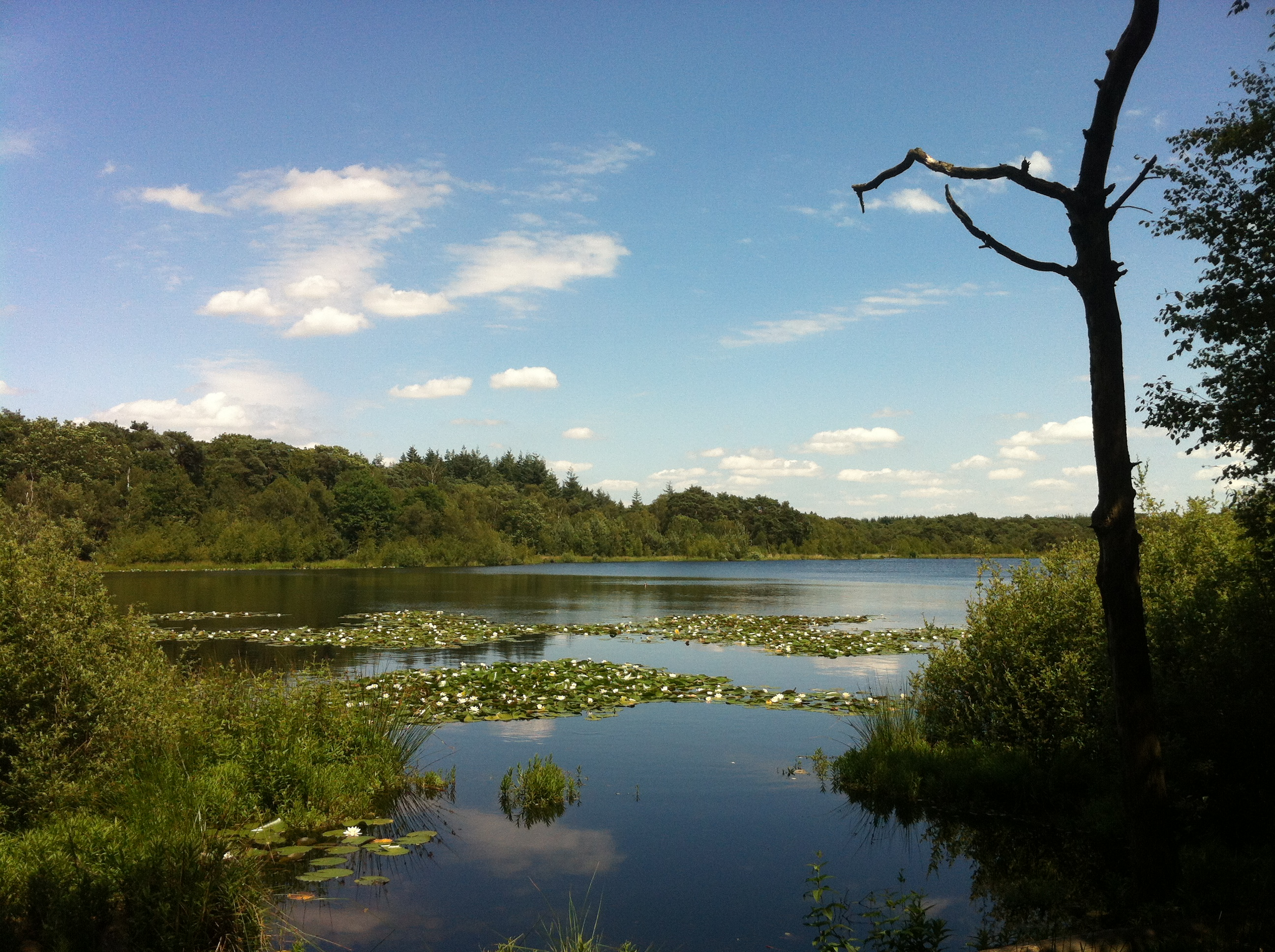
The fen the "Hazenputten" in the "Vresselse Bossen"

== Nature and Parks ==
Most nature in Sint-Oedenrode is located in the Dommeldal (valley of the Dommel river). The most original part and natural state of the Dommel can be found between Eindhoven and Boxtel and hence in Sint-Oedenrode. Here the Dommel has still its original winds and meanders and forms a cultural-historical and valuable landscape area.

In addition there is the park of the Castle Henkenshage with large oak trees, designed by Leonard Springer. This park borders the area Diependaal. Originally Diependaal was a poplar planting to accommodate the wood for the clog industry, and is now being transformed into a more natural forest.

North of Sint-Oedenrode is also a heath-area. Here was formerly the Schijndel Heath. North of the Schijndelse Heath lie the Marggraff Forests. This is a deciduous forest measuring 85 ha, which lies close to the Geelders and forms together a nature reserve. South of Sint-Oedenrode lies an ancient agrarian and poplar landscape.

In the north lies park Kienehoef. With a playground, a petting zoo and two ponds.

=== List of nature areas in Sint-Oedenrode ===
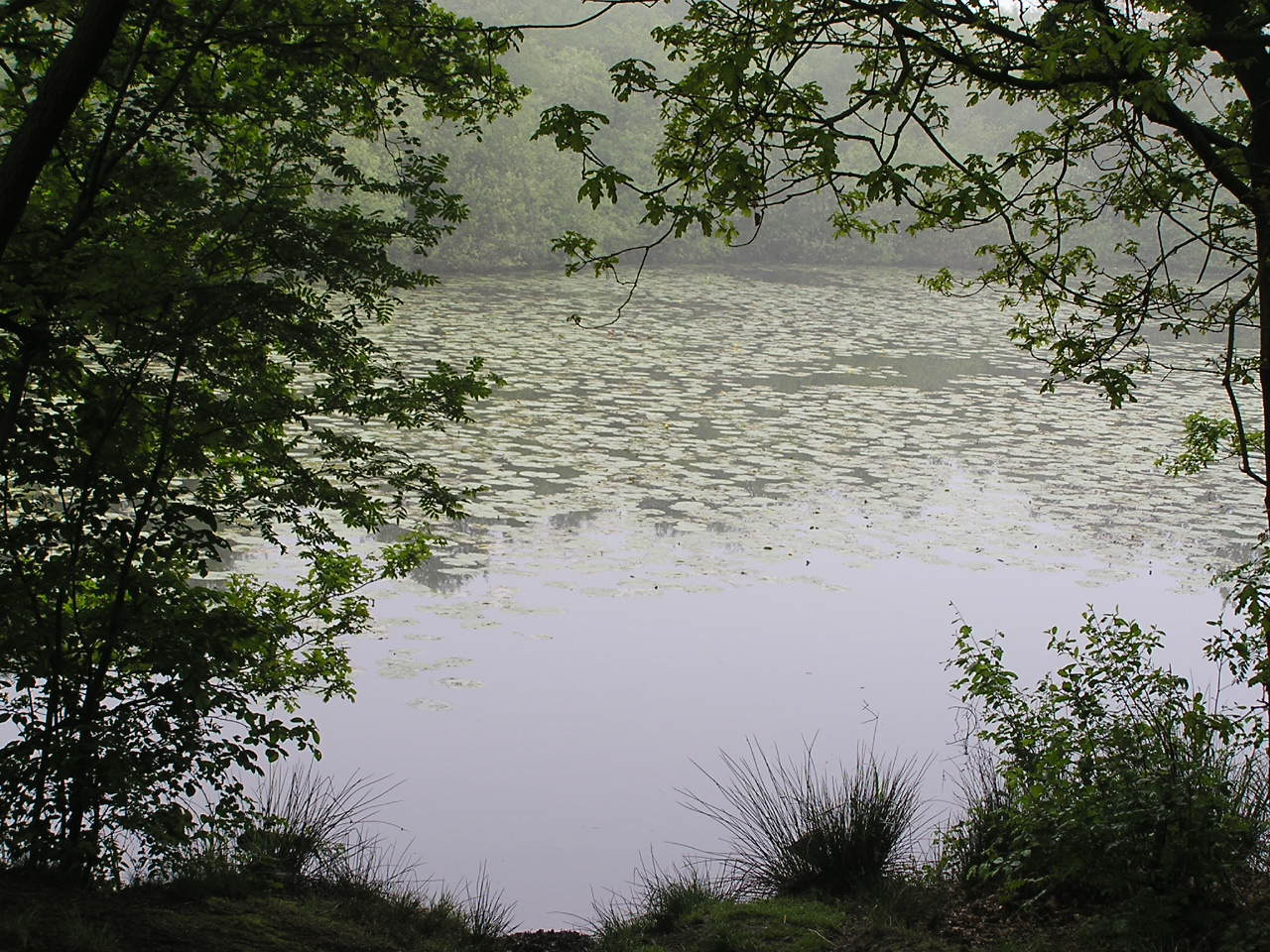
De Moerkuilen

- Het Groene Woud
- The Dommelbeemden
- The Moerkuilen
- The Vresselse Bossen
- De Rooise Broek and De Scheeken
- The Geelders

== Municipal council ==
The municipal council of Sint-Oedenrode consists out of 17 seats. Below is the formation of the council since 1998:

Council seats
Party	1998	2002	2006	2010	2014
CDA	5	5	4	3	4
VVD	2	2	3	4	4
Democratische Groepering Sint-Oedenrode	2	3	2	3	-
Hart voor Rooi	4	3	4	3	4
B.V.T. Rooi	-	-	2	2	-
D.G.S - B.V.T Rooi	-	-	-	-	4
EBK	?	?	?	1	-
Peter Verkuijlen	?	?	?	1	-
Roois Burger Belang	1	2	-	-	1
Ouderen	3	2	2	-	-
Totals	17	17	17	17	17

In 2014, Democratische Groepering Sint-Oedenrode and B.V.T. Rooi joined as one political party "DGS-BVT Rooi".

== Notable buildings ==
- Neo-Gothic Sint Martinus Kerk (Saint Martin Church) from 1915. This is on the site of the old Oda Church. This was a Romanesque style basilica from the 11th century. It stood near the castle of Rode. In 1494 this church was expanded with a Gothic choir with a continuous light-colored horizontal strip of tuff stone, between the normal layer of bricks. It was a chapter church where nine secular canons lived. The chapter existed until 1648. In 1801 the tower collapsed, and the church was demolished to be replaced by a new building, the Saint Martin's church, which was consecrated in 1808. In 1807 the new church was built on the foundations of the original church. In 1915 the new church was replaced by the present church, which was designed by W.Th. Aalst. It has been restored from 1995 - 1997. The choir from 1498 is still intact and is a national monument. The church is the presumed to be the tomb of Hildeware, Countess of Rode, from 1507. This was the foundress of the first church. There are some Baroque paintings and a font in the interior from the 12th century. There is also an organ of 1839, produced by Frans Smits. This was restored in 2001.
- Martinus Cemetery from 1854. The Oda chapel is set on the famous "Odabergje", in the legend the place where the Holy Oda of Brabant settled in the early Middle Ages.
- The Knoptoren. The old Eerschot church served since 1648 as a Protestant church. In 1800 the tower, dating from around 1400, lost its steeple. In the past the tombs of the Lords of the castle De Laar were located in this church.
- The Sint Paulusgasthuis (St. Paul's Hospice) dates from 1434. The plaque, which indicates the wrong year 1546, was only applied in 1926. The characteristic white houses were inhabited until 1972 by poor single women of good character. Also the museum for Brabantic hats and poffers is located in the small house.
- Henkenshage. A former fortified farmhouse, which was known in the 14th century as Strijpe or Streepe. This was bought in 1850 by Peter Jacob Girard de Mielet van Coehoorn and was given its present form as a country stay. In fact, the building is therefore not a real castle, but a country house. During WWII it was used as a distribution centre and during the liberation of Holland (Operation Market Garden) in 1944 it was the headquarters of the US 101st Airborne Division. It is now known as Kasteel Henkenshage and is a Wedding and Function Centre.
- Castle Dommelrode is a former castle, which was built in 1605 by the sheriff of the Peelland quarter. It has long been a monastery, but today it serves as the municipal hall of Sint-Oedenrode.
- De Grote Laar is a farmstead that exist since 1360. The well belonged to the castle De Laar, which has long since disappeared.
- De Markt is a tapered, more or less square market area with a bandstand, which is partly surrounded by stately mansions, including:
  - Het Oude Raadhuis (The Old Town Hall), built in 1863 as a mansion for J.G. Raup and bought in 1881 by the municipality, after the old town hall from 1691, which was at the center of the market square, was demolished. There was a balcony and a tower built, but it was abandoned in 1963 as the town council moved to Castle Dommelrode. At the back of the house is a coach house including a 14th-century cellar, from the former house "Ten Kelre". In the sidewall there are a number of plaques, including those of the 2nd Regiment Hussars that was stationed in Sint-Oedenrode because of the mobilization during World War I, including a number of Horse Doctors of the 1st and 2nd class. In 1939 this regiment was again stationed in the town. There is also a memorial of the 101st Airborne Division, made in 1985.
- The Giant Clog, located in the Dommel park on the Corridor, is a reminder that Sint-Oedenrode was the centre of the clompen industry. This Clog was originally made of wood but due to vandalism has been remade in concrete.
- Coöperatieve Zuivelfabriek Sint-Oda is a building by Louis Kooken from 1916 and was a butter factory with steam engine, which has been in use till 1979. The chimney is a municipal monument.
- De Gouden Leeuw (The Golden Lion). Inn dating back to at least 1876.

== Musea ==
Sint-Oedenrode has several museums and castles:

- Museum H.J. van de Kamp shows an old forge interior dating back to 1905.
- Museum Sint-Paulusgasthuis or Poffer- en mutsenmuseum located in the former Sint-Paulus hospice. Shows a herbal garden and a collection of Brabantian poffers and headdresses.
- Museum Kasteel Henkeshage shows artefacts related to the local nobility.
- Museum Kasteel Dommelrode exhibits archeological findings which are excavated in the Sint-Oedenrode area, mostly near the Hazenputten and the Everse Akkers.
- Jukeboxenmuseum Christ Boelens, a private museum showing jukeboxes.

== Trivia ==
- Though the town is called Sint-Oedenrode, it is generally called "Rooi" by the local population, while the municipality as a whole is referred to as Sint-Oedenrode.
- During the yearly carnaval, the name of the town is changed into "Papgat" for three days. Sint-Oedenrode has 23 carnaval associations.
- Each November the arrival of Sinterklaas in the town is celebrated by a parade for the town's children by the characters involving the holiday.
- The spoken language is North Meierijs (an East Brabantian dialect, which is very similar to colloquial Dutch).

== Awards ==
Sint-Oedenrode was awarded the prestigious award Entente Florale of the greenest village of Europe in 2000.

== Born in Sint-Oedenrode ==
- Els Coppens-van de Rijt, painter and writer
- Nikki Kerkhof, singer (Winner of Dutch Idols 4)
- Lou Tellegen, actor
- Ruud van der Rijt, football player (Willem II)
- Willem van Genugten, jurist

== Gallery ==
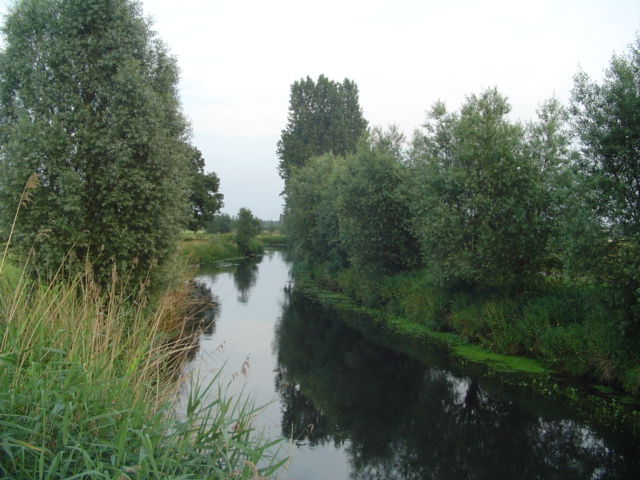
Dommel valley at Sint-Oedenrode

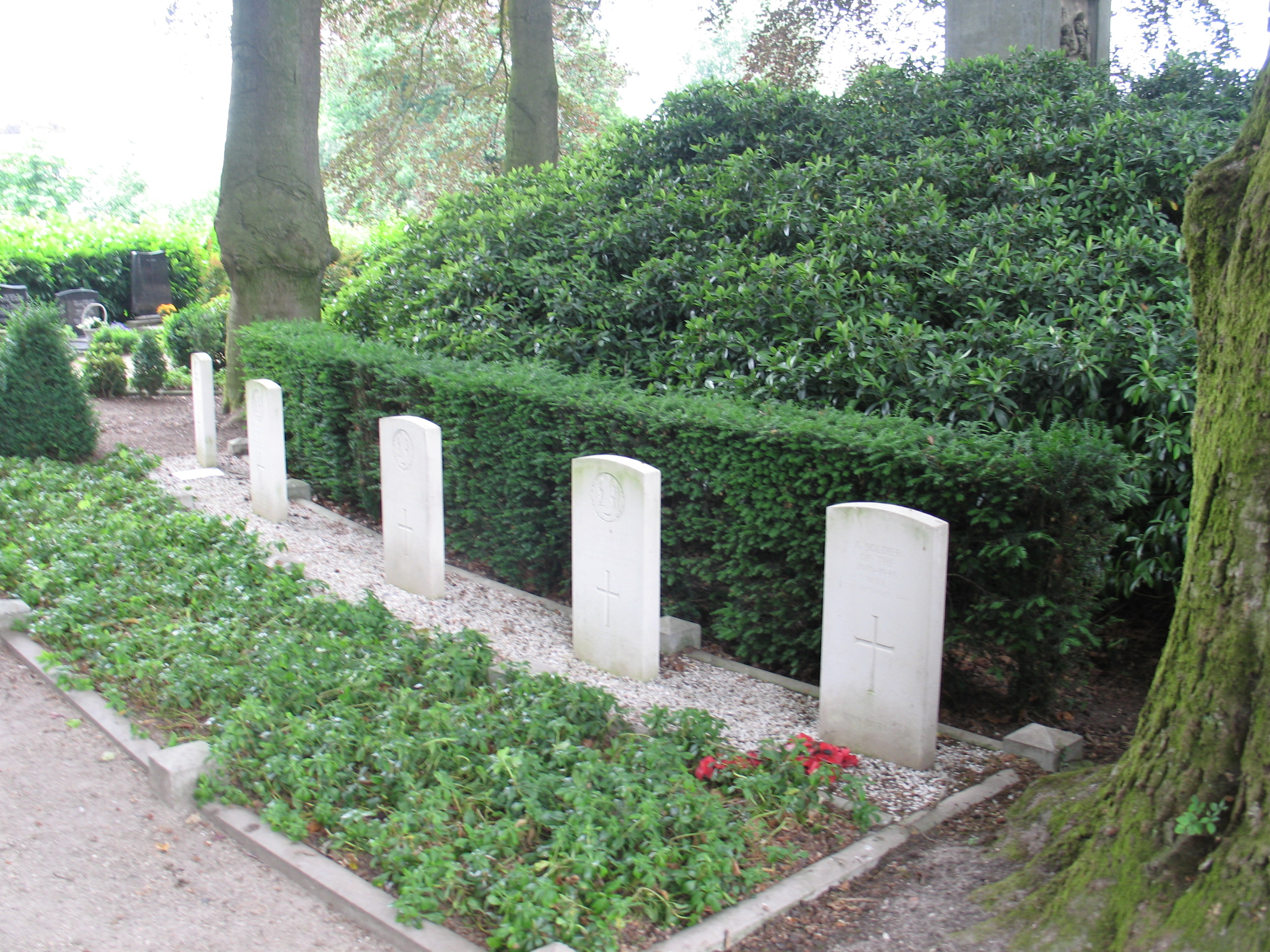
War graves at the cemetery of Sint-Oedenrode

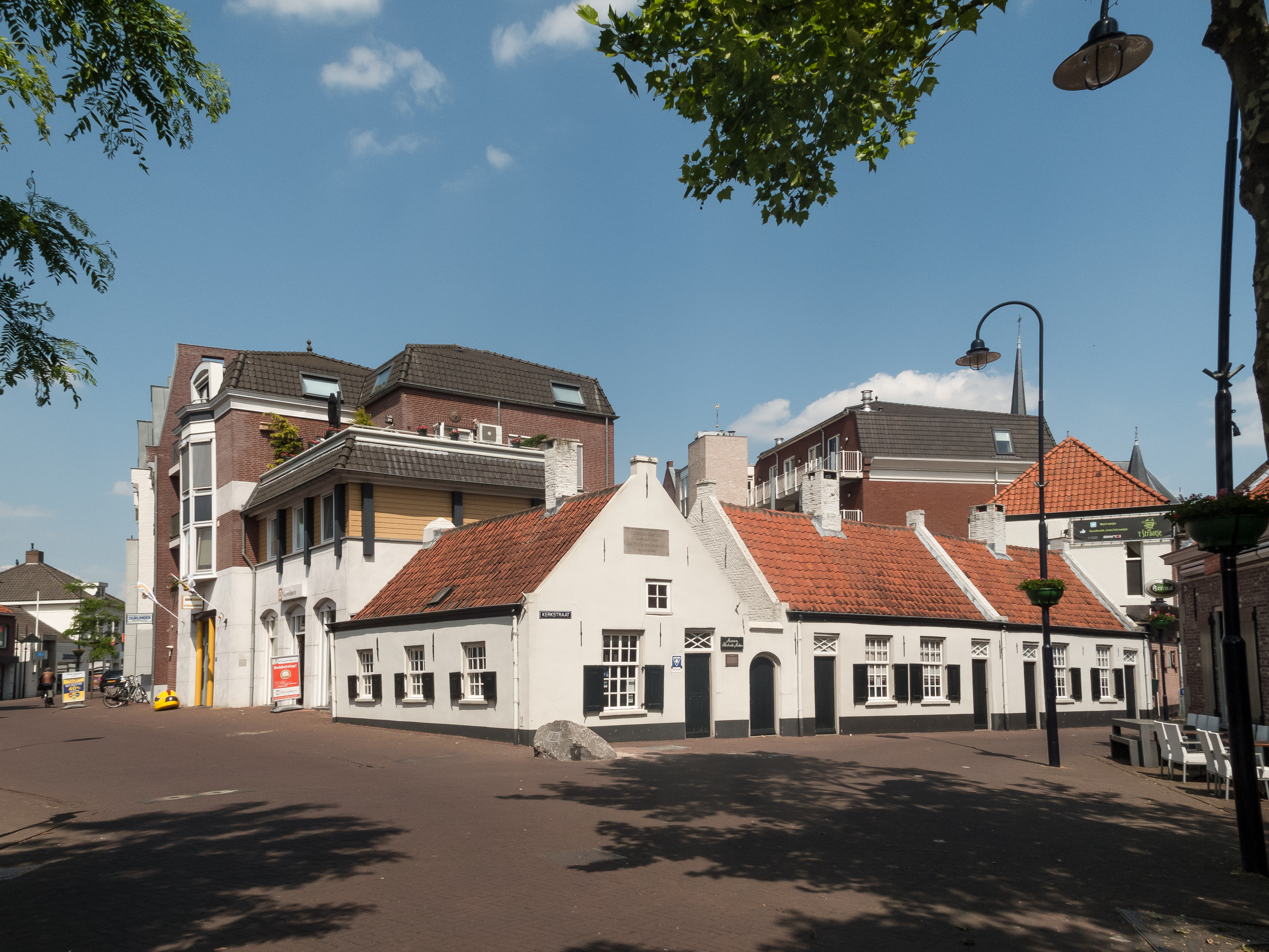
Sint Paulus Hospice, 1434, Sint-Oedenrode

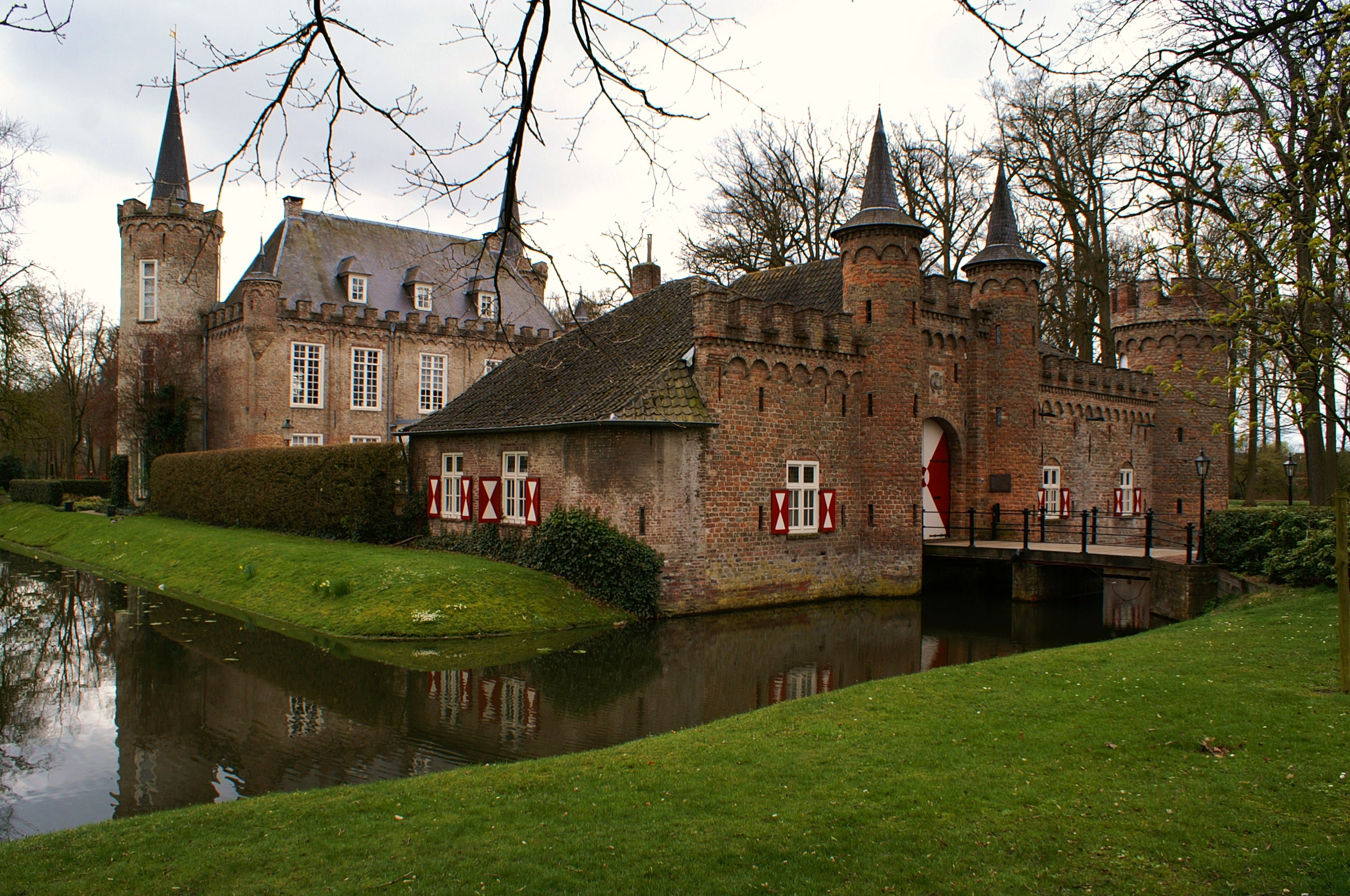
Henkenshage Castle as seen from the front

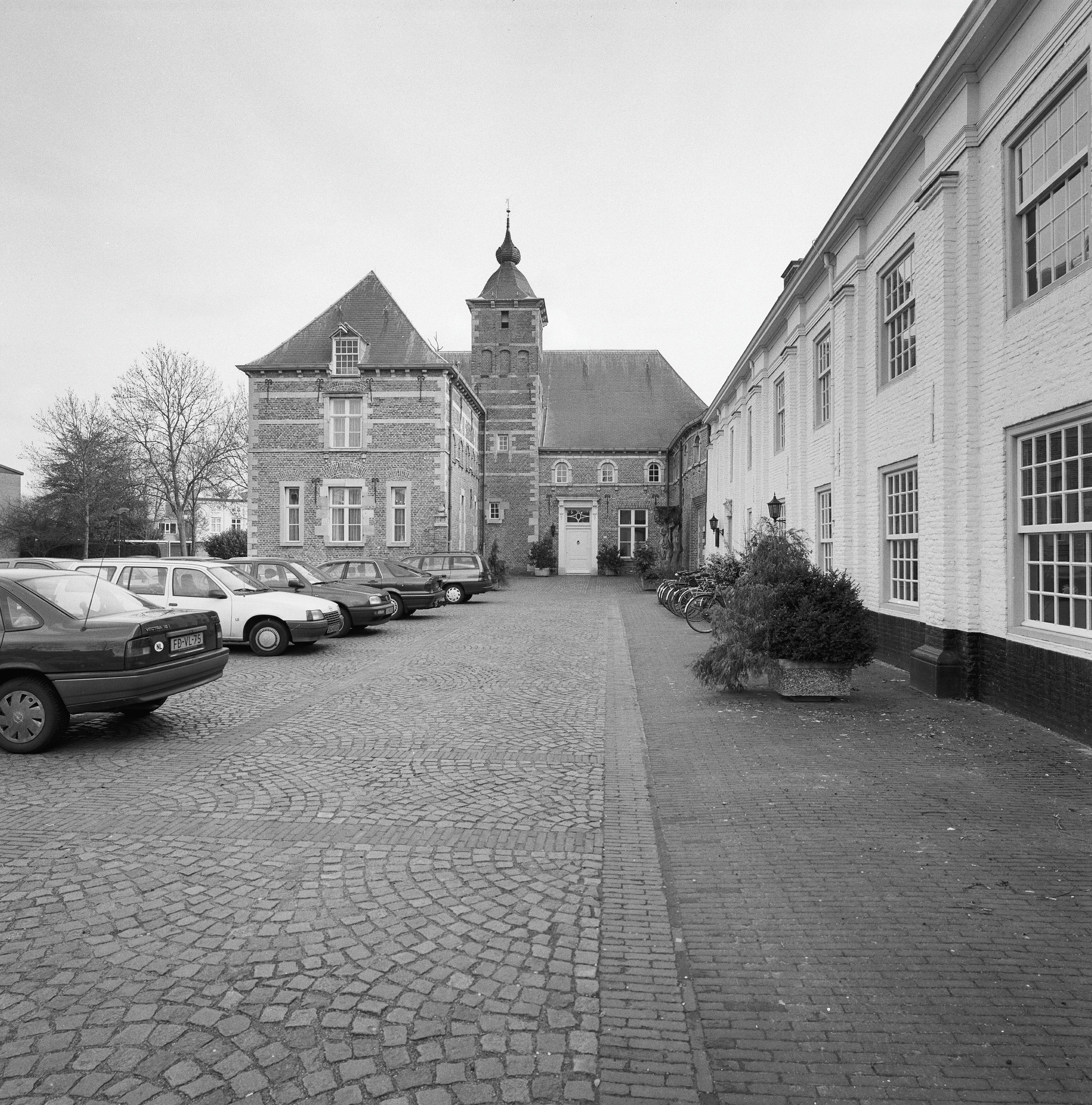
Castle Dommelrode, functioning as town hall of Sint-Oedenrode

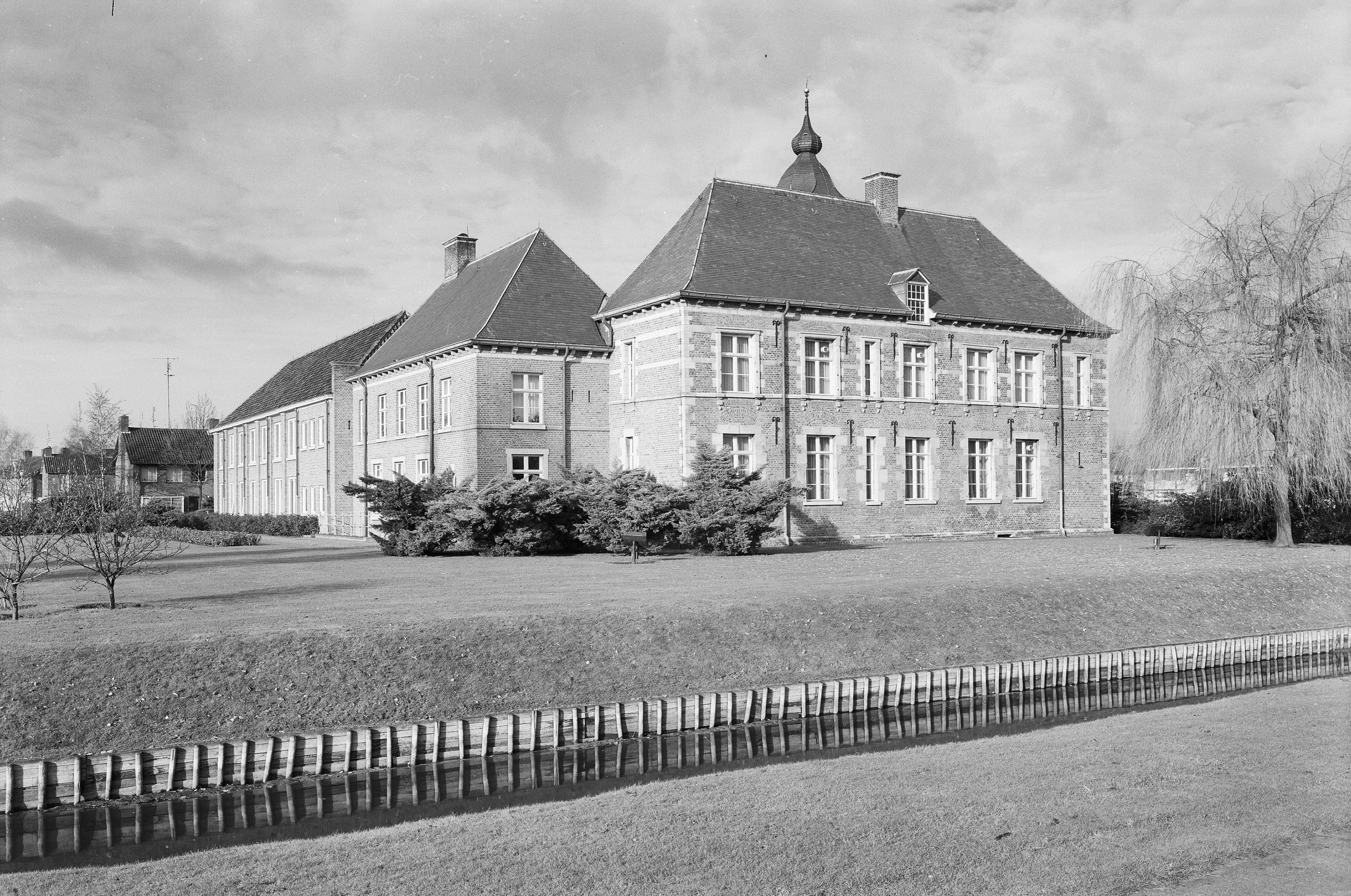
Castle Dommelrode, other side

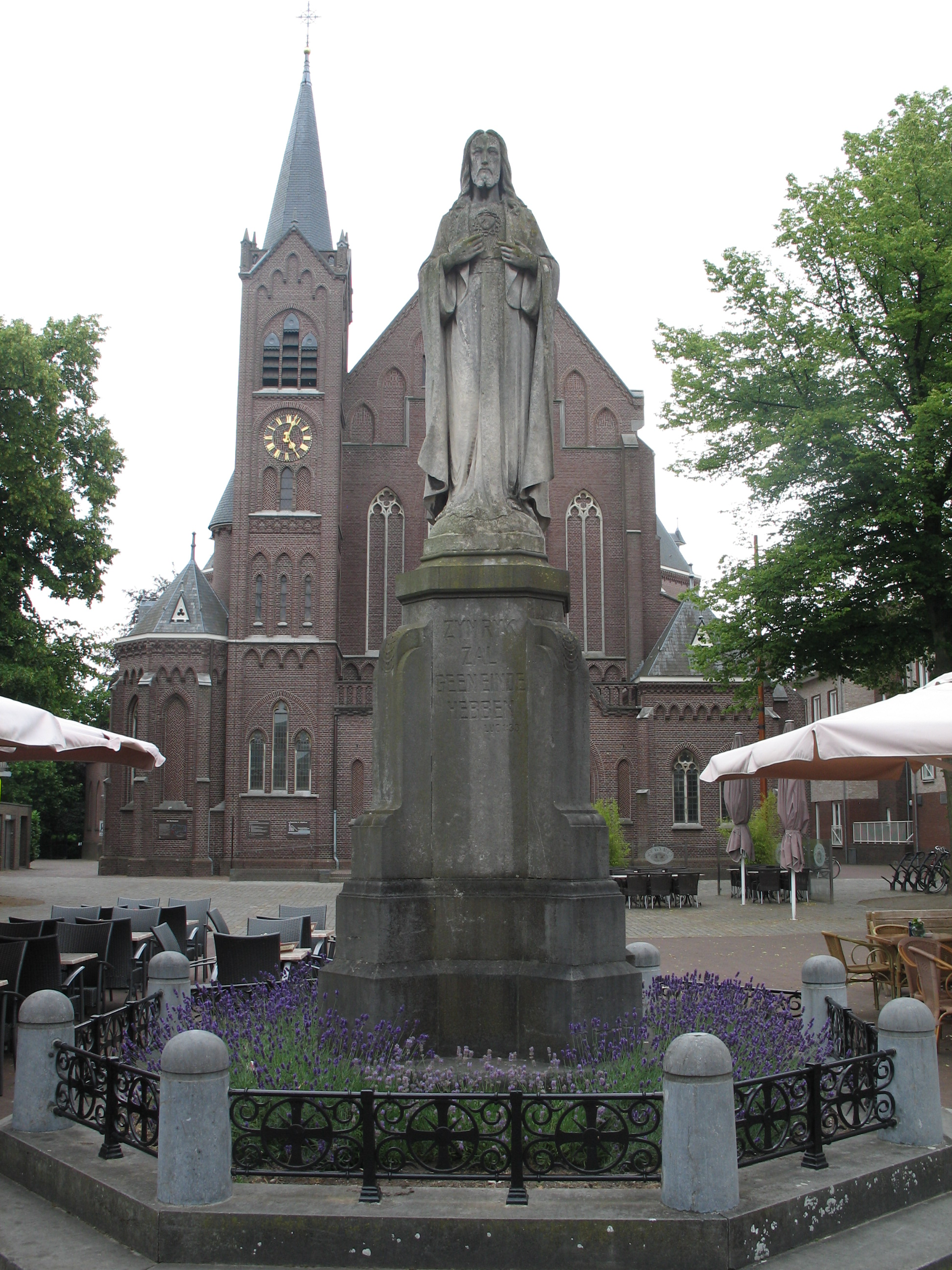
Statue in front of Sint Martinus Church, Sint-Oedenrode

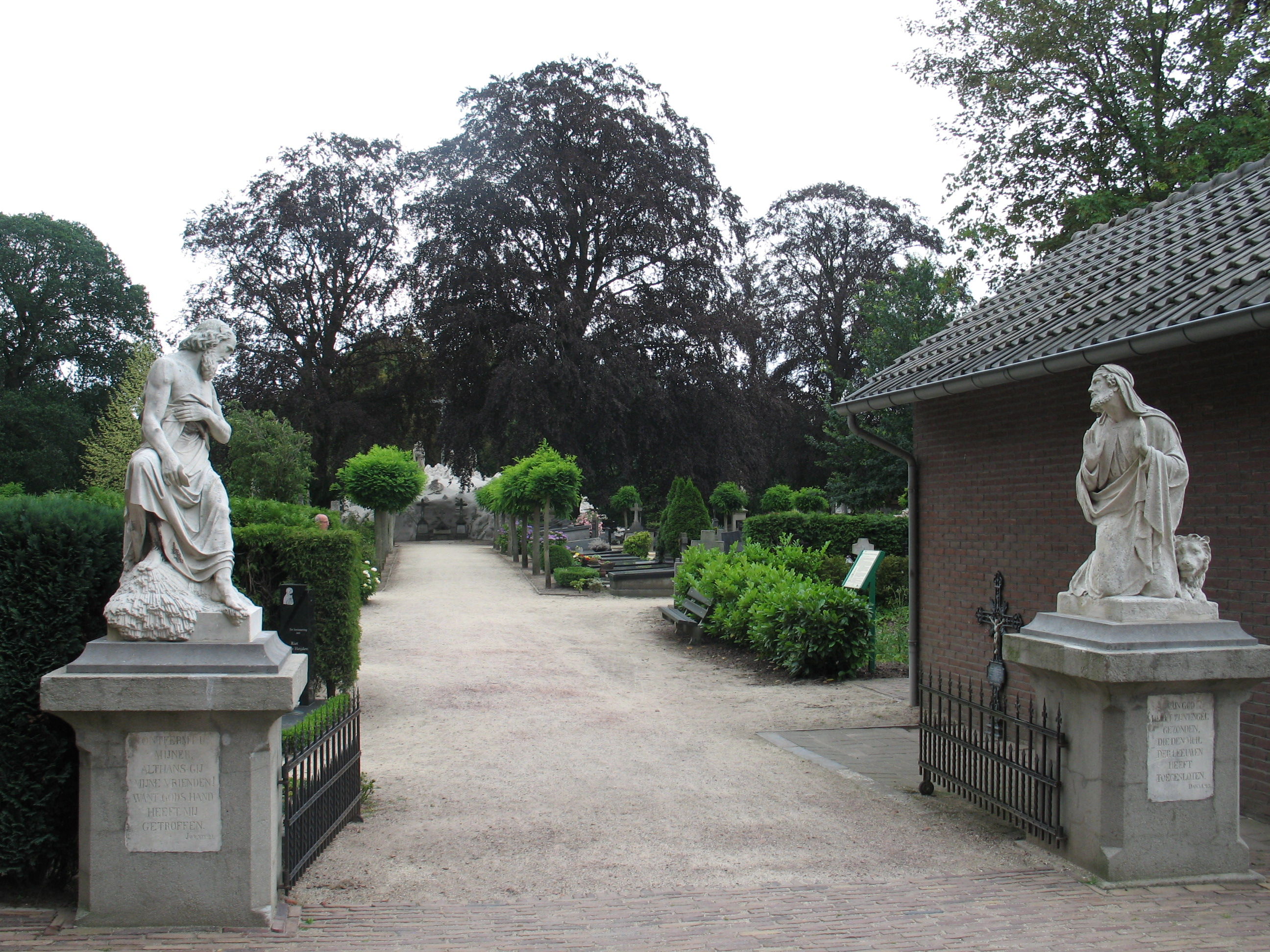
Entrance of cemetery, Sint-Oedenrode
