= Poffer =

Traditional female folk headdress

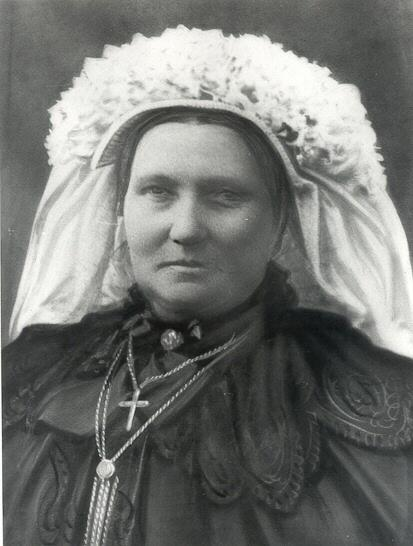
Woman wearing a poffer

The poffer, toer (Limburg dialect) or North Brabantian hat is a traditional female folk headdress of North Brabant, most famous of the Meierij of 's-Hertogenbosch and of northern Limburg, Netherlands. The poffer was worn only by married women. It was fashionable between the 1860s and the 1920s. In contrast to Zeeland and the more northern parts of the Netherlands, in North Brabant and Limburg there was never any distinctive folkloric costume worn by either men or women, making the poffer the only folkloric garment in this part of the Netherlands.

== Etymology and origin ==
The word poffer is derived from poffen, the puffing of sleeves and trousers worn in the mid-19th century. The poffer evolved from a simple headdress, the paske (a strip of fabric decorated with narrow, pleated fabric) which was worn on a white hat. In Limburg the poffer is called a toer. Toer is a term derived from the French word, touronette. Touronette is akin to feminine finery but was originally a braid with ribbons and flowers. The poffer is not to be confused with the poffer-pan, used to make poffertjes.

== Social history ==
Prior to 1900, the Brabant area was not prosperous due to poor sandy soil. With the introduction of fertilizer around 1860, the region's economy improved. This new wealth was reflected by an increase in the size of the poffer, which was at its largest size between about 1915 and 1920.

The poffer was worn by those who could afford one: the wives of middle-class men, richer farmers, officials and professionals, such as a mayor or doctor. The size and elegance of a woman's poffer reflected her husband's wealth. Men aspired to see their wives noticed in an elaborate poffer. Sometimes, the poffer was mockingly called a "meringue".

In the first half of the 20th century, the poffer fell out of favour, largely because of its impracticality, especially when riding a bicycle. There was also a lack of fabric in the area during the second world war period. The wearing of the poffer continued until the 1950s but only on special occasions such as weddings, holidays and attending church during which it was replaced by more modern style hats.

== Appearance ==
The poffer was a white tulle hat with a lace trim. It was decorated with pearls and white, gold, silver or glass beads called dew drops. It was also adorned with artificial flowers (or artificial fruit in case of older women) and four ribbons (lavaliers) of about 12 cm wide and 60 cm long which hung over the shoulders and the back. The breadth and quality of the ribbons indicated the wealth of the wearer. The details of the poffer varied from one area to another.

The poffer was decorated with artificial flowers or fruits in pastel shades or brighter colors depending on the town's tradition. One could recognize the hometown of the wearer by its appearance and the age of the wearer by the decoration on the poffer. Flowers were for brides and younger married women. Older women decorated their poffer with silk apples, pears and buds.

== Regional variations ==
The poffer varied regionally in size, shape, colour and decoration. Women preferred the type of poffer from their home town. Even if a woman lived in another village afters married, she usually would still order her poffer from the poffer maker in her home village or town.

The poffer had many different local names including: klein mutsje (little hat); koveltje (from little cowl or dormeuse); kempische muts (Campinian hat); kindermuts (children's hat); cornetmuts (from cornette hat); Eindhovense mutsje (Eindhovenian hat); drie-toerkes muts (three-touronettes hat); and, daagse muts (daily hat).

The type of head garment was found in North Brabant, Limburg from Mook to Roermond and across the German border to just past Xanten. To the north, poffers were worn in southern Gelderland, for example, in Nijmegen and Bommelerwaard.

The biggest poffer was worn in the Meierij, where it was worn towards the front of the head. To the east of Brabant and Limburg the poffer would be placed further back on the head. In eastern North Brabant, the poffer followed the shape of the head, like an arc. In western North Brabant, a pleated poffer was worn.

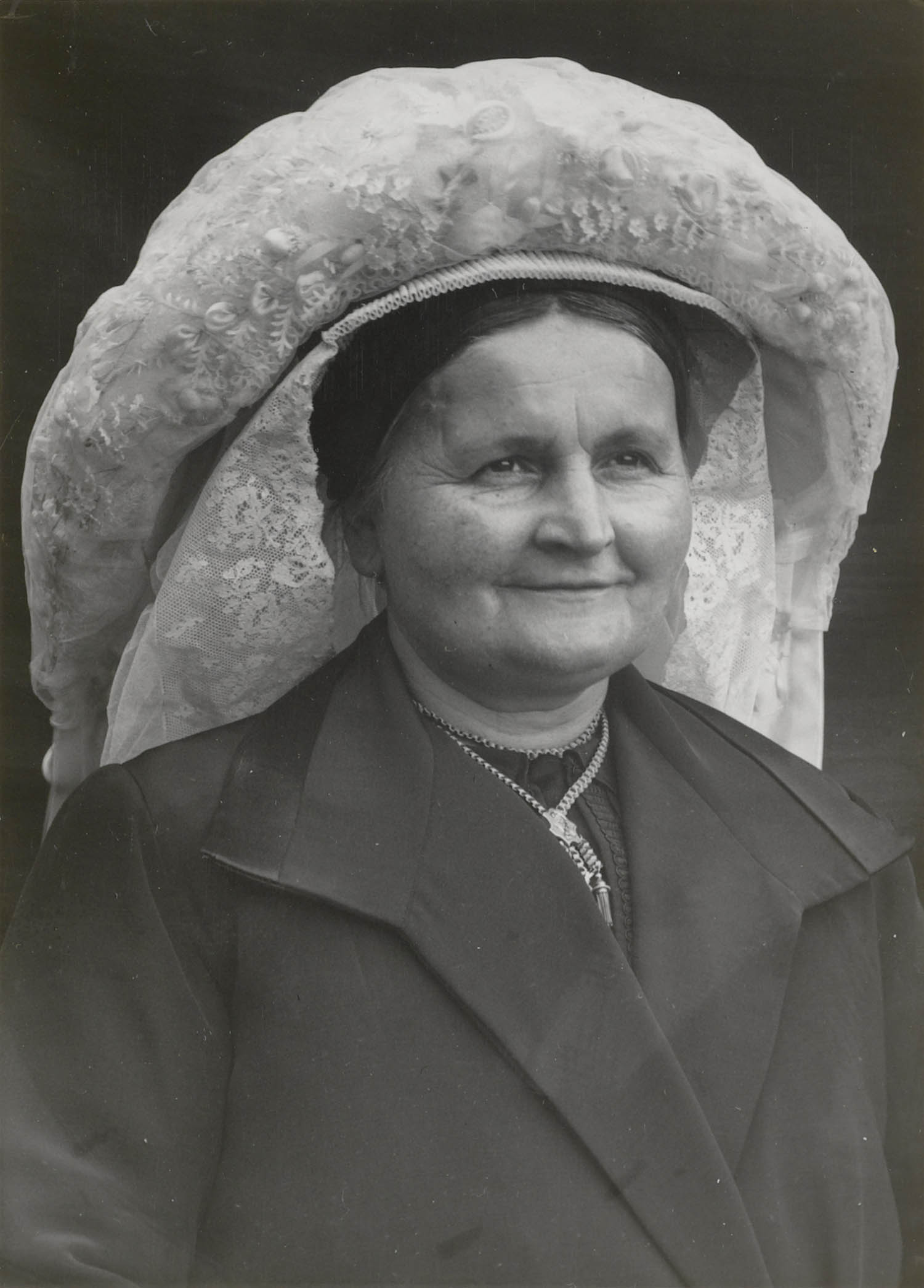
Poffer or Brabantian Headdress, worn by woman in Beek (Beek en Donk), North Brabant, the Netherlands, 1931-05-18

== Wearing the poffer ==
First, a black cap was worn to smooth the form and strengthen the shape of the head. This hat was worn at home when the woman was around an open fire. Next, a lace, tulle or gauze hat was worn. Then, the poffer was worn as an over-bonnet, either pinned to the hat at the front and or tied beneath the chin. To keep the soft fabric of the poffer in shape, starch with borax and white wax was used. The hat and poffer were detached for cleaning and washed in soft soap and then laid, still wet, on the grass to be bleached by the sun. Starch was used to keep the fabric from yellowing.

== Occasion ==
Poffers for babies and young children were not made. Until a girl was 10 years of age she'd wear a tight woolen cap. Even so, a baby or young girl's bonnet could be decorated with gauze flowers and had ribbons for securing.

Unmarried women did not wear a poffer. However, they did wear a black bonnet called a capotehoedje or kaphoedje. These were headdresses of a single black piece of fabric, adorned with two or four black ribbons and black artificial flowers. In Veghel they were known to also have little black glass bells that would ring if they walked. These black bonnets were worn after a girl's first holy communion at about the age of twelve.

=== Mourning poffer ===
Traditionally, in the Netherlands, those in mourning wore dark clothes. In North Brabant and northern Limburg the shade of the day to day dress was also dark or black (also for weddings and other celebrations clothing was entirely black). Women in those areas therefore indicated their mourning state by wearing a special type of poffer: there would be no lace trim and no beads and few flowers. In a few villages in the Peel the mourning poffer could be all black or it was black and white, but these non-white poffers are rare exceptions. Generally a mourning poffer would be entirely white but without any or with only flower decorations. If the deceased was a more distant relative, an all white "half" mourning poffer with all white flower decorations but without beads and never with lace was worn.

== Poffer makers ==
Once, each village had a poffer maker with their own distinct tradition, and the poffer maker would in detail consult the client how the design would look like and which fabrics would be used. A poffer took approximately sixty hours to make. Poffer makers were divided into three grades. In the lowest grade were women who cleaned, repaired and washed the poffers. The middle grade consisted of those who made new poffers. The upper ten designed the poffers and made high end articles. Poffer makers were often unmarried ladies with a physical impairment.

For washing, starching, ironing and reassembling a poffer, a poffer maker received 9 cents. The price of an ordinary poffer was 35 guilders. A mourning poffer cost 15 guilders. A chic poffer with handmade lace and a new under hat cost approximately 100 guilders. The price depended on the amount of lace and the number of floral motifs. A special poffer could cost as much as 500 guilders. Usually, a farmer's wife had two or three poffers.

== Conservation ==
Dutch ethnological museums have a number of poffers in their collections, and some North Brabantian museums have special collections, for example, the Museum van Brabantse mutsen en poffers in Sint-Oedenrode. Poffers are worn during folkloric celebrations, especially at the boerenbruiloft (peasant wedding) during the carnaval. In 1996, on the occasion of the 200th anniversary of the province of North Brabant, a commemorative coin was issued which was called the poffer. It depicted a woman wearing a poffer. This coin was legal tender until 10 January 1997.

== In art ==
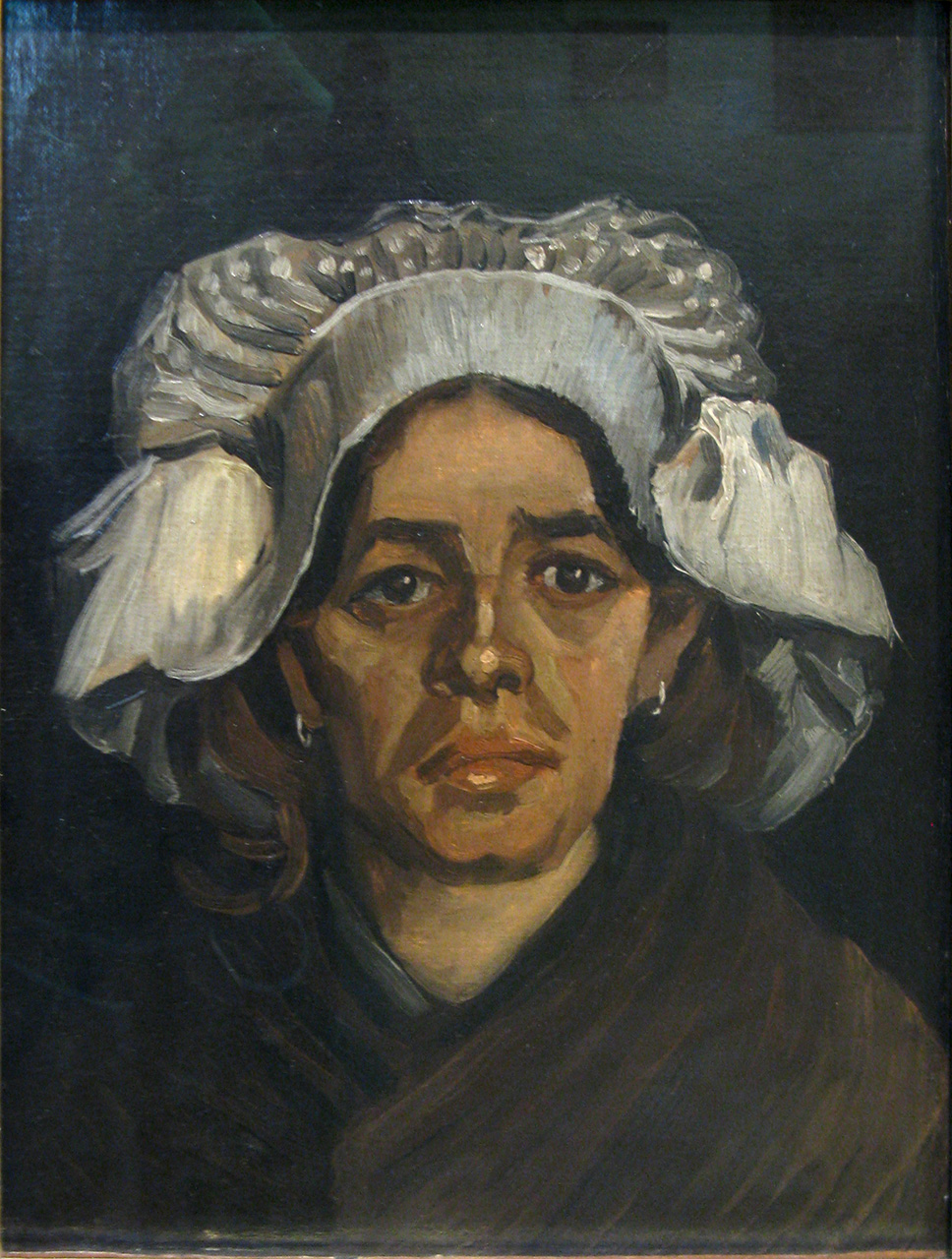
Woman's portrait, by Vincent van Gogh, 1885

The best known visual art representation of the poffer is likely the 1885 portrait of a woman by Vincent van Gogh, held in the Norton Simon Museum of Art, Pasadena, California. Vincent van Gogh made several woman portraits with poffers during his Nuenen period.
