= Christiaan Bangeman Huygens =

Dutch nobleman and diplomat

Coat of arms Bangeman Huygens family

Jhr. Christaan Diederik Emerens Johan Bangeman Huygens (31 October 1772 in Sint-Oedenrode – 24 March 1857 in Maastricht) was a Dutch diplomat and civil servant, from 1825 to 1832 Minister Plenipotentiary of the Kingdom of the Netherlands in Washington, DC.

== Career ==
Bangeman Huygens was the son of Willem Vincent Bangeman, a merchant in the Dutch East India Company, and Catharina Constantia Huygens (whose surname he in 1781 added to that of his father).

He became a partisan of the Patriot faction, but was nevertheless sent out in 1793 with the last envoy of the Dutch Republic to Denmark, Jacob Fagel as his secretary. After Fagel's dismissal as a result of the Batavian Revolution in 1795, he stayed on as chargé d'affaires. He acted as Minister Plenipotentiary of the Batavian Republic (after his formal appointment in 1796) and subsequently the Kingdom of Holland, at the court of the Kingdom of Denmark till 1807. (In 1795 he was involved in the diplomatic aftermath of the engagement between Royal Navy and Batavian frigates known as the action of 22 August 1795).

In 1807 he was appointed a member of the Staatsraad (Council of State) of the Kingdom of Holland, which he remained till 1809.

In 1808 he was appointed Minister Plenipotentiary of the Kingdom of Holland to the Kingdom of Westphalia which he remained till 1809. At the same time he was the King's commissioner in Ost-Friesland, which at the time had been annexed by the Kingdom of Holland, and remained a Staatsraad.

After the annexation of the Kingdom of Holland by the French Empire in 1810 he was appointed requestmeester-generaal (a Napoleonic functionary in the government of the Dutch polders), which he remained till the restoration of Dutch independence in 1813.

In 1815 he was again appointed Minister Pleninpotentiary, now of the new United Kingdom of the Netherlands, to the Hanseatic Cities in Hamburg, which he remained till 1825.

In 1825 he became Minister Plenipotentiary of the Kingdom of the Netherlands to the United States, which he remained till July, 1832 (i.e. during the Administration of John Quincy Adams and the first Administration of Andrew Jackson). In 1831 he was instrumental in the retrieval of part of the jewelry collection of the Princess of Orange, future Queen Consort of the Netherlands, that had been stolen in 1829 in Brussels by a certain Constant Polari, and had been transported to the U.S.

In 1832 he again went to Copenhagen, where he had started his diplomatic career, as Minister Plenipotentiary to the Danish Court, and remained there till 1842.

He was a Commander in the Order of the Union, the Order of the Reunion, and the Order of the Netherlands Lion.

== Family life ==
Bangeman Huygens first married Elise Marguerite Josèphe Sophie Constance Marie Lauri, countess of Danneskiold Löwendal, in Paris in 1802. After her death in 1812 he married Constantia Wilhelmina Vrijthoff in Maastricht in 1815. He had six children from these marriages.

In 1818 he bought Henkenshage mansion in his birthplace Sint-Oedenrode, where he lived for a while, until it went to his only son, Rutger Bangeman Huygens van Löwendal in 1843.

In 1832 he was inducted into the Dutch nobility with the title of Jonkheer.
