= Henkenshage =

Manor house in the Netherlands

Coordinates: 51.559°N 5.456°E

Henkenshage is a notable building located in the municipality of Meierijstad in the Netherlands. It is a former fortified farmhouse, known in the 14th century as a Strijpe or Streepe. The building, often mistaken for a castle, is not a real castle but rather a manor house.

In 1818, Henkenshage was bought by Dutch diplomat and civil servant Christaan Diederik Emerens Johan Bangeman Huygens, who was Minister Plenipotentiary of the Kingdom of the Netherlands in Washington, D.C. from 1825 to 1832. Born in Sint-Oedenrode, he lived at the mansion for a period and, in 1843, it went to his only son, Rutger Bangeman Huygens van Löwendal.

The property was bought in 1850 by Peter Jacob Girard de Mielet van Coehoorn and was given its present form as a country stay.

During World War II, Henkenshage was used as a distribution centre, and during the liberation of Holland (Operation Market Garden) in 1944, it was the headquarters of the US 101st Airborne Division.

It is now known as Kasteel Henkenshage and is a Wedding and Function Centre.

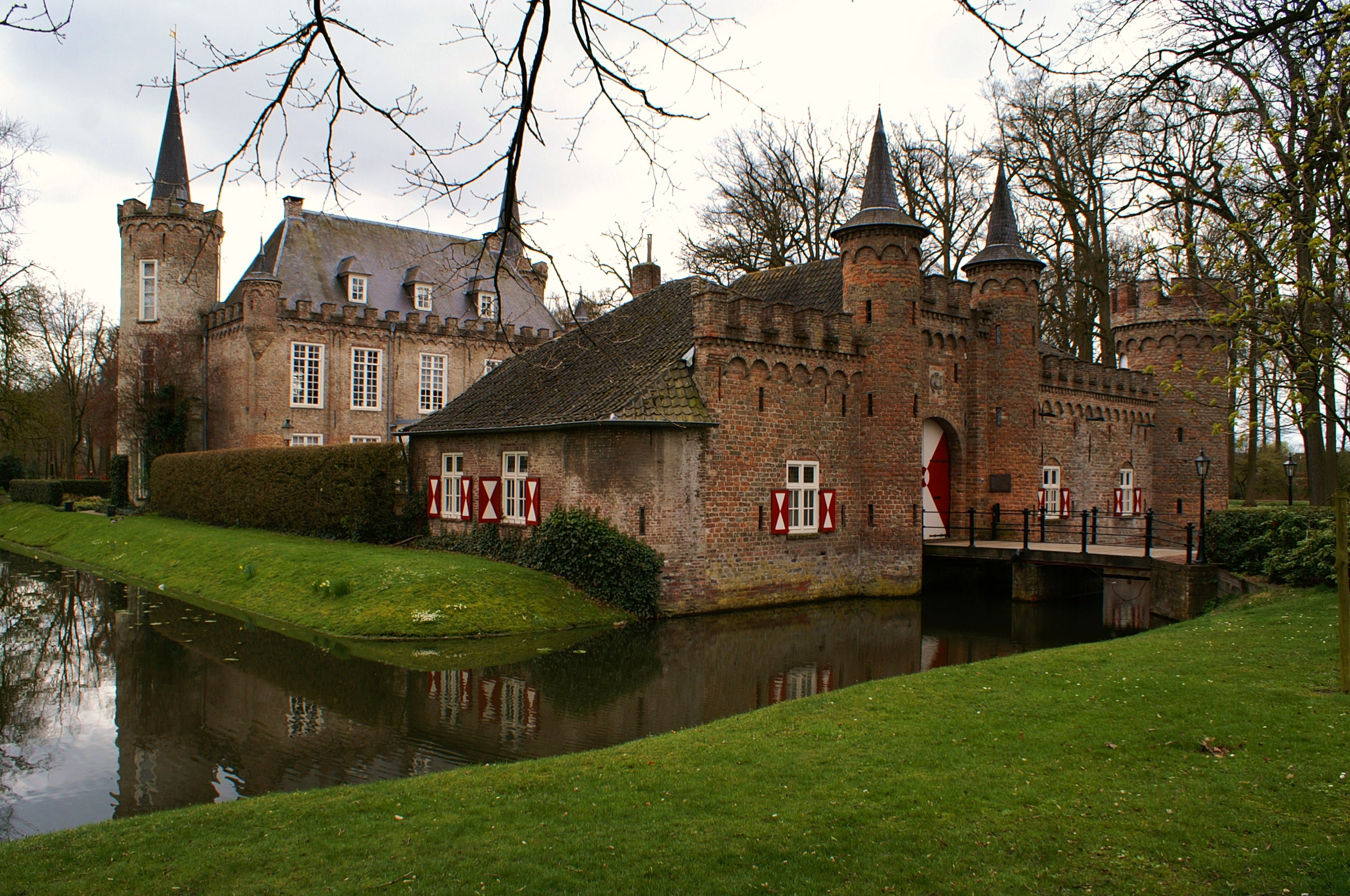
Henkenshage Castle
