= Het Rooise Broek and De Scheeken =

Het Rooise Broek and De Scheeken are nature areas that border the outskirts of the village of Boskant, Meierijstad, North Brabant. Both het Rooise Broek and de Scheeken are part of the larger area Het Groene Woud.

The area around Boskant - het Rooise Broek - is characterized by the many small, often irregularly shaped, parcels along which there are often poplars planted. Poplars used to provide wood for the clog industry. So called donks (a shallow hills in a further flat landscape) can be seen in this area, these are the higher parts in this park-like landscape and are still recognizable in street names like Donderdonk and Goeiendonk.

On the northwest side of Boskant is the municipal border forest and nature reserve De Scheeken, consisting of poplar forests interspersed with spruce, oak, beech and pastures.

"Het Brabantse Landschap" uses cattle and horses for extensive grazing. As part of Het Groene Woud, there is a wildlife crossing across the A2 between de Scheeken and further west located forest and nature of Velder and Mortelen which serves as an important link for the animals to cross between the different areas.

In het Rooise Broek and de Scheeken are several hiking trails, and in the area there are some artfully carved figures in dead trees made by the Boskantse tree artist Theo Sonnemans.
