= Velder =

Velder is a surname. Notable people with the surname include:

- Anthony Velder (born 1992), Dutch footballer
- Eli Velder (1925–2020), American academic
- Han Velder, Dutch footballer
- Maurice De Velder (born 1958), Dutch entrepreneur
- Nygel Velder (born 1992), Dutch footballer
- Susan Velder (born 1939), Canadian sculptor and painter
