= Marggraff =

Marggraff is a surname. Notable people with the surname include:

- Ewald Marggraff (1923–2003), Dutch landowner
- Felix Marggraff (born 1970), German TV director
- Hermann Marggraff (1809–1864), German poet and humorous author
- Jim Marggraff (born 1958), American entrepreneur
- Wilma Marggraff, American politician
