= East Brabantian =

East Brabantian (Dutch: Oost-Noord-Brabants or Oost-Brabants) is one of the main divisions of the Brabantian dialect group recognized by the Woordenboek van de Brabantse dialecten. East Brabantian dialects are mainly spoken in the eastern part of the province of North Brabant. Classifications of Brabantian recognize it as a separate dialect group. Sometimes it is called Meierijs, after the Bailiwick of Den Bosch.

East Brabantian dialects are further subdivided into Kempenlands (in a large area east and south east of Eindhoven, including Arendonk and Lommel in Belgium), Noord-Meierijs (in an area south of 's-Hertogenbosch into Eindhoven), Peellands (in Helmond and surroundings), Geldrops and Heeze-and-Leendes. The last two are small local dialects that are found as separate groups in few other classifications.

== Characteristics ==
East Brabantian dialects are distinct from the more western variants, Central Brabantian and West Brabantian, and also from dialects of southern Brabant like Southern Brabantian, Kempens and Getelands. Some peculiarities are typical eastern and shared with the Limburgish dialects while others only occur locally.

East Brabantian dialects have been somewhat influenced by the Cologne language expansion and thus share some features with it which are absent from western varieties. Such differences include umlaut in diminutives and the conjugation of Germanic strong verbs (like in Limburgish). Typical of East Brabantian are forms such as geleuven vs Dutch geloven "believe", bruur vs Dutch broer "brother" and zuke vs Dutch zoeken "search". Also diminutives such as menneke (with i-umlaut of the stem vowel) vs Dutch mannetje "little man" and jeske vs Dutch jasje "little coat". Conjugations such as velt vs Dutch valt "falls" are typically East Brabantian. (Compare Standard German fällt, also showing the effects of the final *i in the reconstructed Common West Germanic protoform *fallidi.)

- East Brabantian dialects feature umlaut in diminutive formation (póp - pupke) and some words which end in -i in their historical West Germanic forms (e.g.: kees vs Dutch kaas "cheese", both representing the reconstructed Proto-West-Germanic form *kāsī).
- The variants wè and dè are used in East Brabantian for what and that. (Western Brabantian uses wa and da, and Limburgish de).
- East Brabantian exhibits a more eastern-tinged vocabulary (e.g. rad vs. wiel "wheel").
- As in most other Brabantian dialects, long ô undergoes fronting (gruun vs. Markiezaats uses only groen "green").
- Typical of the Meierij is the preservation of the sk where standard Dutch has shifted to the sch (skoewn vs. schoen "shoes") and the shortening of many original long vowels (torre vs. toren "tower").
- The diphthongs /ɛi/ and /œy/ are here often turned into monophthongs as [ɛː] and [œː] (èès and hèùs vs. West Brabantian ais and ois).
- Unlike in West Brabantian, h has been preserved in East Brabantian, the most common departing greet being houdoe (meaning "take care") (vs. the West Brabantian oudoe).
- The svarabhakti vocal is almost always pronounced (mellek vs melk "milk").
- As all Brabantian dialects, East Brabantian uses a soft G.
