= Meierij van 's-Hertogenbosch =

Part of the Duchy of Brabant

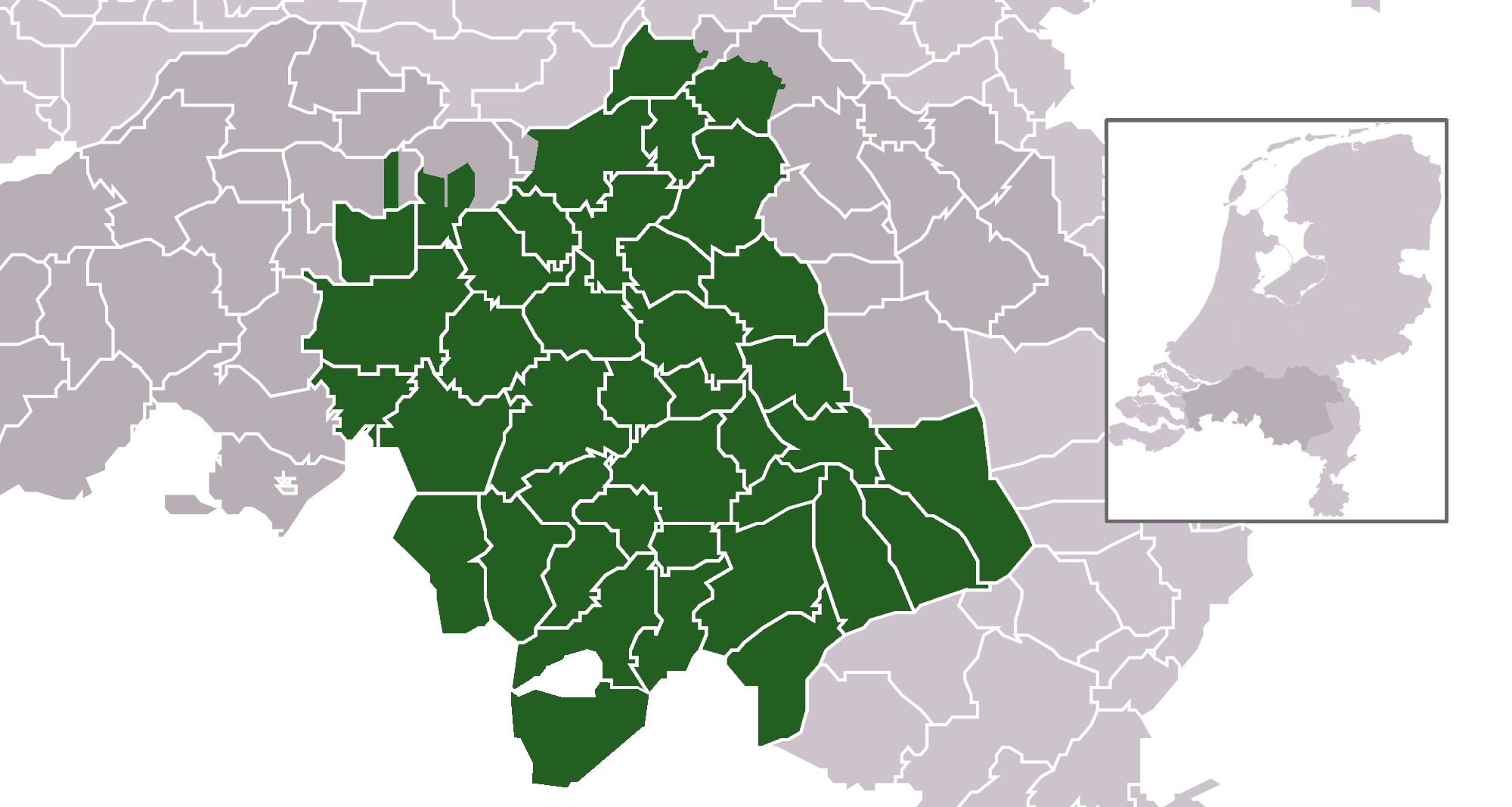
The historical Meierij van 's-Hertogenbosch as part of the Dutch Republic between 1648 and 1795.

The Meierij van 's-Hertogenbosch (Dutch pronunciation: [mɛiəˈrɛi vɑn ˌsɛrtoːɣə(m)ˈbɔs]; Dutch for "Bailiwick of 's-Hertogenbosch") was one of the four parts of the Duchy of Brabant, the others being the Margraviate of Antwerp, the County of Brussels and the County of Leuven/Louvain. Located in the current-day Netherlands, it acquired its name from the bailiff of 's-Hertogenbosch, who administered the area in the name of the Dukes of Brabant. The Meierij roughly corresponds to the larger province of North Brabant.

The capital city of North Brabant and the most important city of the bailiwick is 's-Hertogenbosch (Dutch for 'the Duke's Forest'), also known as Den Bosch ('The Forest') or Bois-le-Duc (French name). Other parts of the bailiwick are the so-called Vier Kwartieren (four quarters):

- Oisterwijk kwartier (with main city Oisterwijk)
- Kempenland kwartier (with main city Oirschot and later Eindhoven)
- Peelland kwartier (with main city Sint Oedenrode)
- Maasland kwartier (with main city Oss)

In the northeast of the bailiwick there were some free lands which were also connected to the Meierij:

- Land of Cuijk
- County of Megen
- Land of Ravenstein
- Barony of Boxmeer
- Territory Gemert (belonging to the Teutonic order)
- Land of Bokhoven

In the south, the nowadays Belgian town of Lommel belonged to the bailiwick, while the village of Luyksgestel belonged to the Prince-bishopric of Liège. In 1807 these areas were exchanged.

== Landscape ==
The Bailiwick of 's-Hertogenbosch consists mainly of the poor sandy grounds of the Peel and Kempen. Those areas, which in old times were not densely populated, consisted of enormous heaths and marshlands, interrupted by woods and fenlands. In the north and east the area is surrounded by the river Maas. Numerous little rivers rise in the high sand areas and find their way to the rivers Aa and Dommel. Both rivers come together in the marshlands around 's-Hertogenbosch where they form the river Dieze that ends up in the Maas.

Since the Middle Ages the waste lands of Peel and Kempen have been cultivated. Only small parts of the once enormous heaths and marshlands have survived until modern times. In the first part of the 19th century the rivers Aa and Dommel were cultivated but nowadays they have gone back to their old run for the purpose of nature development. Legal re-division of land forms a major threat for the cultural and historical aspects of landscape at the moment.

== History ==
Duchy of Brabant c. 1350

Historically the Meierij is the descendant of Taxandria, when that area comes under the rule of the dukes of Brabant in the 12th century. To protect the area from the counts of Gelre, the dukes founded a new ring of cities. Hendrik I of Brabant granted city rights to 's-Hertogenbosch (c. 1185), Oisterwijk (1213 or 1230), Sint-Oedenrode (1232) and Eindhoven (1232). However, despite these foundings, the Meierij often suffered from conflicts and wars between Brabant and Gelre.

The bailiwick was prosperous in the 15th and first part of the 16th century. In these times many new monumental buildings were built (like the famous gothic style St. Jan's Cathedral of 's-Hertogenbosch), the activities of well-known painter Hieronymus Bosch (also called Jeroen Bosch) and the Latin school of 's-Hertogenbosch. In the Eighty Years' War, times turned bad for the Meierij. The area was literally a battlefield and was heavily plagued by continuous raids. Around 1590 the area was solidly in Spanish hands. Like the southern Dutch states of Flanders and Hainaut, the Duchy Brabant-Limburg had chosen the side of the Catholic Habsburg monarchs of Spain. The strong Catholic Counter-Reformation had had much influence on the population's mentality and culture; the Bailiwick remained Catholic.

Though it was thought impossible, the mighty city of 's-Hertogenbosch was captured by the Dutch Protestants in 1629. As 's-Hertogenbosch was the main capital of the Meierij, the Protestants considered the bailiwick as their possession. However the Spanish kings refused to give it up, and thus one of the most difficult times for the city's people started, the so-called "retorsie tijd" in which the population suffered from both Spanish and Dutch oppression. Finally in 1648 the whole bailiwick was given to the Dutch republic at the Peace of Westphalia.

The former Brabant and Limburg areas were then placed under the reign of the generality as well as Zeelandic Flanders which had been taken from Flanders. Reign of the generality in fact meant nothing else than oppression and colonisation by the Protestants. There was no self-government and Catholicism was forbidden, which resulted in a flight of the Catholic clergy and occupation of the Catholic churches. Due to high taxes and oppression the bailiwick could not restore its old glory and became an intensely poor area without any importance. After the French war of 1795 and the proclamation of the Batavian Republic, the Meierij disappeared as a political unity and went up into Brabant. The people regained their old rights; self-government and Catholicism were not forbidden any longer.

Since 1810 the area has been part of the province of North Brabant and the Kingdom of the Netherlands. Nowadays the area is still known as Meierij and is still mostly cultural Catholic. The population is considered to have a “Burgundian character” by the other Dutch, meaning that they are supposed to be companiable people who like to party exuberantly. (The term recalls the time of Burgundian rule over the Netherlands.)

Around 1900 the area got an enormous growth of population when a combination of reviving Catholicism and economic recovery caused high birthrates. Eindhoven, Tilburg and Helmond developed into major industrial centres.

At the moment the area is again highly developing its industries (especially in Eindhoven and the surrounding region), and is one of the most prosperous areas of the Netherlands and Northwest Europe.

== See also ==
- Brabantse Stedenrij
- BrabantStad
- Samenwerkingsverband Regio Eindhoven
- Apostolic Vicariate of Ravenstein-Megen
