= Halfmijl =

Coordinates: 51°25′02″N 5°19′30″E

- Hamlet
- Interactive map of Halfmijl
- Country: Netherlands
- Province: North Brabant
- Municipality: Veldhoven
- Time zone: UTC+1 (CET)
  - Summer (DST): UTC+2 (CEST)

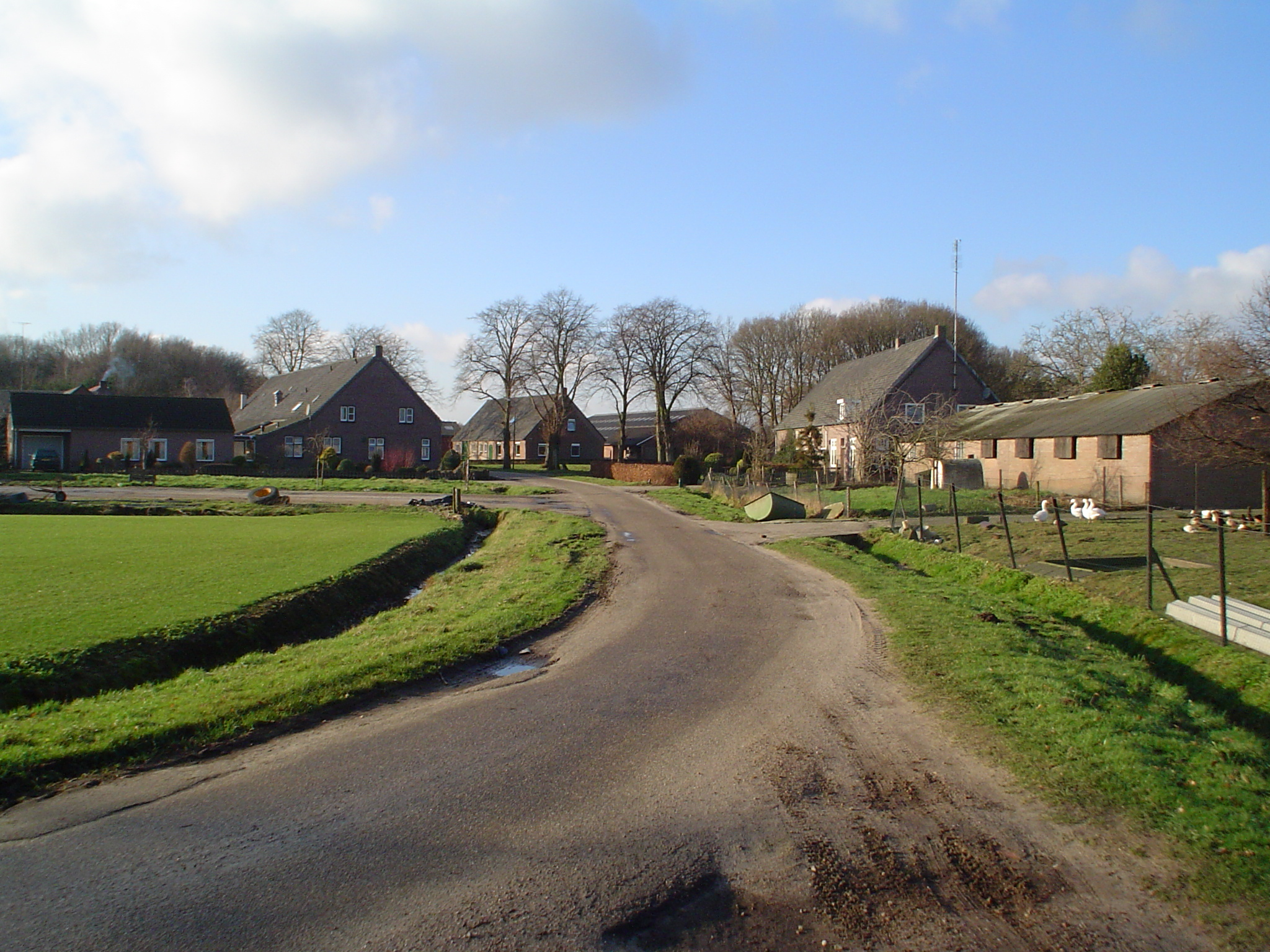
View on Halfmijl from the east

Halfmijl is a hamlet in the west of the municipality of Veldhoven in the province of North Brabant, the Netherlands. The hamlet is located two kilometers east of the village Vessem and consists of eight houses, most of which are farms.

== Etymology ==
The name Halve mijl or Halver Miler was first recorded in the year 1368, as the lastname of a person who originated from this hamlet. Literature does not give an explanation for the name Halfmijl. The hamlet has an isolated location, so the name might be related to the distance from Halfmijl to the nearest settlement.

== History ==
In the Middle Ages, Halfmijl was located in the middle of a large moorland, called the Groote Aard. Due to the isolated location and the presence of tumuli, people felt that the hamlet's surroundings were haunted. Old tales about Halfmijl mention dwarves, witches and will-o'-the-wisps.

South of Halfmijl was a pond owned by the Postel Abbey, called the Postelsche Weijer. This pond was used as a fishing pond and donated to the abbey in 1342, by the inhabitants of the villages Oerle, Knegsel, Vessem and Wintelre. Although the pond has disappeared, a lowland can still be observed near the road Weijerseweg.

Halfmijl has always been a small hamlet. The hamlet consisted of two houses in the year 1688. Four houses were counted in the year 1889.

At the beginning of the twentieth century, the moorland known as the Groote Aard was cultivated. This is now an agricultural area near the roads Grote Aard and Weijerseweg. To the north a forest named Halve Mijl was developed for the production of wood. In this forest is located the Toterfout-Halfmijl tumuli reservation area, containing sixteen restored tumuli from the Bronze Age (1600 - 1000 BC).

== See also ==
- Hilversum culture
