= Vessem, Wintelre en Knegsel =

Former municipality of the Netherlands

Coordinates: 51°25′N 5°17′E

Coat of Arms

Vessem, Wintelre en Knegsel was a municipality in the Dutch province of North Brabant. It was located west of Eindhoven, and covered the villages of Vessem, Wintelre and Knegsel.

The municipality existed until 1997, when it merged with Eersel.
