= Duizel en Steensel =

Coordinates: 51°22′09″N 5°18′31″E

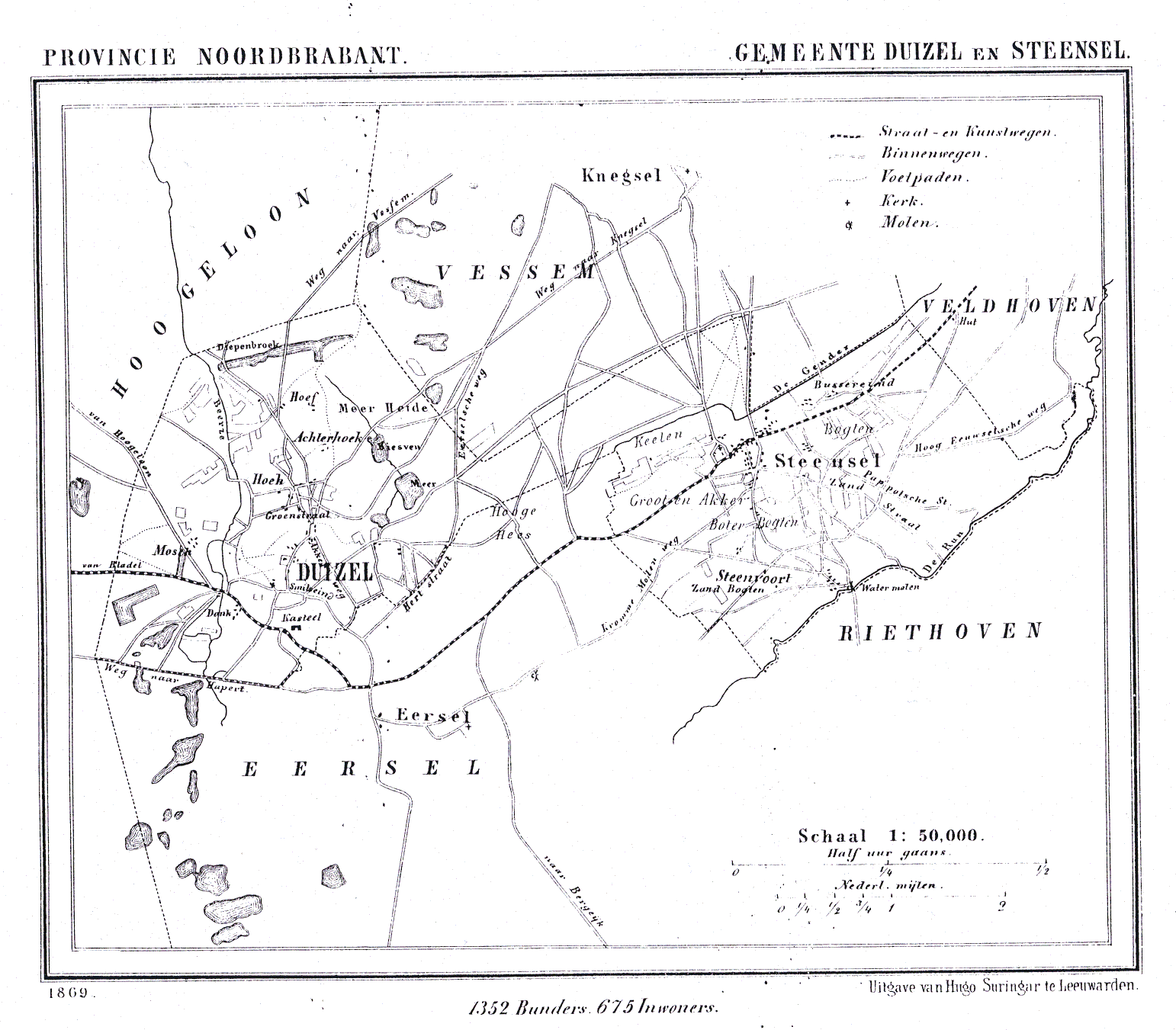
Duizel en Steensel in 1869

Duizel en Steensel is a former municipality in the Dutch province of North Brabant, covering the villages of Duizel and Steensel.

Duizel en Steensel merged with Eersel in 1923.
