= Gender (stream) =

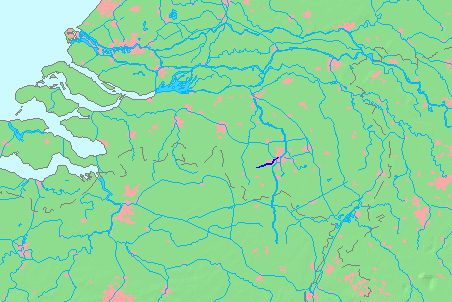
- Location of the Gender in the Dutch province of North Brabant.

Location
- Country: Netherlands

Physical characteristics
- Source
  - location: De Hees hamlet between Eersel and Steensel
  - elevation: 28 m (92 ft)
- Mouth
  - location: (historical and projected) confluence with Dommel stream east of Eindhoven city centre; (current) Engelsbergenvijver pond, Eindhoven
  - coordinates: 51.4347°N 5.4630°E
  - elevation: 15 m (49 ft)
- Length: 15 km (9.3 mi)

Basin features
- Progression: Dommel→ Dieze→ Meuse→ North Sea

The Gender (Dutch pronunciation: [ˈɣɛndər]) is a stream in the Dutch province of North Brabant. It originates in originally marshy flatlands near Steensel and flows through Veldhoven and its eastern district Meerveldhoven in a general east-northeast direction towards Eindhoven.

The Gender is one of many small streams that drain what once was the marshy heath and moorland of eastern North Brabant and the Kempen plateau. Similar streams include the Dommel, Kleine Dommel, Keersop, Tongelreep, Aa, Binnendieze and Run. All of these streams at one point or other merge to finally form River Dieze in Den Bosch, which in turn flows into River Maas.

Near Eindhoven, the Gender originally flowed just north of the medieval city walls, serving as the north part of the city moat, to end in confluence with the Dommel stream. As early as the fifteenth century, its course was diverted southward through the city centre, to provide the city with freshwater supplies and fire-extinguishing means. By the 19th century, the stretch within the old city had been filled in and the Gender now ended in De Vest, the city moat, which itself was connected to the Dommel. Archaeological excavations during the 1980s and 1990s before the construction of a new shopping centre have brought several branches of the artificial inner-city section of the Gender to light, including a connection to the moat of Eindhoven Castle, which stood just east of the city walls.

20th-century channelisation and the emergence of large-scale residential areas in the Gender basin have seen the last stretch before the city centre cut off. In order to regulate water levels of the Dommel and Gender streams, which occasionally threatened to flood Eindhoven's inner city area, a drainage canal (Afwateringskanaal) was dug in the late 1930s to connect the Dommel to the newly constructed Beatrix Canal and so dispose of excess water. Into this canal the Gender now discharges. A further downstream section of the Gender between the canal and the Engelsbergen pond remains, but receives little water of the original stream. Two districts of Eindhoven that are situated on its banks were named after the Gender stream: Genderdal ('Gender Dale') and Genderbeemd ('Gender Meadow').

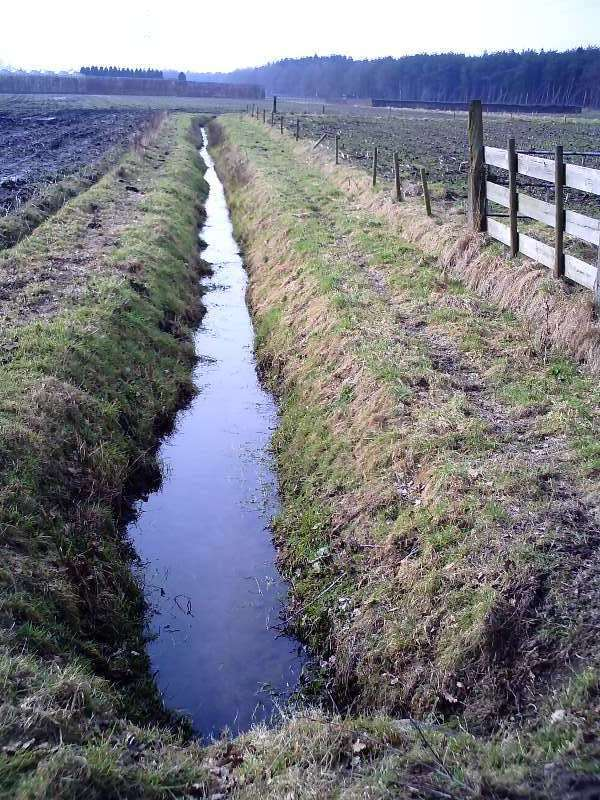
Headwaters of the Gender stream just north of Steensel. View is to the west (upstream).

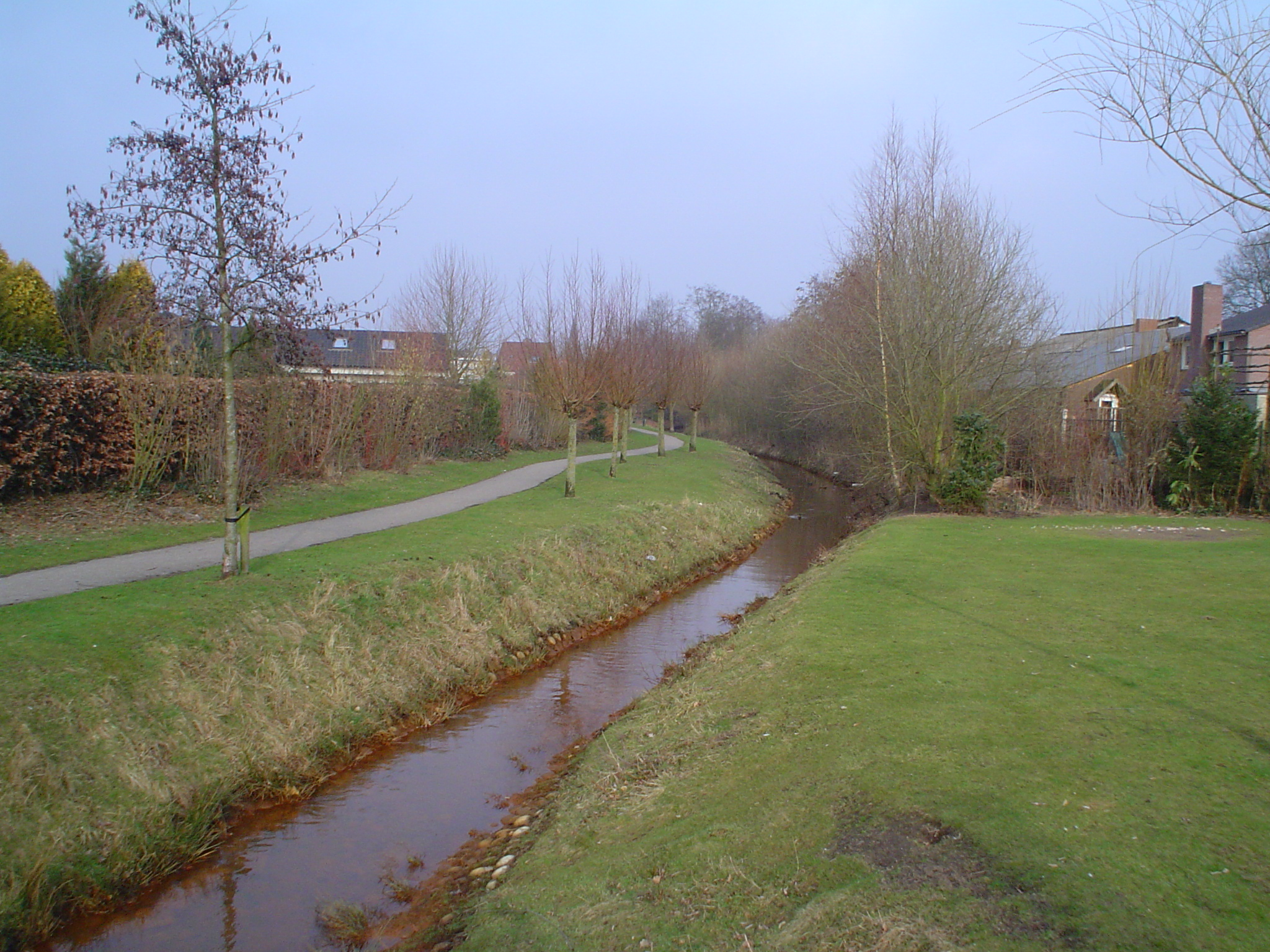
The Gender in the western suburbs of Veldhoven.

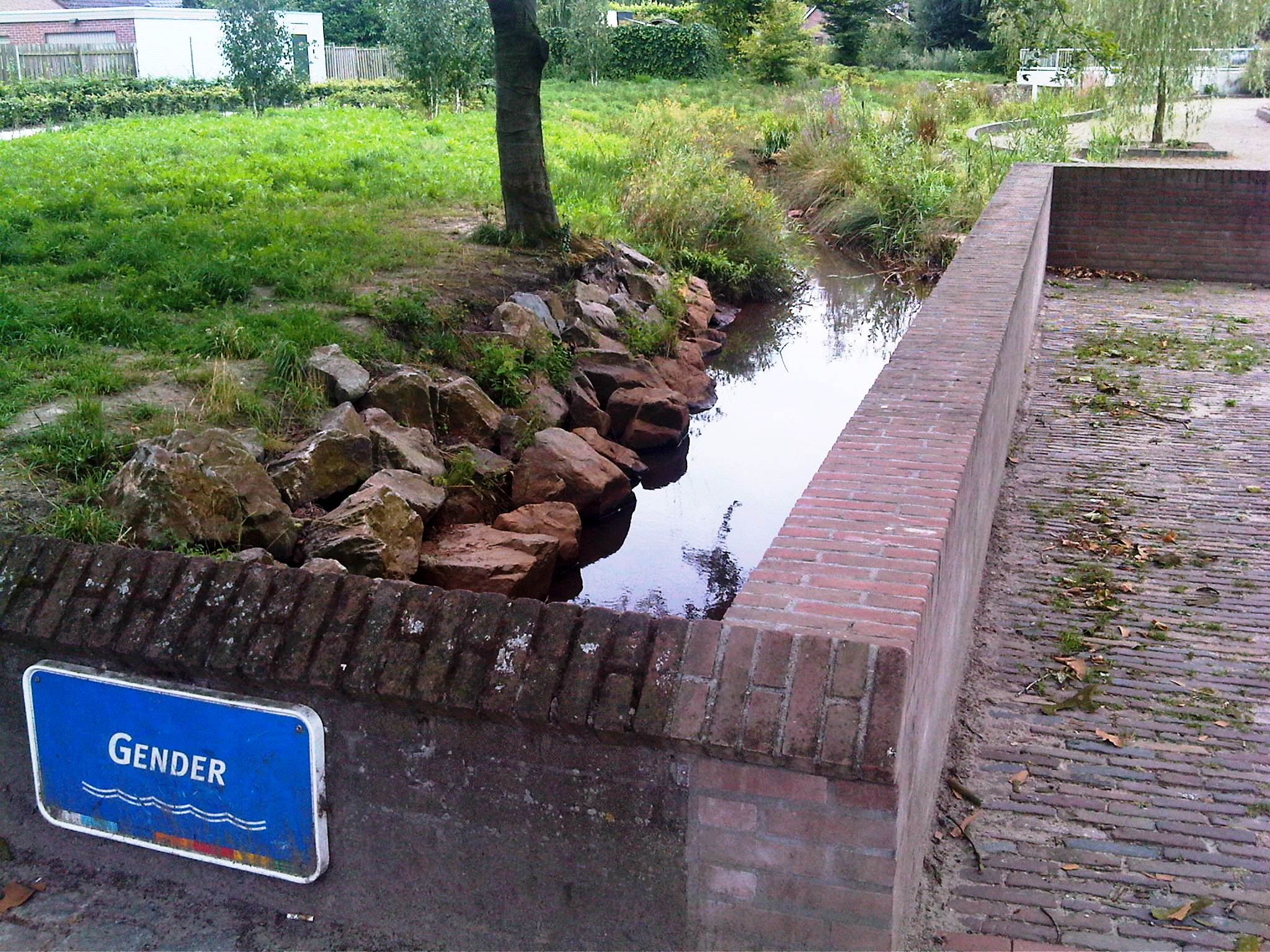
The Gender as it passes under a bridge in the old village centre of Veldhoven proper. View is to the west (upstream).

== Nieuwe Gender ==
In 2005, proposals were accepted to have the Gender flow through the Eindhoven city centre once again: the Nieuwe Gender ('New Gender') project. The stream is to flow partially underground, partially above-ground from the Engelsbergen pond through the city centre and discharge into the Dommel near the railway station. As of the summer of 2006, large-scale city centre reconstruction plans have included the implementation of the Nieuwe Gender, which is still in progress.

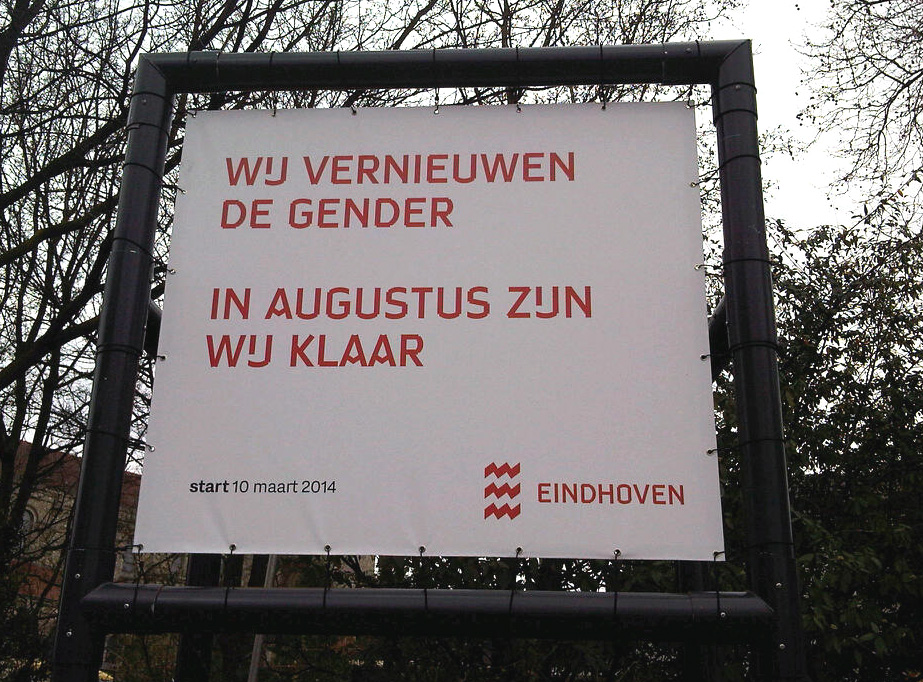
Billboard announcing work on the Nieuwe Gender in 2015.

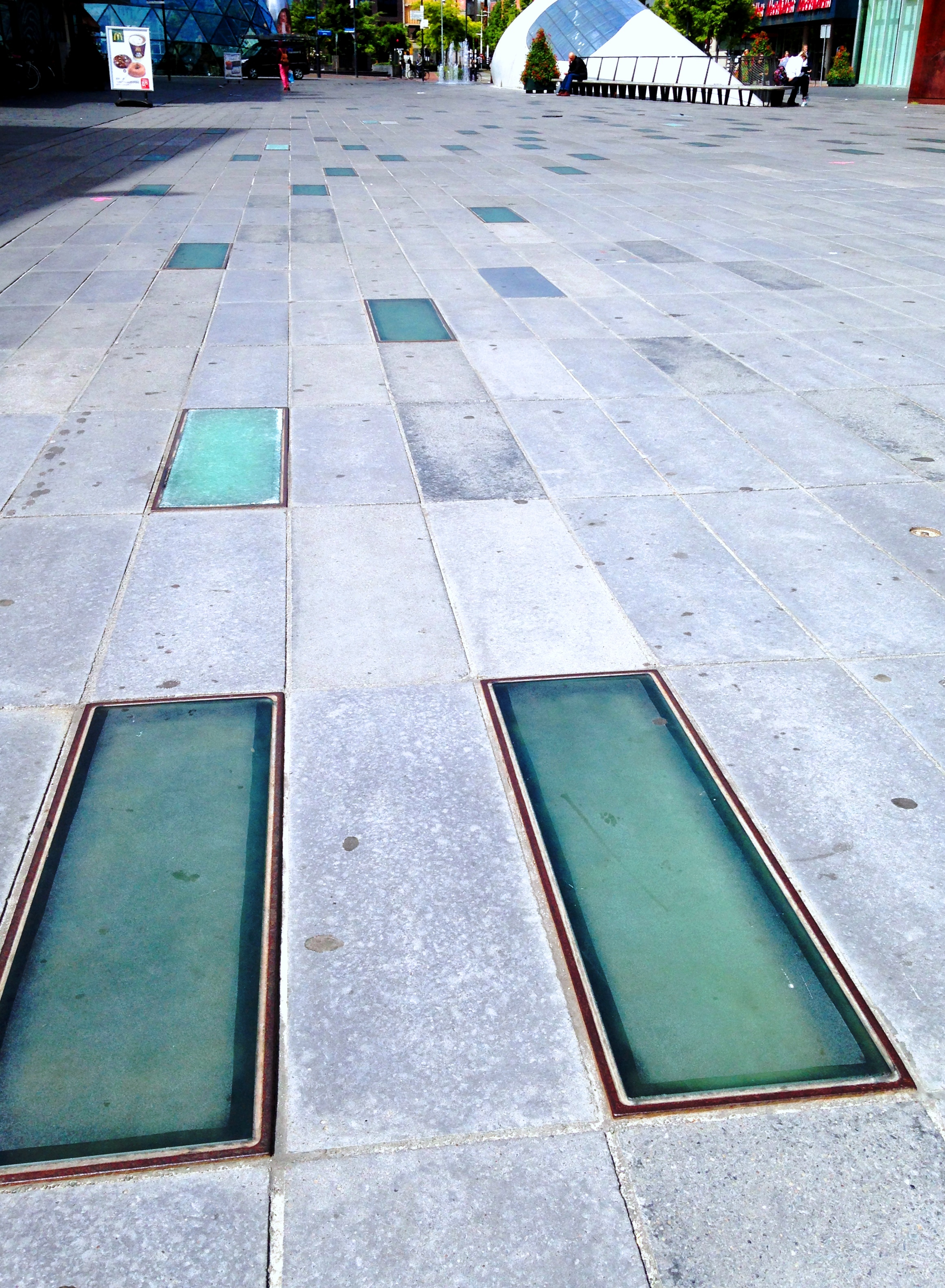
Blue tiles in the city centre of Eindhoven, laid in 2006 to mark the underground course of the Gender as part of the Nieuwe Gender project.
