= Duizel =

- Village
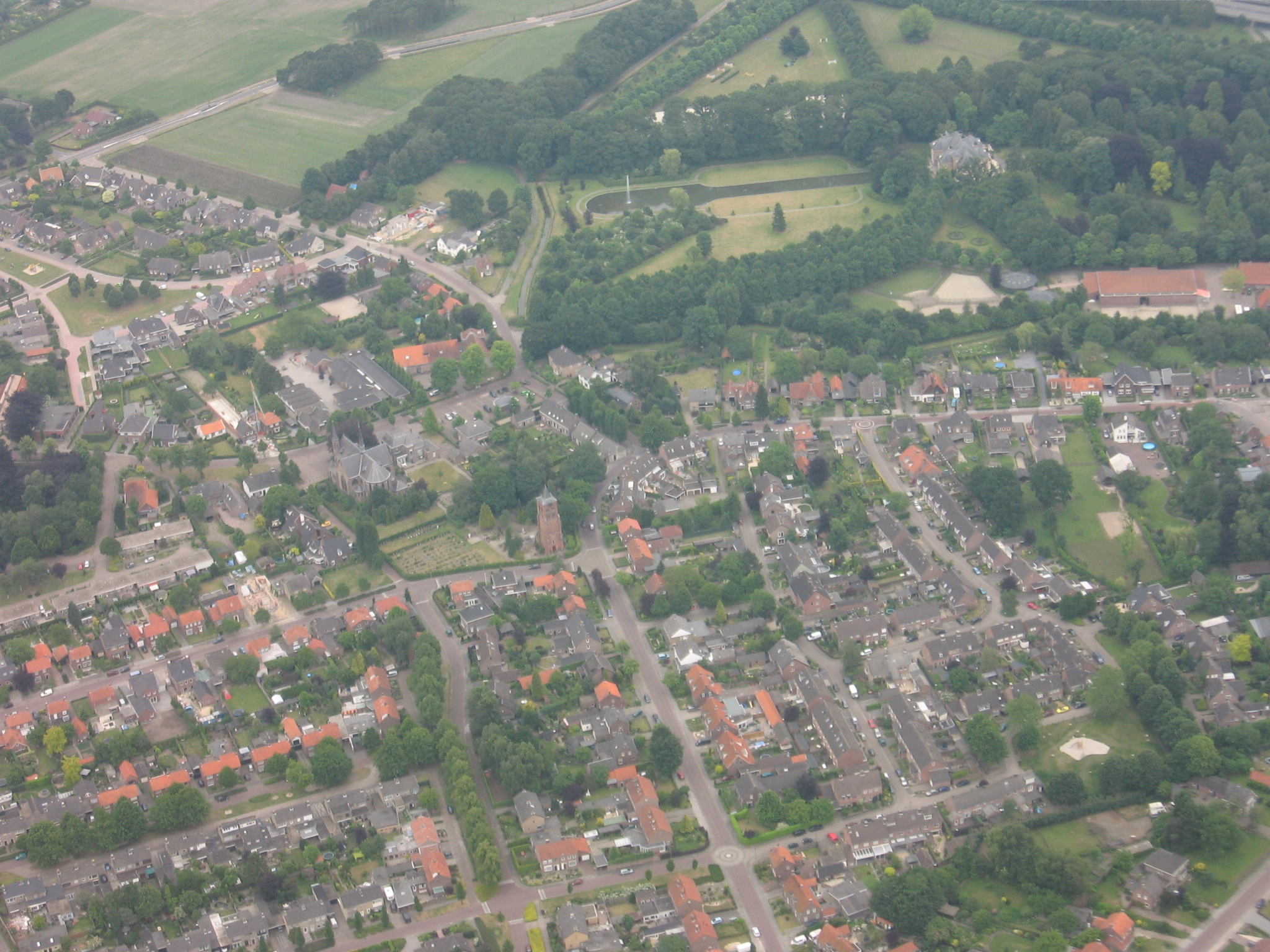
- Aerial view of Duizel

- Location in the province of North Brabant in the Netherlands Duizel (Netherlands)
- Coordinates: 51°22′N 5°18′E
- Country: Netherlands
- Province: North Brabant
- Municipality: Eersel

Area
  - Total: 6.54 km^{2} (2.53 sq mi)
- Elevation: 29 m (95 ft)

Population (2021)
  - Total: 2,000
  - Density: 310/km^{2} (790/sq mi)
- Time zone: UTC+1 (CET)
  - Summer (DST): UTC+2 (CEST)
- Postal code: 5525
- Dialing code: 0497

Duizel is a village in the municipality of Eersel in the province of North Brabant, the Netherlands. Duizel is part of the Acht Zaligheden (Eight Beatitudes), like Eersel, Knegsel, Steensel, Wintelre, Netersel, Hulsel and Reusel.

The village was first mentioned before 1026 as Duselam, and named after a gentle flowing stream. Duizel is a road village which developed along the Kleine Beerze.

The tower of the St John Church dates from the 15th century. The matching church was demolished in 1927. The St John's Birth Church was built in 1925 in basilica style.

During the 19th century, Duizel developed into a centre for the cigar industry. Duizel was home to 296 people in 1840. It was part of the municipality of Duizel en Steensel until 1922 when it was merged into Eersel.

== Gallery ==
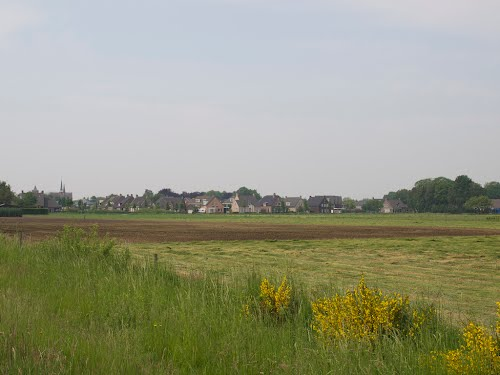
Duizel

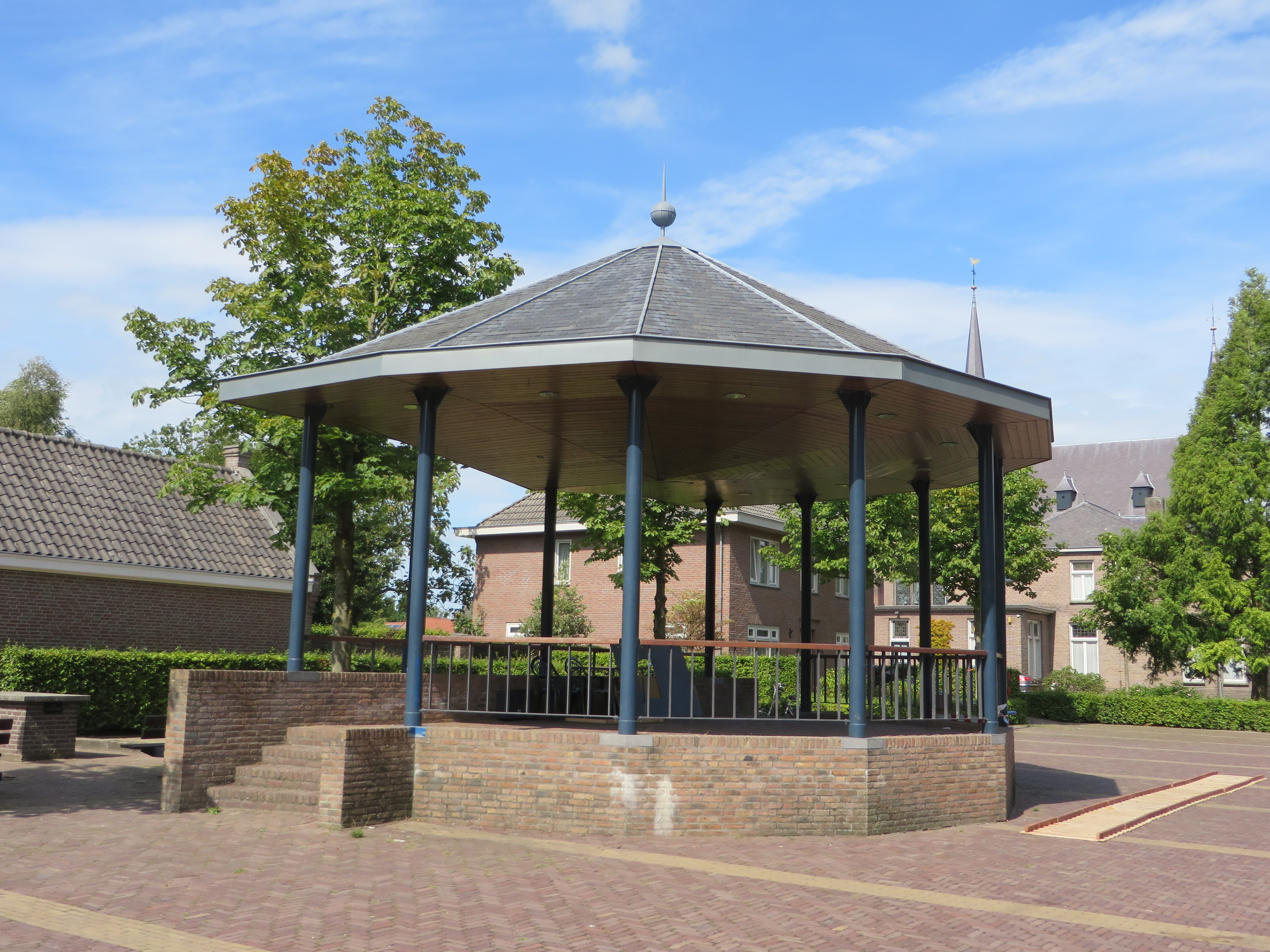
Bandstand

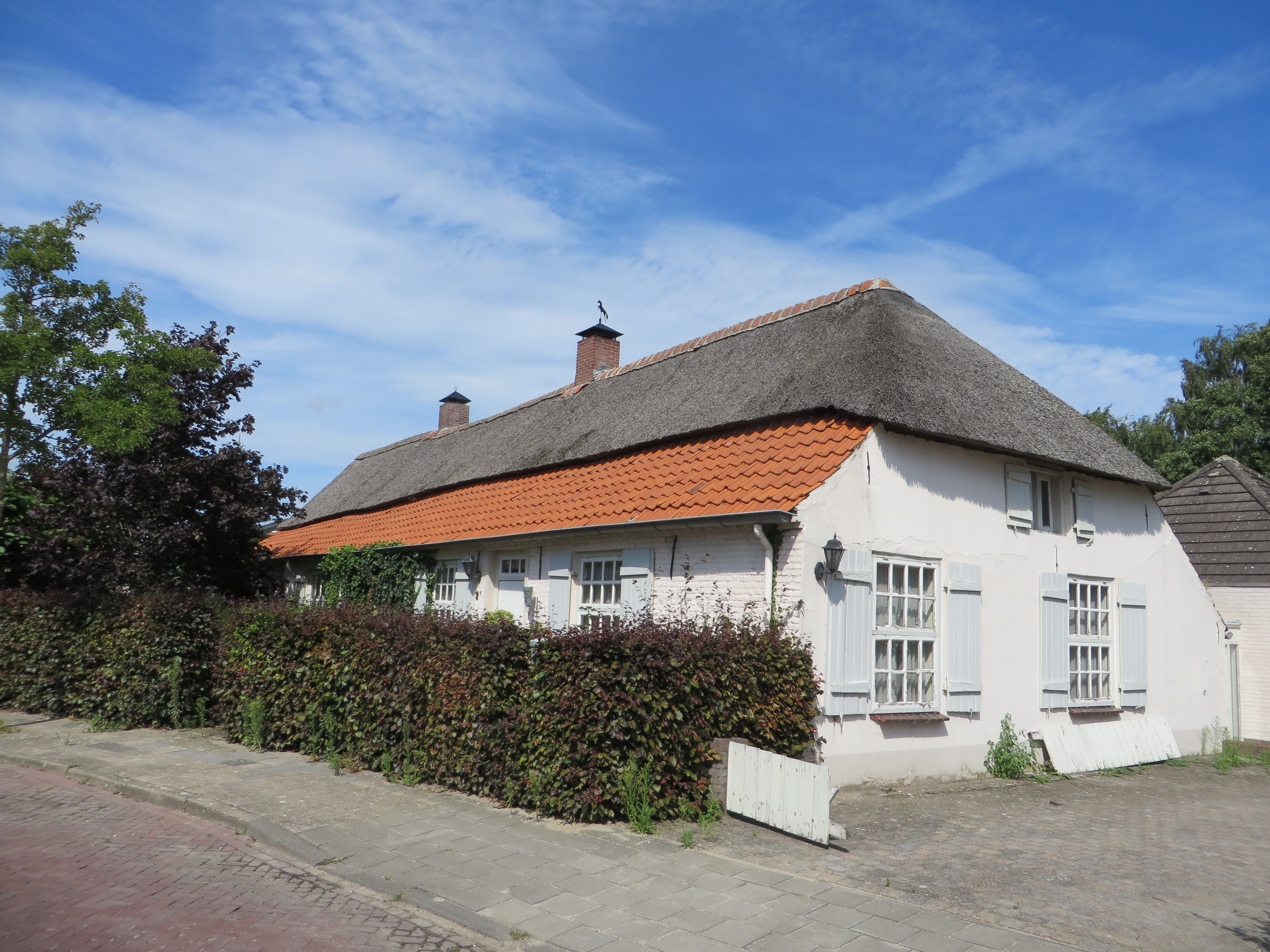
House in Duizel

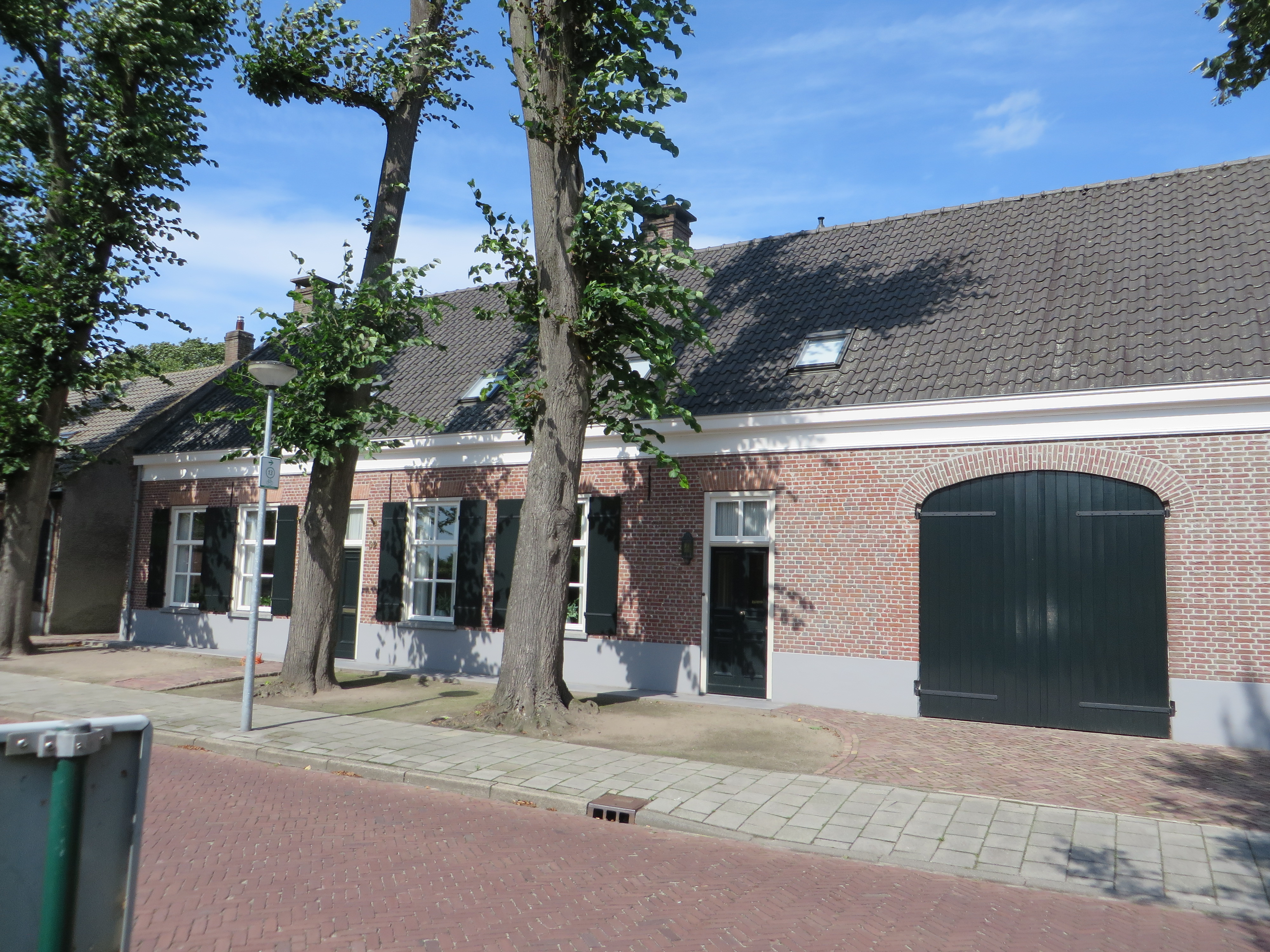
House in Duizel
