= Eersel =

- Municipality
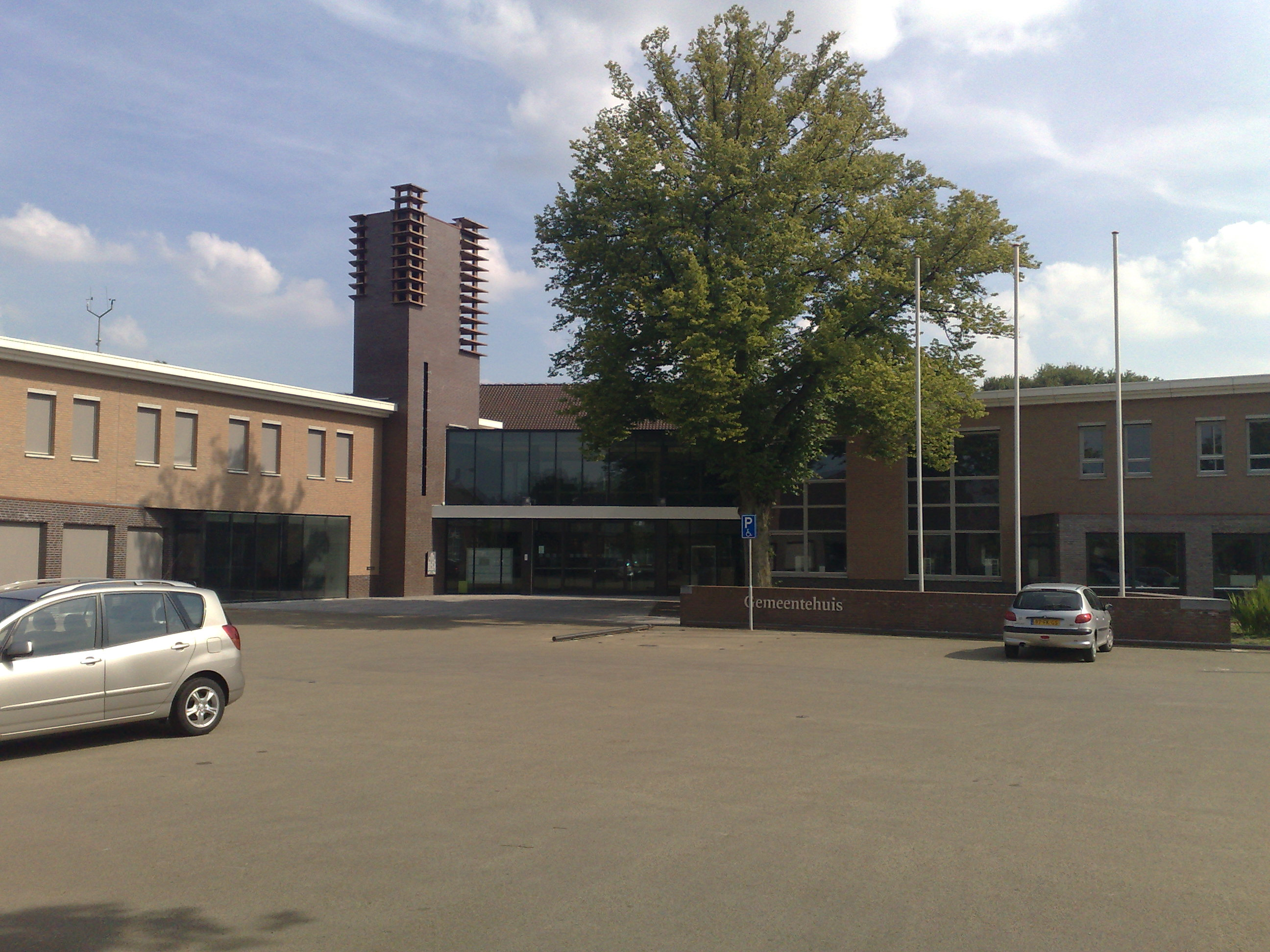
- Eersel municipal hall

- Flag Coat of arms

- Location in North Brabant
- Coordinates: 51°21′N 5°19′E
- Country: Netherlands
- Province: North Brabant

Government
  - Body: Municipal council
  - Mayor: Wim Wouters

Area
  - Total: 83.33 km^{2} (32.17 sq mi)
  - Land: 82.46 km^{2} (31.84 sq mi)
  - Water: 0.87 km^{2} (0.34 sq mi)
- Elevation: 31 m (102 ft)

Population (January 2021)
  - Total: 19,528
  - Density: 237/km^{2} (610/sq mi)
- Demonym: Eerselnaar
- Time zone: UTC+1 (CET)
  - Summer (DST): UTC+2 (CEST)
- Postcode: 5511–5525
- Area code: 040, 0497
- Website: www.eersel.nl

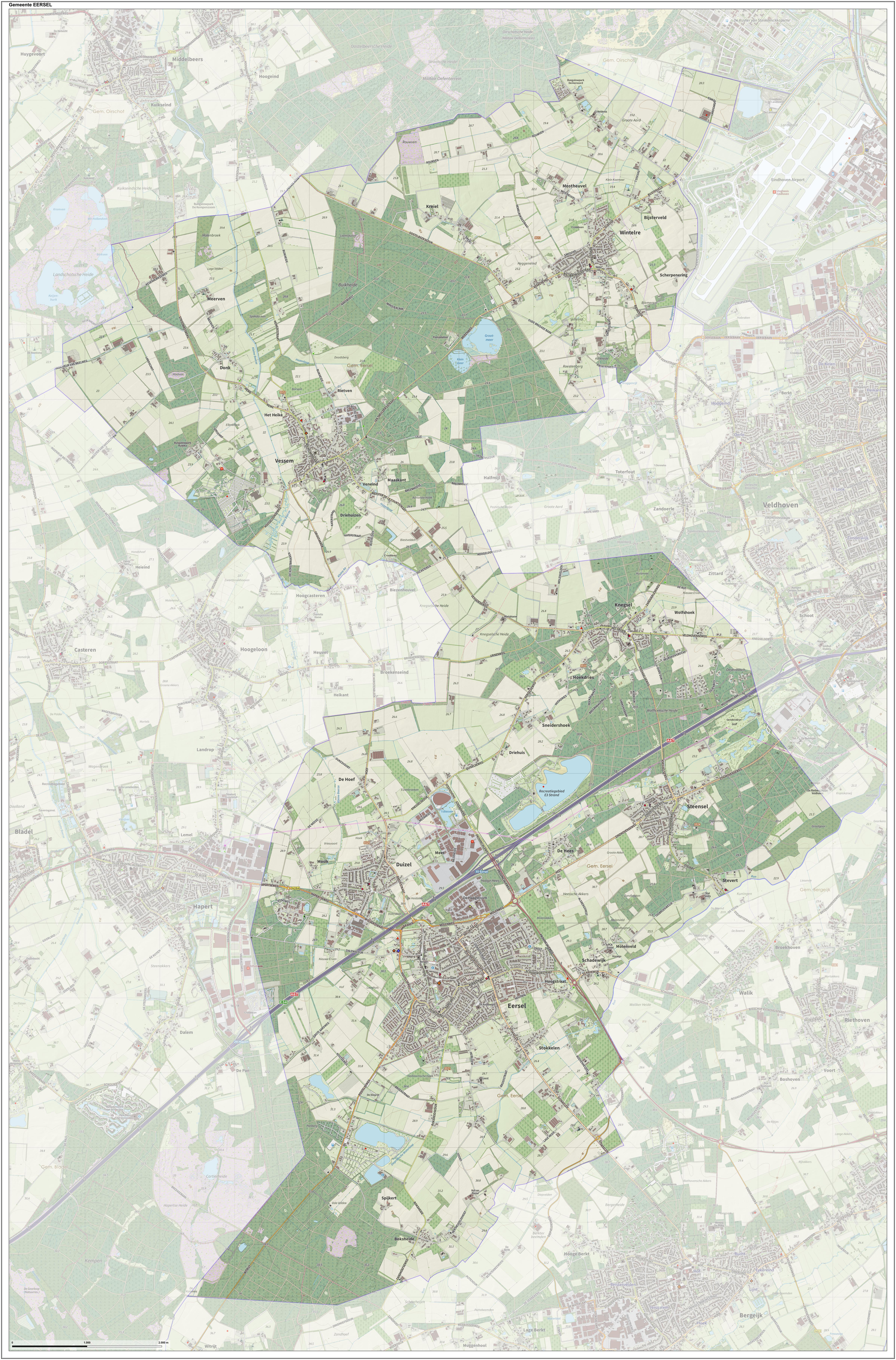
Dutch Topographic map of Eersel, June 2015

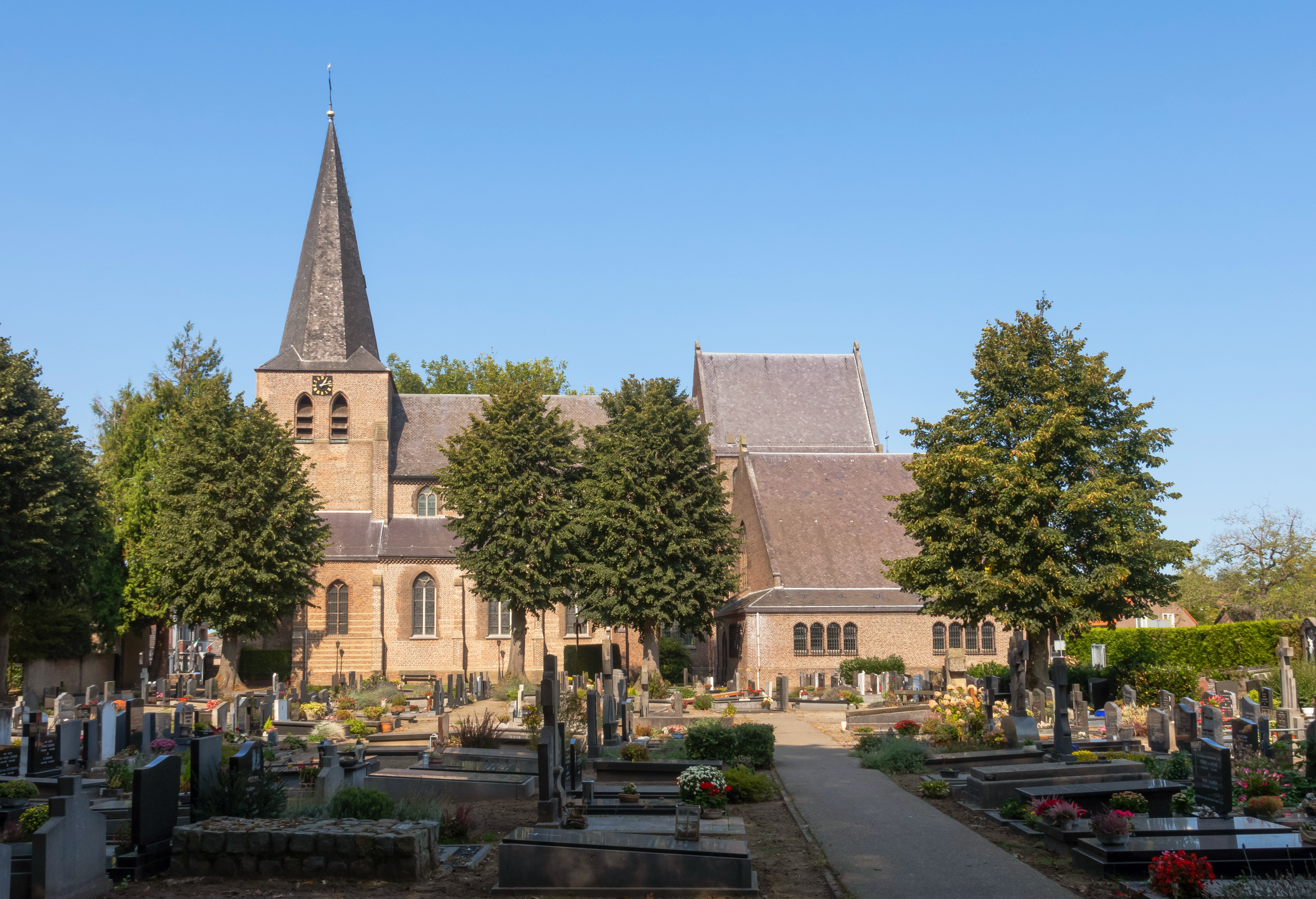
Eersel, church: the Sint-Willibrorduskerk

Eersel (Dutch pronunciation: [ˈeːrsəl]) is a municipality and a town in southern Netherlands in the province of North Brabant. Eersel is situated in the Campine (Kempen) area.

Eersel is part of the Acht Zaligheden (Eight Beatitudes) and known for its attractive market. This market, together with the Hint, has been declared a protected village on 19 October 1967. This has been done to guarantee the future survival of its authentic character.

The spoken language is Kempenlands (an East Brabantian dialect, which is very similar to colloquial Dutch).

== Population centres ==
- Duizel
- Eersel
- Knegsel
- Steensel
- Vessem
- Wintelre

== History ==
About 3,500 years ago the first inhabitants of the area of Eersel were builders of sepulchre hillocks or burial mounds of the Tumulus culture. Following them in the late Bronze Age the people of the Urnfield culture continued living there as has been proved by the urn with cremating ashes that has been found in ‘Schadewijk’. Before the Romans occupied this area, which they called Toxandria, the Eburones lived here. From the Roman period there are also archaeological finds. Many shards of Roman pottery are found between the church of Eersel and the hamlet ‘Schadewijk’. The Salian Franks that settled the area in the 4th century became known as Toxandrians. After the Roman time the region has been virtually depopulated.

The Franks established themselves round 700 again in the region. They lived where high and lower grounds were laying close to each other. One of those high grounds was Ereslo. As from this time there is a form of government authority in this area. The Franks build their farms around a triangular square. This kind of settlement was called a domain which was the property of the high nobility of the Franks.

The oldest known written indication of Eersel is found in the manuscript Codex Aureus of Echternach (or Liber Aureus) of the Abbey of Echternach. In this document is a charter included in which a certain Aengilbertus, son of late Gaobertus, with approval of his brother Verengaotus gives the property of the domain Eresloch to Saint Willibrord. In this registration of the year 712 the name of ‘Ereslo’ was transferred wrong to ‘Eresloch’. Wilibrord on his behalf gave the heritage to the Abbey of Echternach in Luxembourg. To approximately the year 1000 Eersel belonged to the county of Taxandria. Thereafter it came under the influence of earl of Guelders. The Earl of Leuven extends its area to the north and in 1203 the region definitively became a part of Brabant. Trading started to develop and Eersel became a cross point for the routes of Leuven and 's-Hertogenbosch and of Antwerp and Turnhout. The triangular court of the village 'Hint' (now still visible), was extended in southern direction. The new oval square became ‘de Markt’ (the Market) constructed for the trade as a parking place for carts. Around arose the characteristic buildings for digest and boardinghouses such as taverns. But also stables for horses with the requirements like a blacksmith. In 1325 Eersel obtained the rights of ‘freedom’ (Town privileges) from Duke Jan III of Brabant. On this basis the inhabitants could designate as of now their own governor. Eersel became the head of regional schepenbank of Hapert, Hoogeloon, Vessem, Knegsel, Steensel, Bergeijk, Westerhoven, Dommelen en Borkel en Schaft.

Around the 14th century Eersel became prosperous and the monumental tower of Eersel was built, together with those of Steensel and Duizel. In 1464 between the market and ‘het Hint’ a chapel was built in Eersel.

After the Middle Ages the region became more poorly and the villages did not grow between 1500 and 1800. This is the period of the ‘Teuten’ a traveling trading people, who were touring from village to village with artisan and merchant services, like coppersmith, wig-maker, also some veterinary surgeon like horse, ram, bull and pig castrating, and trade in goods like pottery, kitchen-utensil, bed-clothes, linen, lace, silk and other textile manufactures. They were no gypsies but build their homes in a central place like Eersel and traveled to other regions and lands from there. One of the remainder of this time are the houses of the ‘Teuten’ at the market. In 1800 at the time of King Willem I there came some improvement. The provincial road to Eindhoven and the road to Postel was hardened and a steam tram railway was manufactured. (1897)

In 1923 Eersel absorbed the former municipality of Duizel en Steensel. Since 1900 the reclaiming of cleared bush ground had taken place and the rise of the cigar industry. During the crisis, the cigar industry ensured that unemployment was not very large, although the living then in Eersel was reasonable poverty. Eersel still enjoys a reputation as one of the largest cigar exporters of the Netherlands and takes still an important place on the world market of cigar producers. After the Second World War there was a fast increase of population from 3,700 to 12,500 inhabitants in Eersel.

== Places of interest ==
- The church of Saint Willibrord

The original version of the church of Eersel was a simply wooden cottage and was possibly founded by the (Catholic) abbey of Echternach . The church was mentioned for the first time in 1480. Tower dates from second half of the 14th century. The flaunting piece of the church is the monumental organ. It was entirely restored in 1972, under realm monument care. It is a combination of work of two famous organ builders: Bernard Petrus van Hirtum from Hilvarenbeek (1838) and the Smits Brothers from Reek (1852).

- The Chapel of Our Lady of Campina

It is built in 1464 in Gothic style and is the oldest building of the market. After the Peace of Münster it was closed for mass service and was used as Council house, as prison and repository for the fire-engine. It was used for 300 years as a townhall up to 1948 before it was returned to the church and used as a chapel again.

- Protestant church

The Protestant church was built first in 1812, and has been rebuilt in 1861. It is a simple barge stone build church. The ceiling has an arbor, contributing to very good acoustics.

== Notable residents ==
- Bertus Borgers (born 1947 in Vessem) a Dutch saxophone player
- Wil van der Aalst (born 1966 in Eersel) a Dutch computer scientist and academic

== Gallery ==
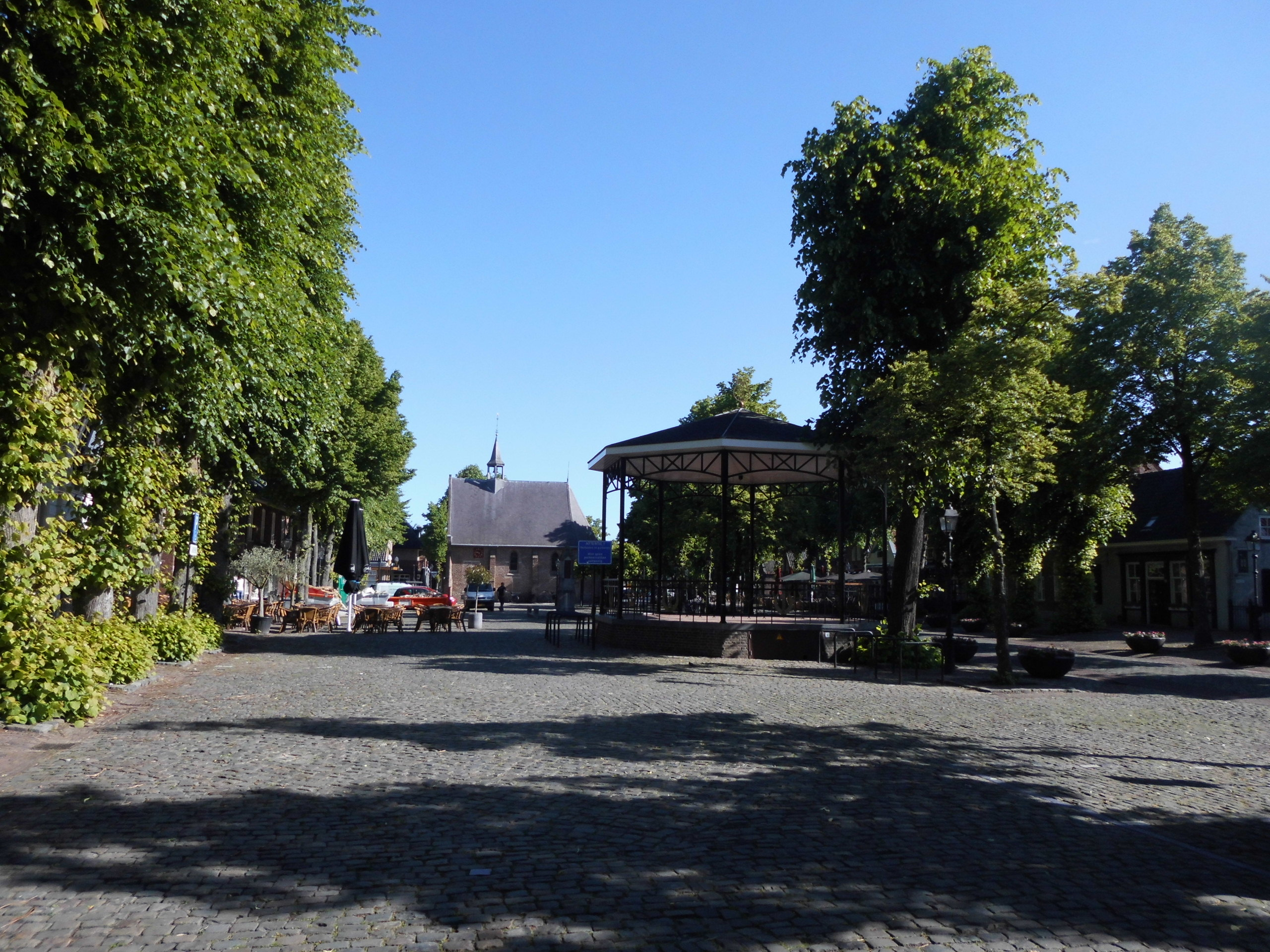
De Markt van Eersel (gemeente en plaats)

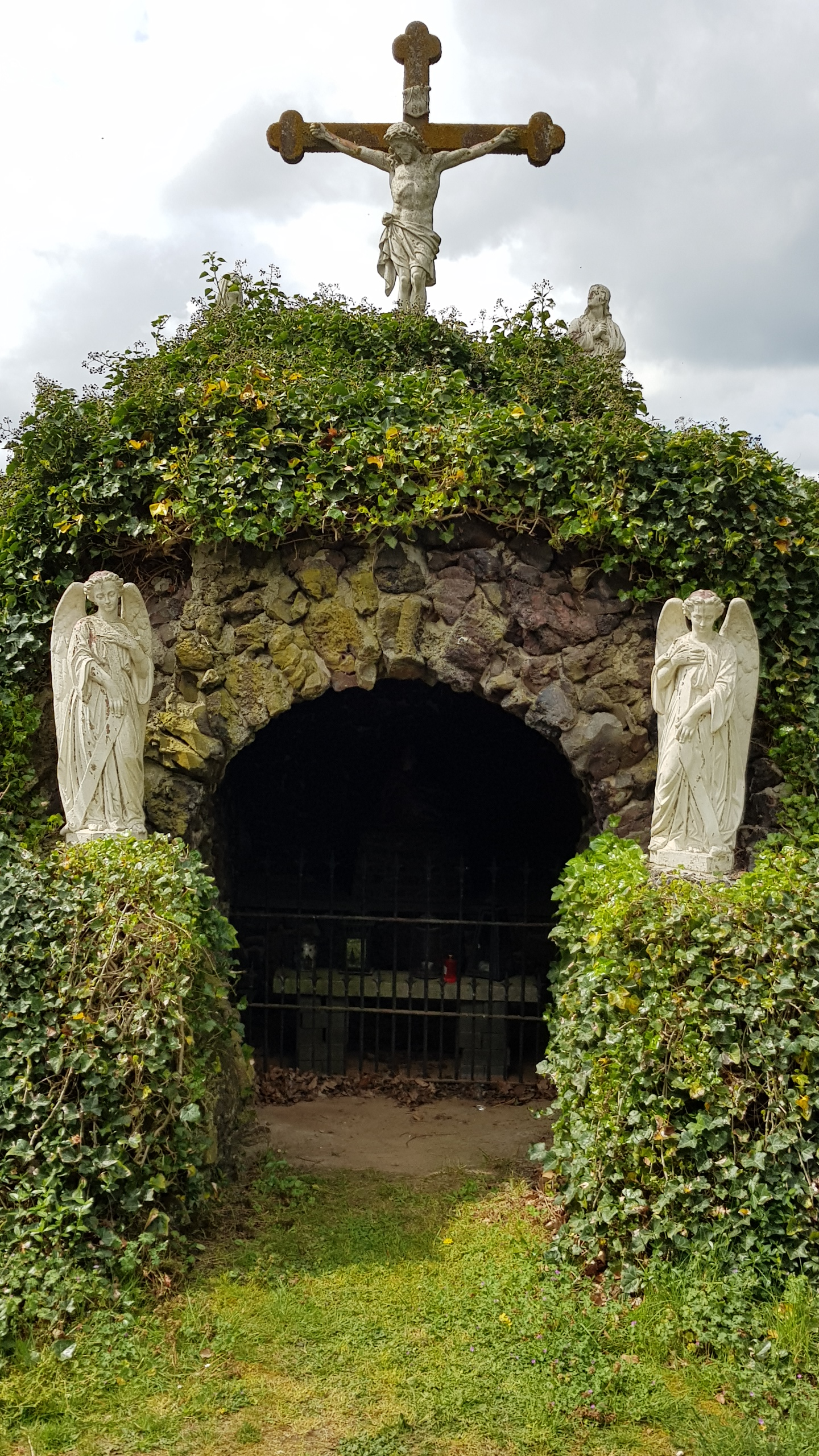
Kapel begraafplaats kerk Vessem

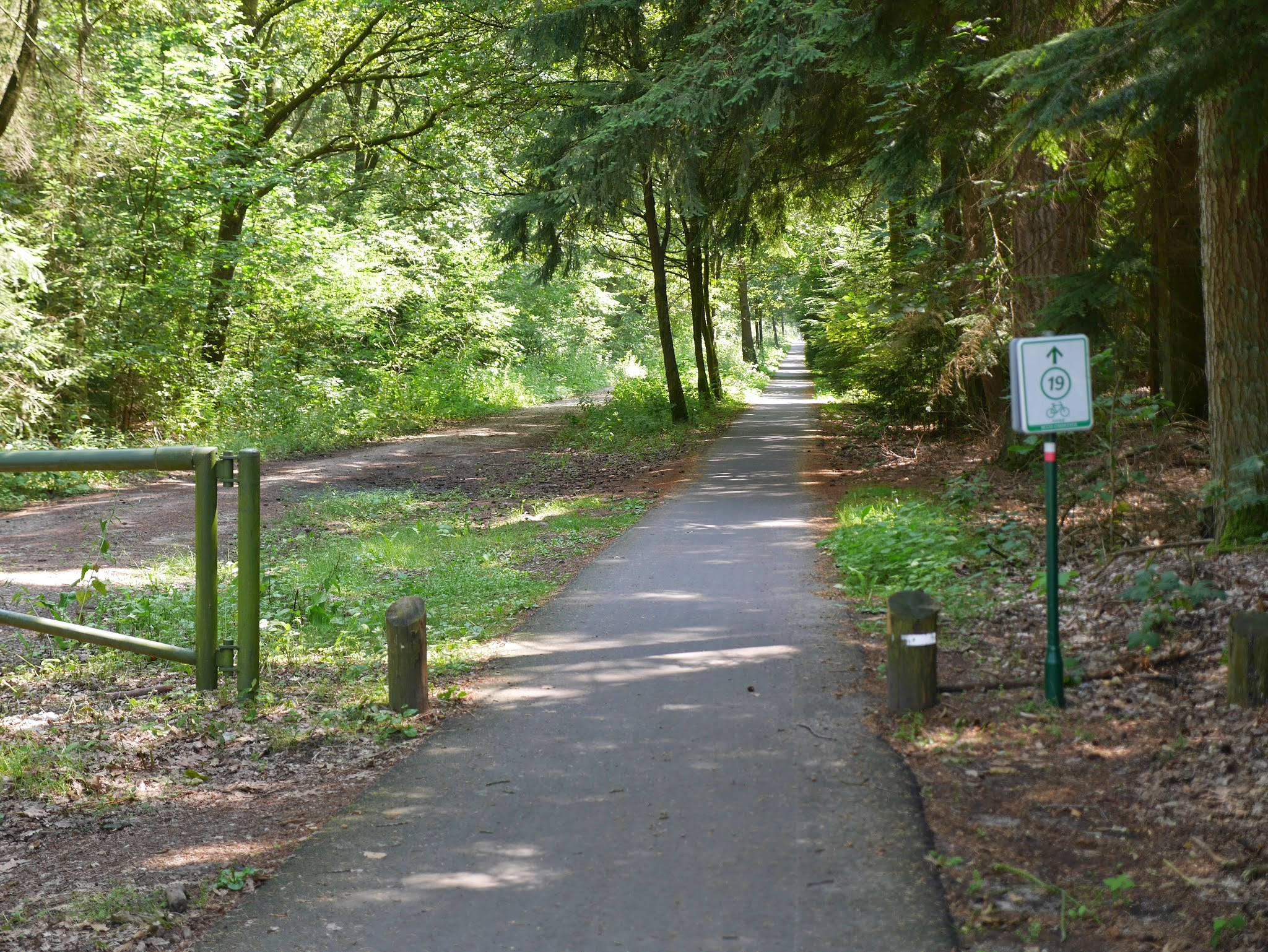
Eersel

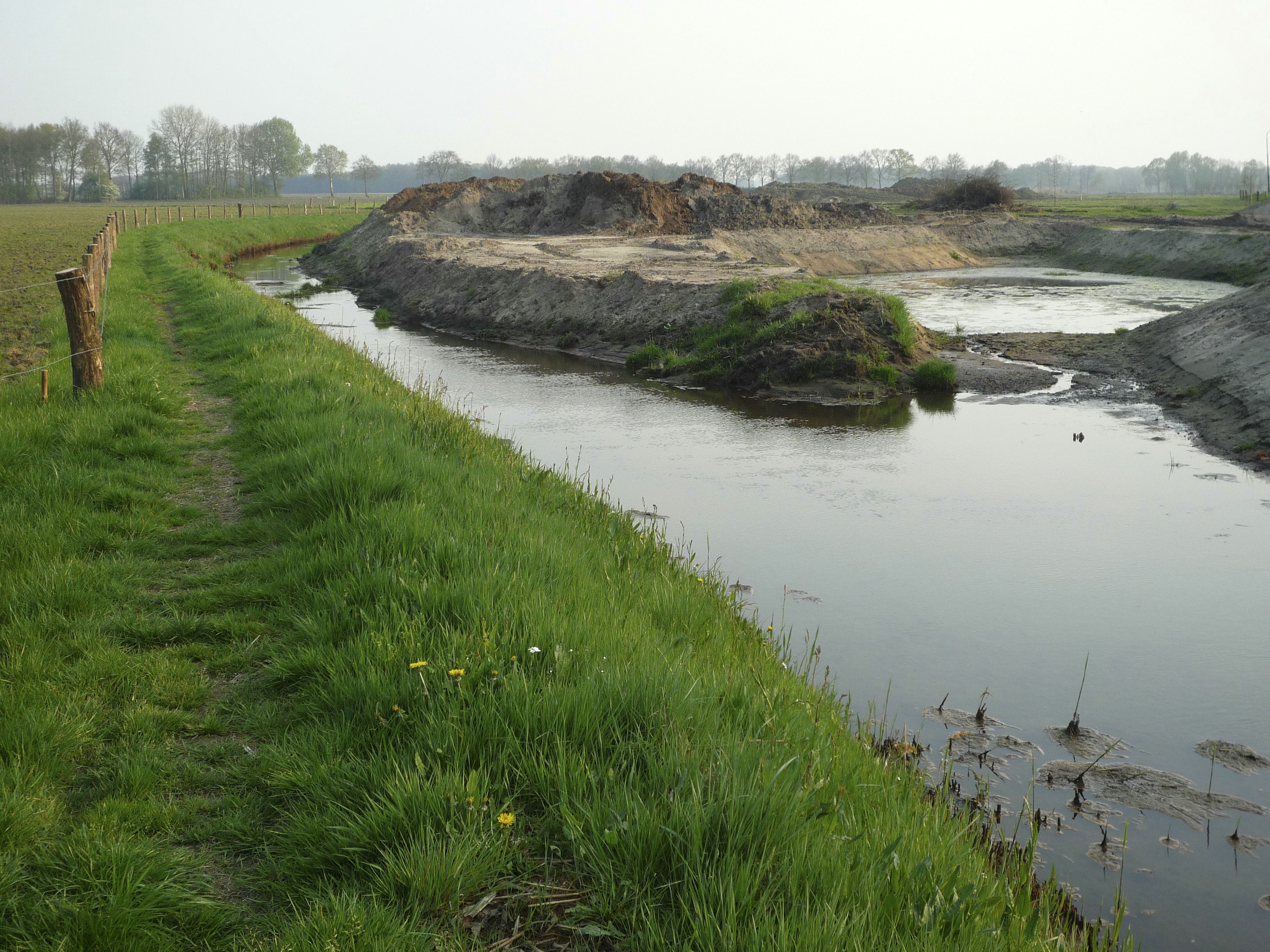
Overzicht beekherstel - Vessem
