= Steensel =

- Village
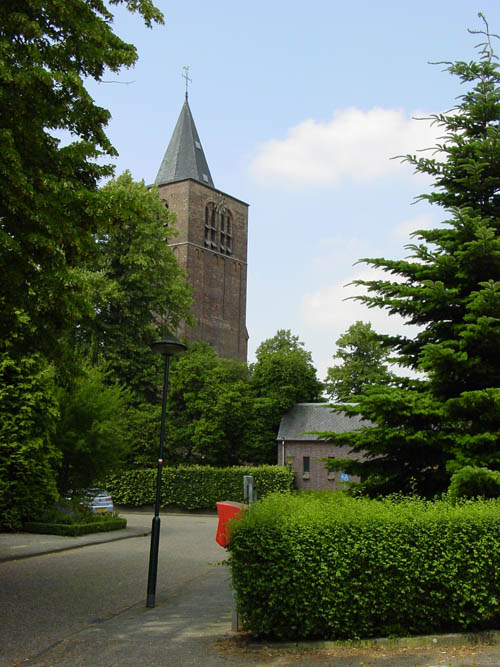
- Tower of the church of Steensel

- Location in the province of North Brabant in the Netherlands Steensel (Netherlands)
- Coordinates: 51°23′N 5°21′E
- Country: Netherlands
- Province: North Brabant
- Municipality: Eersel

Area
  - Total: 6.13 km^{2} (2.37 sq mi)
- Elevation: 25 m (82 ft)

Population (2021)
  - Total: 1,475
  - Density: 241/km^{2} (623/sq mi)
- Time zone: UTC+1 (CET)
  - Summer (DST): UTC+2 (CEST)
- Postal code: 5524
- Dialing code: 0497

Steensel is a village on the Gender stream in the municipality of Eersel, North Brabant, the Netherlands. Steensel is part of the Acht Zaligheden (Eight Beatitudes), along with Eersel, Knegsel, Duizel, Wintelre, Netersel, Hulsel en Reusel.

The name Steensel appeared first in a document from 1224, in which a certain Henricus and Marcelis were mentioned as knights of Steensel. In 1688, Steensel was plundered and destroyed by French soldiers. In 1810, Steensel became part of the municipality of Duizel and Steensel. Steensel was home to 282 people in 1840. In 1922, this municipality then merged into the municipality of Eersel.

== Gallery ==
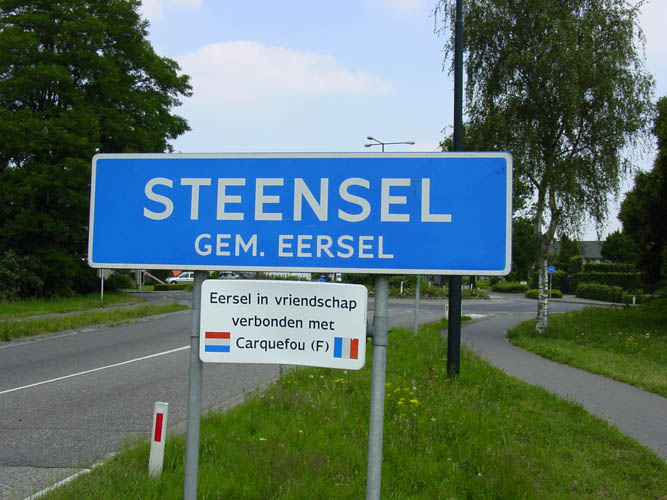
Entrance to Steensel

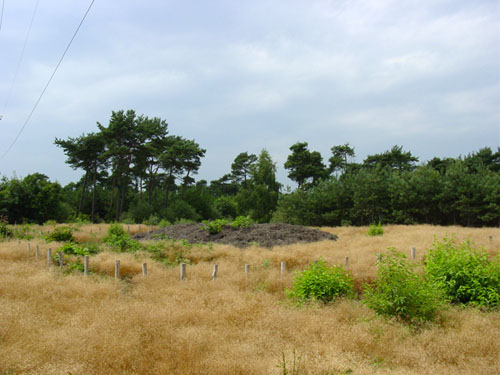
Burial mound

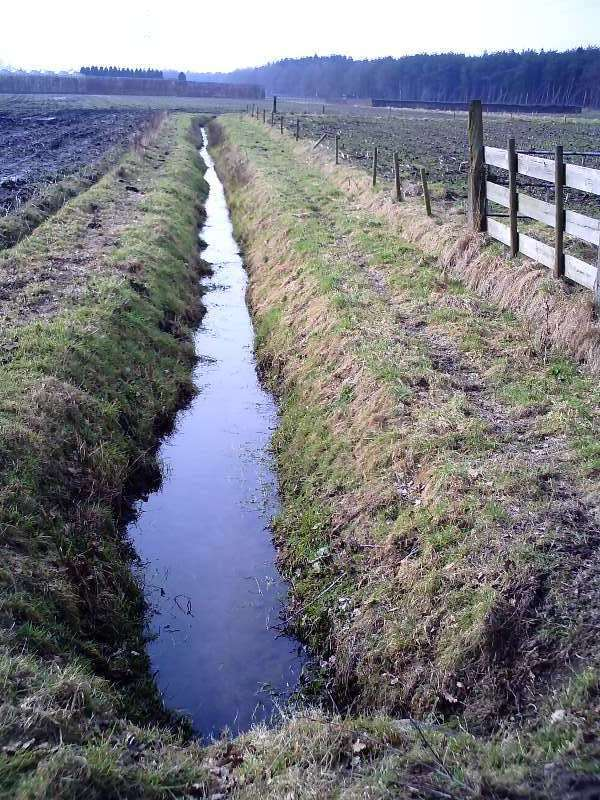
Headwaters of the Gender stream near Steensel
