= Knegsel =

- Village
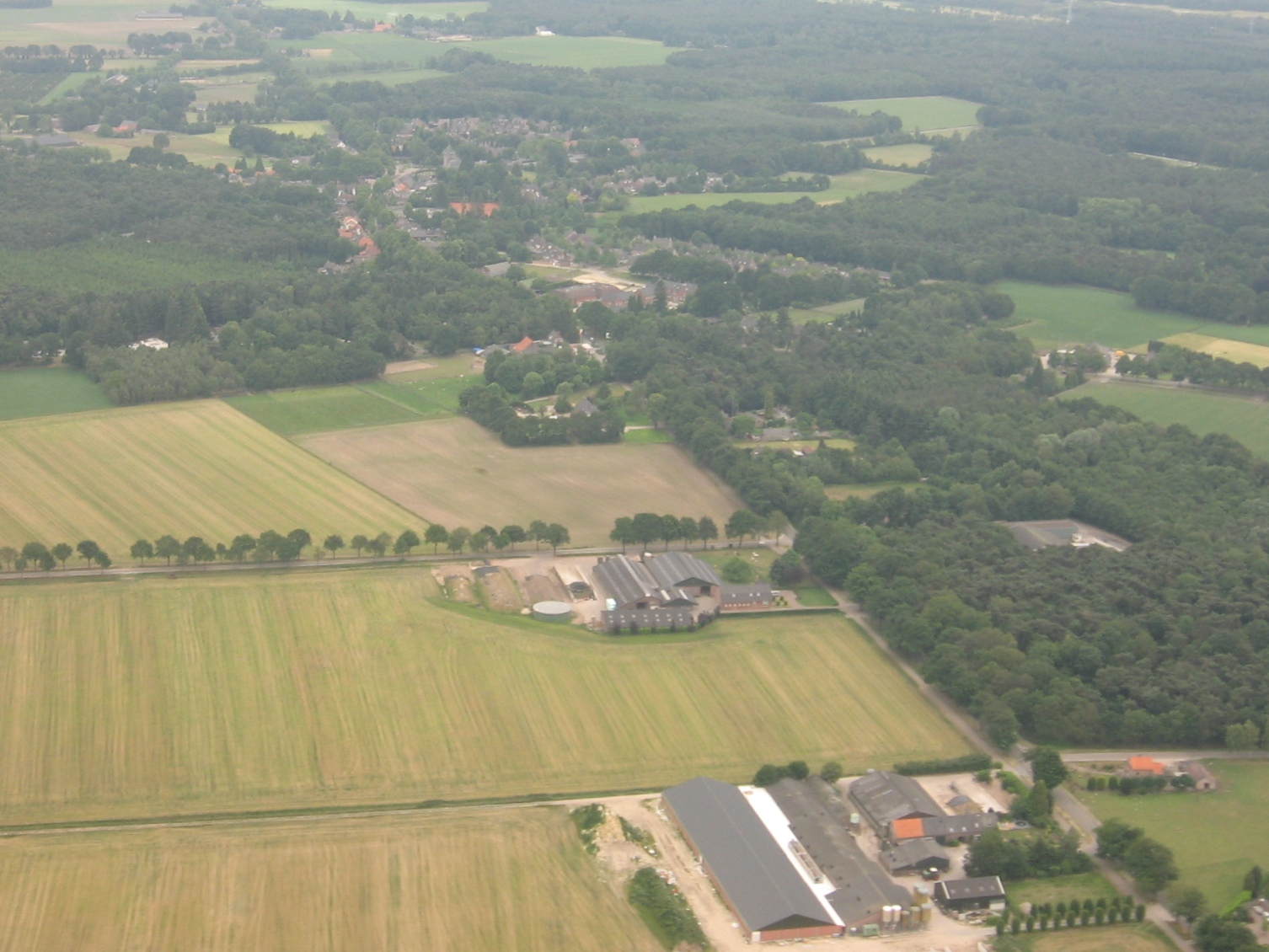
- Aerial view of Knegsel

- Location in the province of North Brabant in the Netherlands Knegsel (Netherlands)
- Coordinates: 51°24′N 5°21′E
- Country: Netherlands
- Province: North Brabant
- Municipality: Eersel

Area
  - Total: 10.94 km^{2} (4.22 sq mi)
- Elevation: 26 m (85 ft)

Population (2021)
  - Total: 1,400
  - Density: 130/km^{2} (330/sq mi)
- Time zone: UTC+1 (CET)
  - Summer (DST): UTC+2 (CEST)
- Postal code: 5511
- Dialing code: 040

Knegsel is a village in the south of the Netherlands. It is located in the municipality of Eersel, North Brabant. Knegsel is part of the Acht Zaligheden (Eight Beatitudes), alongside Eersel, Duizel, Steensel, Wintelre, Netersel, Hulsel en Reusel.

The village was first mentioned in 1281 as Cneczele, and means "single room house belonging to the servant".

Knegsel was home to 238 people in 1840. The Catholic Monulphus and Gondulphus was built in 1926, and was a low wide tower. Knegsel used to be part of the municipality Vessem, Wintelre en Knegsel. In 1996, it was merged into Eersel.

== Gallery ==
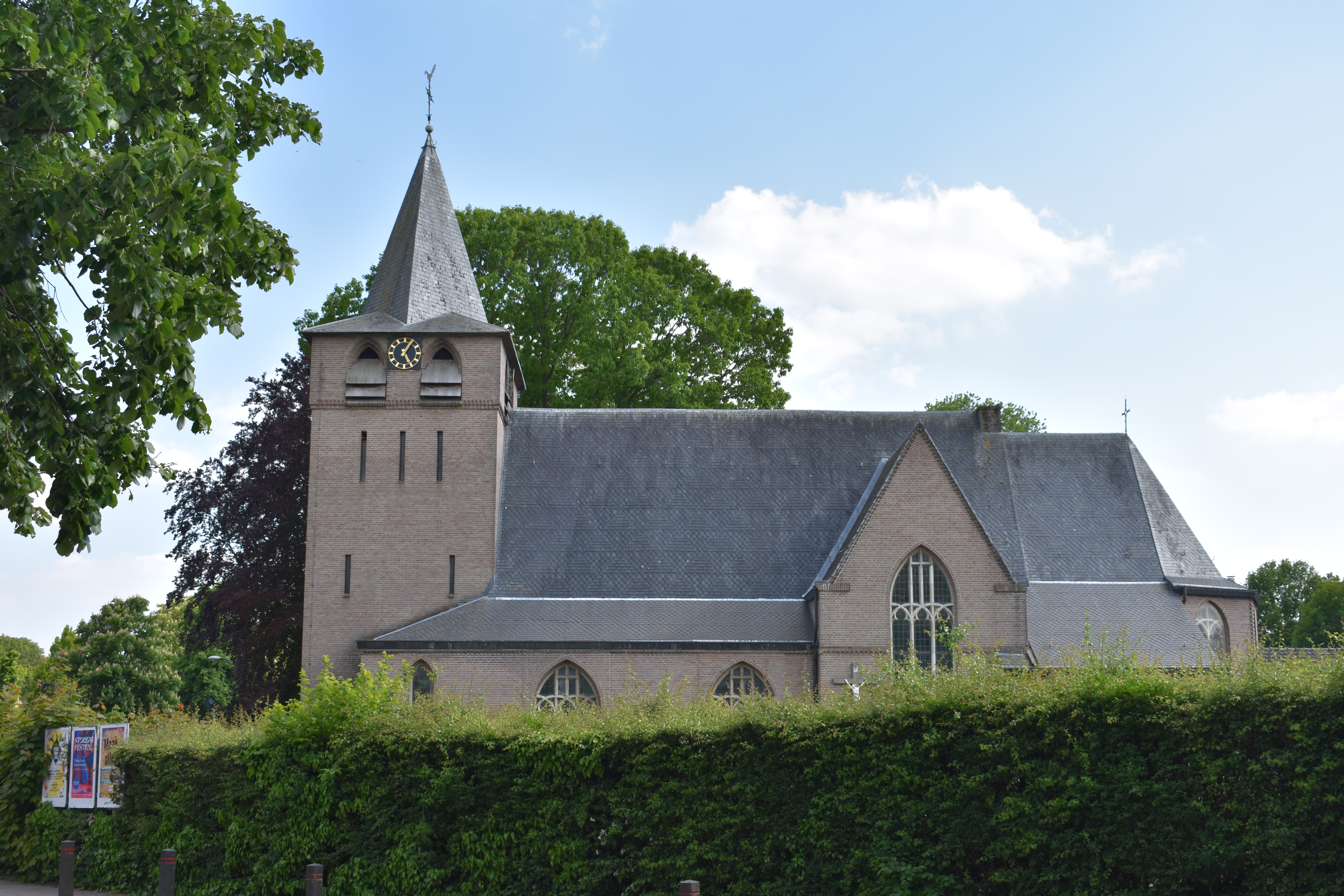
Monulphus and Gondulphus Church

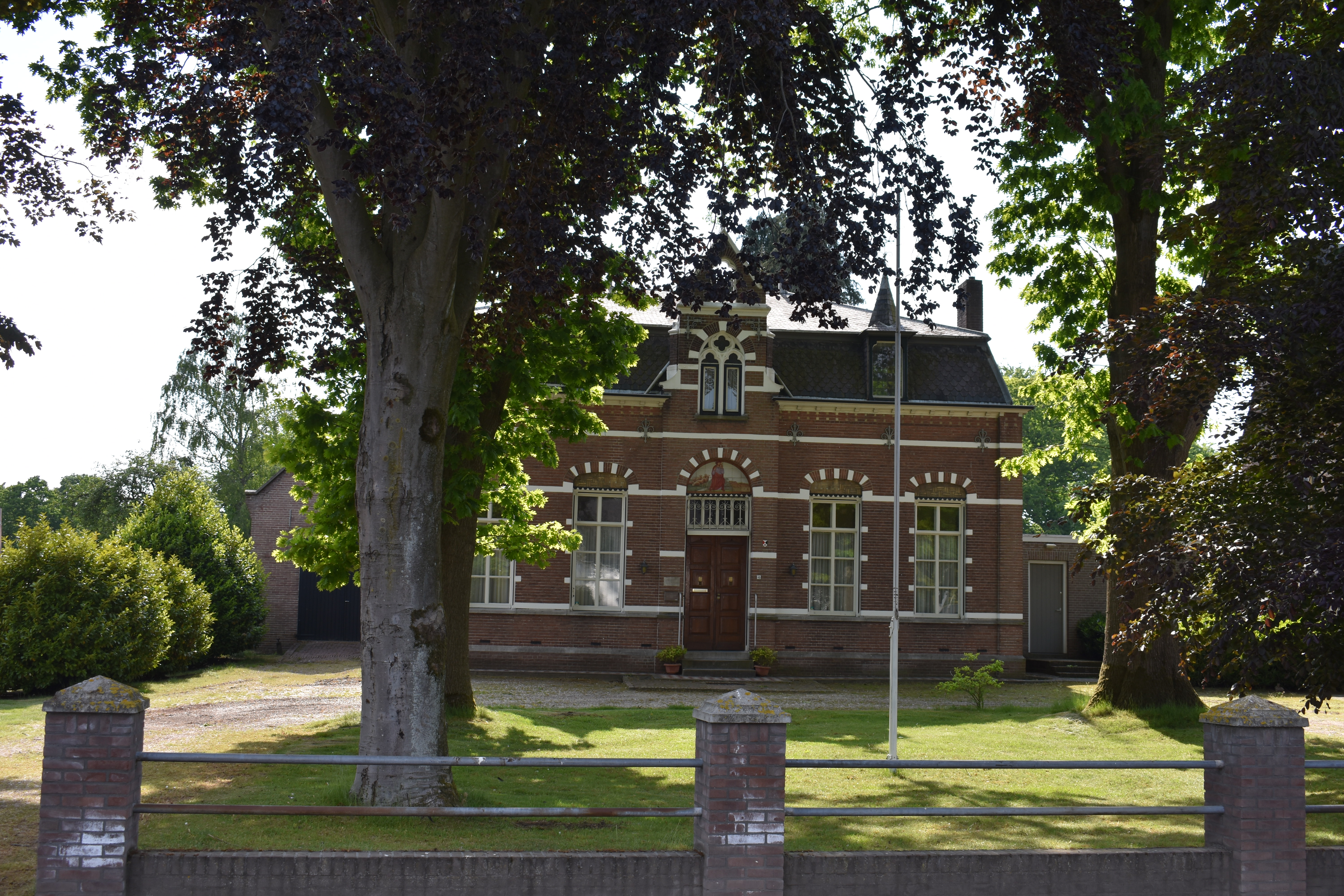
Former clergy house
