= Vessem =

Coordinates: 51°25′12″N 5°17′18″E

- Village
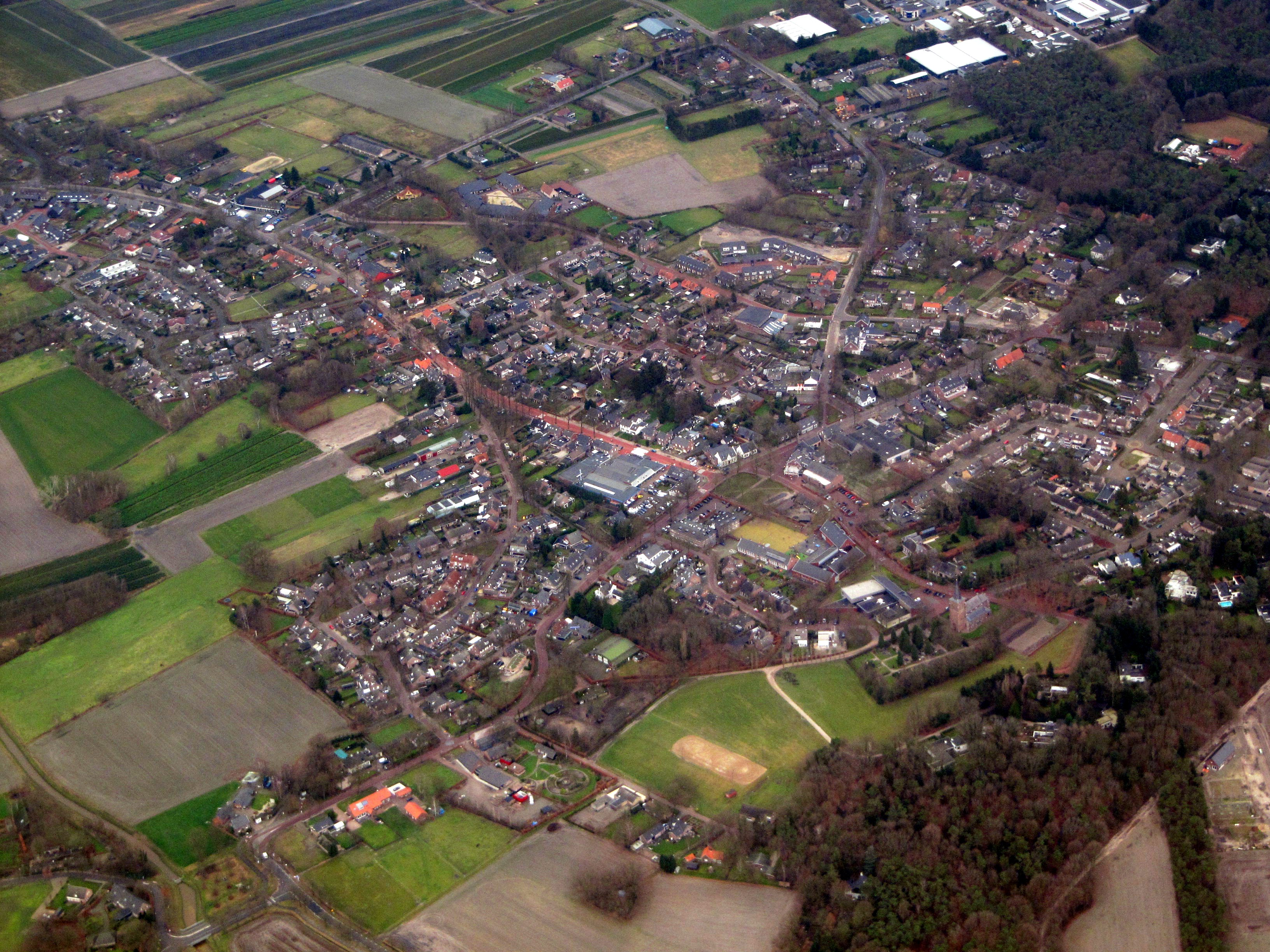
- Aerial photograph of Vessem

- Location in the province of North Brabant in the Netherlands Vessem (Netherlands)
- Country: Netherlands
- Province: North Brabant
- Municipality: Eersel

Area
  - Total: 18.44 km^{2} (7.12 sq mi)
- Elevation: 27 m (89 ft)

Population (2021)
  - Total: 2,155
  - Density: 116.9/km^{2} (302.7/sq mi)
- Time zone: UTC+1 (CET)
  - Summer (DST): UTC+2 (CEST)
- Postal code: 5512
- Dialing code: 0497

Vessem is a village in the southern Netherlands. It is located in the municipality of Eersel, North Brabant. Cultural attractions include the Jacobusmolen windmill and several galleries.

The village was first mentioned in 1245 as Veseme. The etymology is unclear. Vessem is a church village which developed on a sandy ridge along the Kleine Beerze.

Vessem was home to 581 people in 1840. It used to part of the municipality of Vessem, Wintelre en Knegsel until 1996 when it was merged into Eersel.

== Sights ==
- Old Town Hall from 1898 with a memorial stone commemorating the inauguration of Queen Wilhelmina in the same year. It is a symmetrical white building with a stepped gable.
- The family-owned brewery 'De Leeuw' is redbrick factory building with a tall chimney dominating the central street. The brewery now produces Beerze beer. The premises burnt down in 1904 but was rebuilt in 1905. It was restored again in 2008, expanding to include a restaurant, hotel accommodation, meeting rooms, and a courtyard garden. It now regularly hosts weddings.
- The Catholic St. Lambertus Church was a 15th-century tower, and the church was added between 1882 and 1883.
- The grist mill Jacobus was built in 1893. It was restored in 1969 and 1986. The wind mill is technically operational, however a large beech tree prevents the wheel from turning.

== Gallery ==
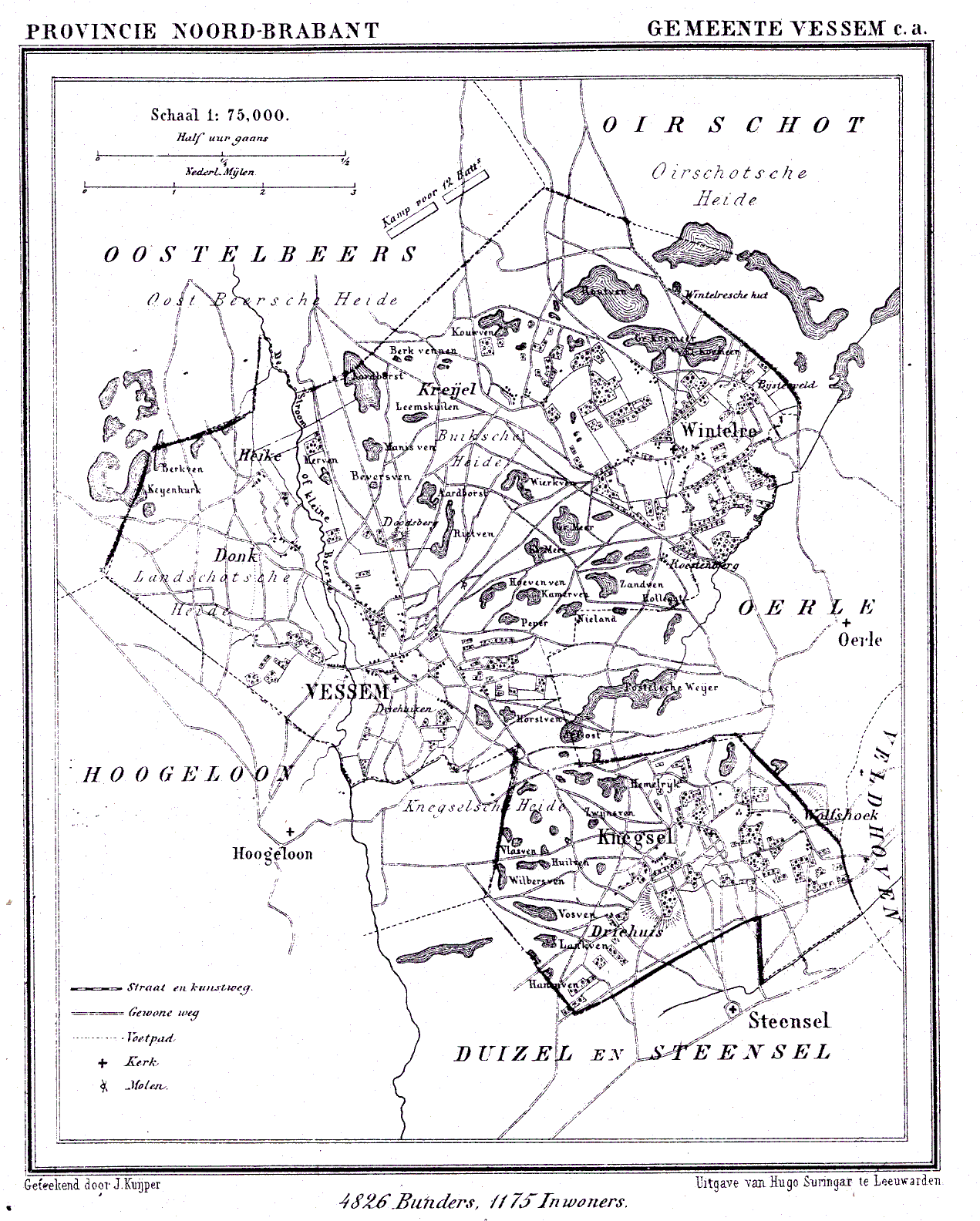
Vessem in 1867

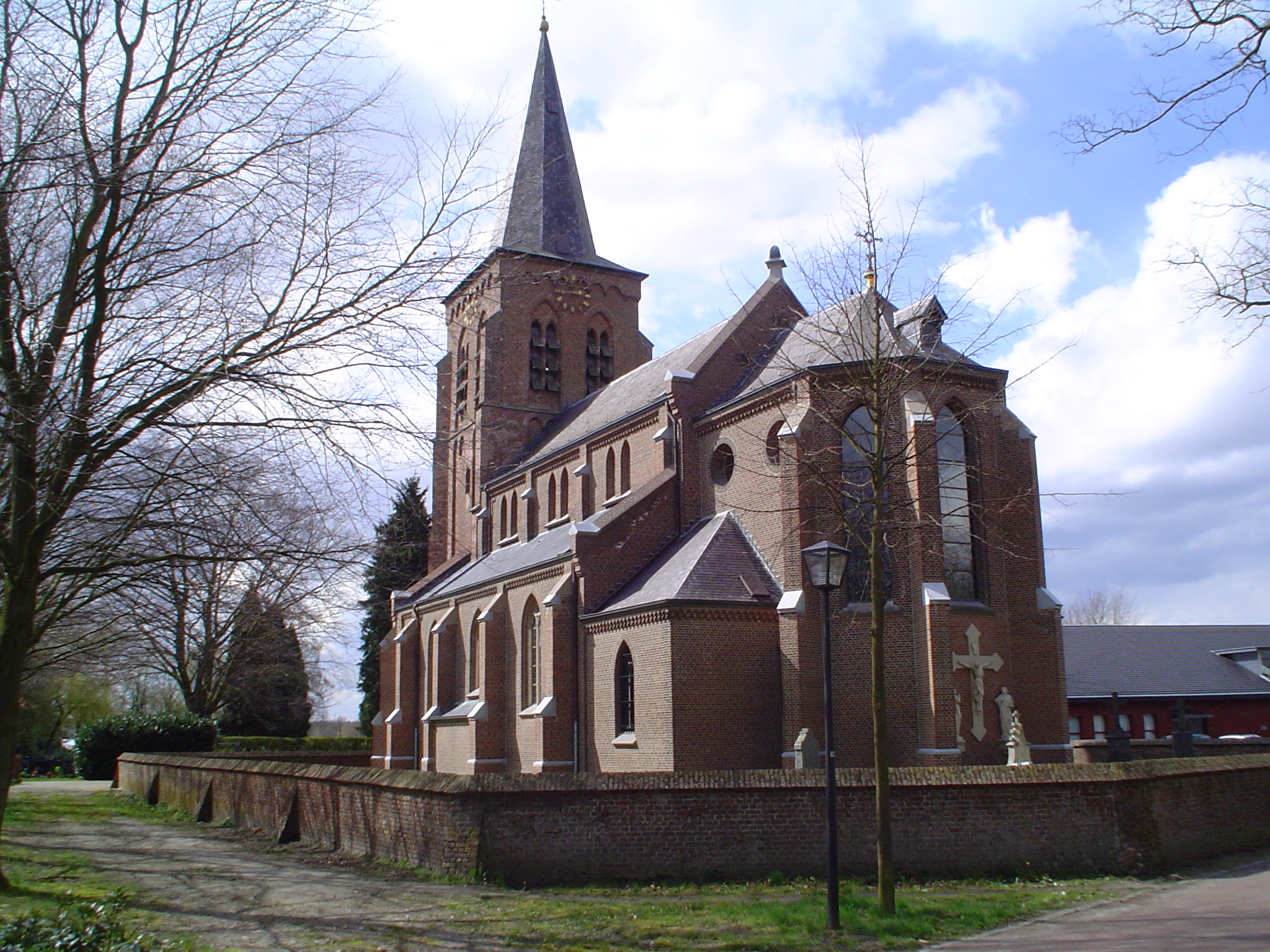
St Lambertus Church

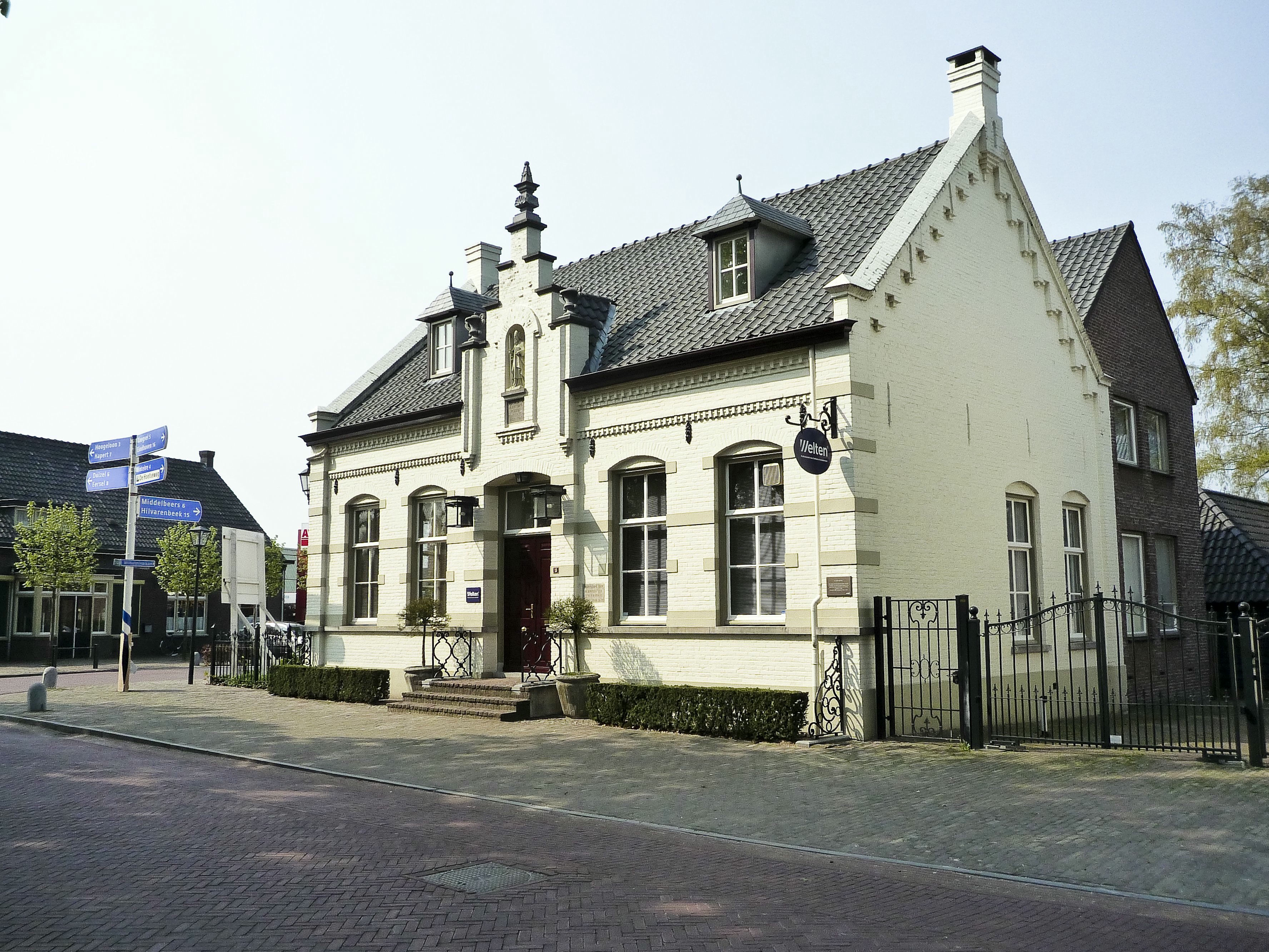
Former town hall

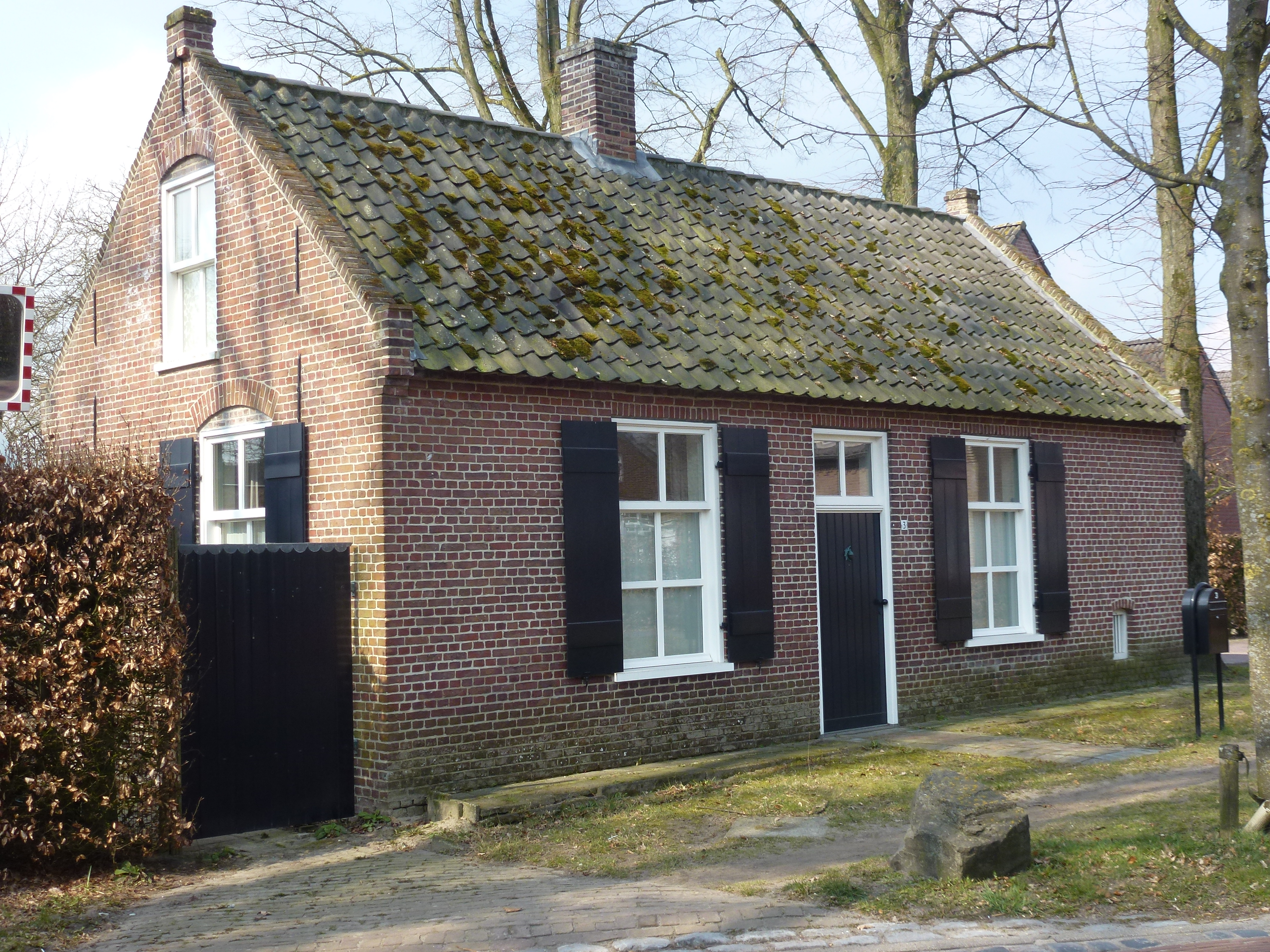
House in Vessem
