= Texandria =

Ancient and Medieval region of the Netherlands and Belgium

Texandria (also Toxiandria; later Toxandria, Taxandria) (Note: Bijsterveld & Toorians 2018, p. 41: "It was only later that antiquarians started to use Texandria again or, more often, the later variants Taxandria or Toxandria, to denote Kempenland or the Kempen region, which today straddles the Dutch-Belgian border.") is a region mentioned in the 4th century AD and during the Middle Ages. It was situated in the southern part of the modern Netherlands and in the northern part of present-day Belgium, an area currently known as Campine (Kempen in Dutch).

== Name ==
The tribal name Texandri, which may be related to the name of the region, is mentioned as Texand(ri) by an inscription dated 100–225 AD, as Texuandri by Pliny (1st c. AD), and perhaps as Texu<...> on an inscription from Romania dated 102–103 AD.

The variant form Toxiandria is only attested once in a 9th-century manuscript of Ammianus Marcellinus' Res Gestae (ca. 390) to designate the region, and the variant Taxandria occurs five times in 9th-century sources, and also in later documents. The inconsistencies in spelling may be explained by dittography (errors by copyists), or by the fact that the older form Texandria had fallen out of usage.

The name Texandria is generally assumed to derive from the Proto-Germanic stem *tehswō(n)- ('right [hand], south'; cf. Old Saxon tesewa, Gothic taihswa, 'right, south') attached to the contrasting suffix *-dra-. Texandria may thus be interpreted as the 'land of the southerners'.

== History ==
The region of Texandria is first mentioned by the Roman historian Ammianus Marcellinus ca. 390 AD. In the 380s, the Salian Franks, after being defeated by Julian ca. 358, were given permission to settle apud Toxiandriam locum ('at a place in Toxiandria').

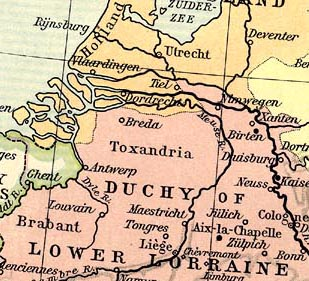
Texandria in a map of Western Europe 919–1125.

Between 709 and ca. 1100, the name Texandria was used to designate an area in the modern region of Campine, straddling southern Netherlands and northern Belgium. In sources of the period 709–795, the pagus Texandrie appears concentrated in the basin of the river Dommel and its tributaries, with a first cluster of settlement between Alphen in the west and Waalre in the east, and a second cluster to the south around Overpelt.

As a result of a growing elite network of alliances, Texandria expanded between 815 and 914 to a region covering modern North Brabant and adjacent parts of the provinces of Antwerp and Limburg (possibly between Oosterhout, Laakdal and Reppel). In the mid-11th century, Stepelinus, a monk from Saint-Trond, located the region of Campania (firstly attested in this document) within Texandria. From ca. 1225, Campania (modern Campine) replaced Texandria as the name of the region. The latter had nonetheless survived as the name of a vast archdeaconry within the diocese of Liège, although it was eventually also replaced with Campania by the end of the 14th century, then disappeared from historical records. (Note: Bijsterveld & Toorians 2018, p. 41: "The name Texandria temporarily lived on as the name of a vast archdeaconry within the diocese of Liège, although this name was replaced by Campinia by the end of the fourteenth century. By then, the duke of Brabant ruled there, after he had made his way north and gradually expanded his properties and power across the present-day provinces of Antwerp and North Brabant in the second half of the twelfth and the first decades of the thirteenth centuries. The ducal administration never used the name Texandria but, from about 1225, referred to Campinia or Kempinia instead, perhaps because Texandria was associated too much with the bishop of Liège, the duke’s hereditary enemy. This meant that this name eventually disappeared from the record.")
