= Wintelre =

Wintelre Wintersel
- Village
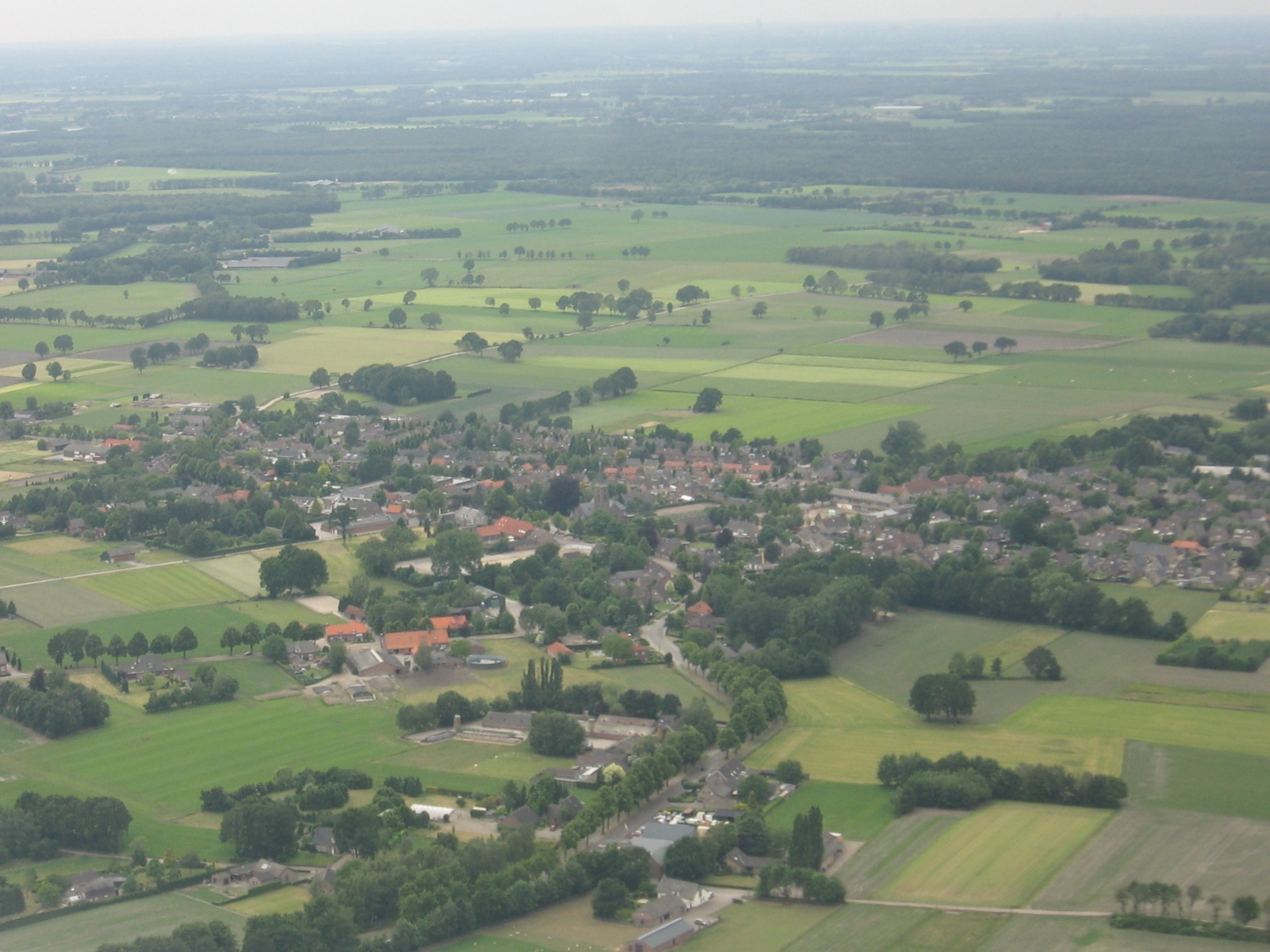
- Aerial view

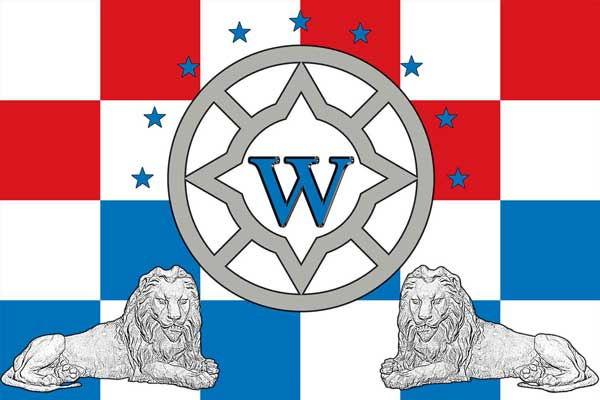
- Flag

- Location in the province of North Brabant in the Netherlands Wintelre (Netherlands)
- Coordinates: 51°27′N 5°20′E
- Country: Netherlands
- Province: North Brabant
- Municipality: Eersel

Area
  - Total: 17.41 km^{2} (6.72 sq mi)
- Elevation: 23 m (75 ft)

Population (2021)
  - Total: 2,030
  - Density: 117/km^{2} (302/sq mi)
- Time zone: UTC+1 (CET)
  - Summer (DST): UTC+2 (CEST)
- Postal code: 5513
- Dialing code: 040

Wintelre is a village in the municipality of Eersel in the province of North Brabant, the Netherlands. Wintelre is part of the Acht Zaligheden (Eight Beatitudes), like Eersel, Duizel, Steensel, Knegsel, Netersel, Hulsel and Reusel.

The village was first mentioned in the 13th century as Winterlo. The etymology is unclear.

In 1320, a Mary chapel was built in Wintelre. In 1570, it was replaced by a church, but was turned over to the Dutch Reformed Church in 1648, and started to decay due to the small size of the Protestant congregation. In 1822, a new Catholic church was built. A tower was added between 1857 and 1859. Between 1930 and 1931, a new church was built next to the old one. The old church was later demolished, but its tower remained.

Wintelre was home to 435 people in 1840.

== Gallery ==
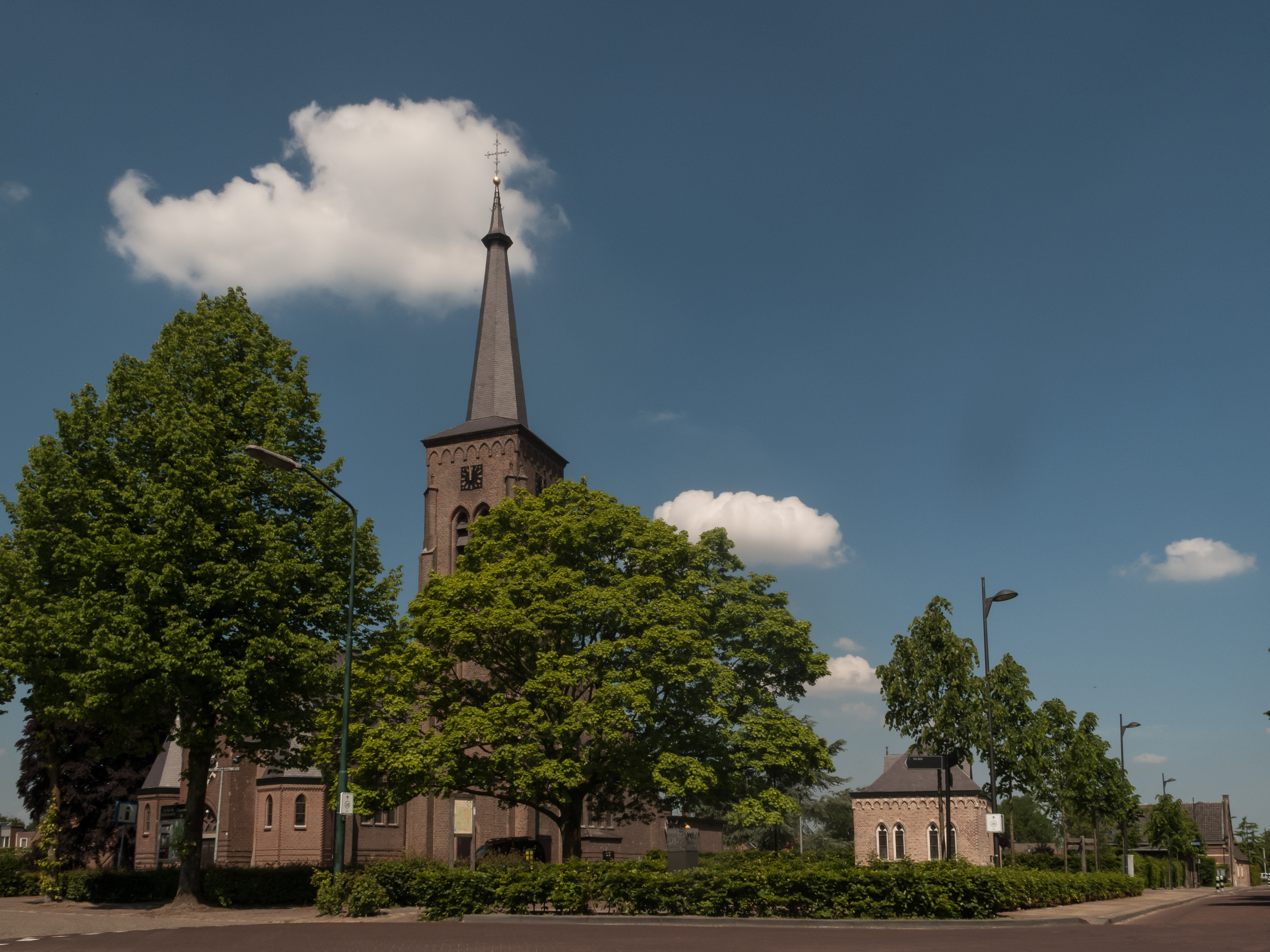
Wintelre, church: the Sint Willibrorduskerk

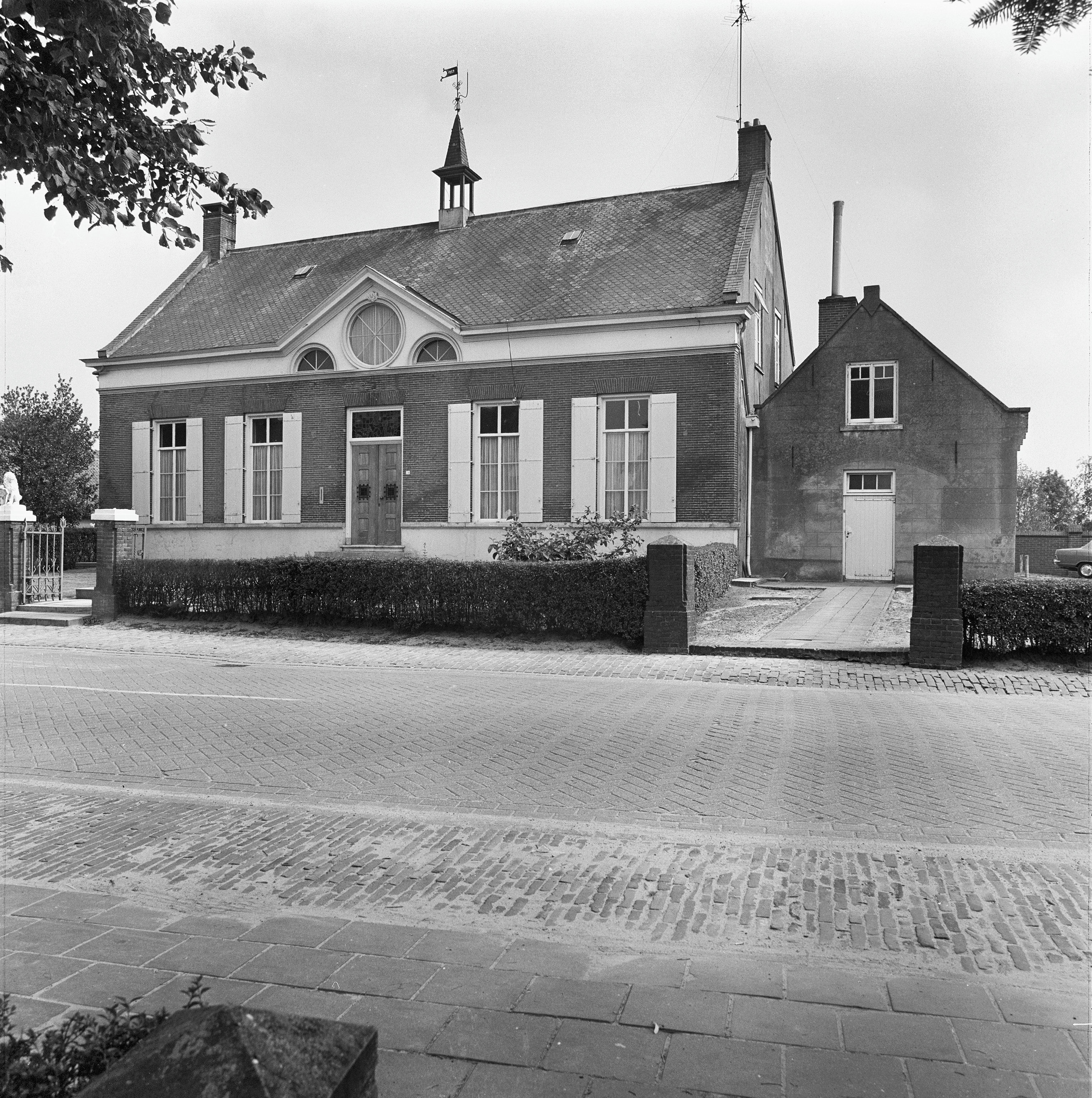
Clergy house

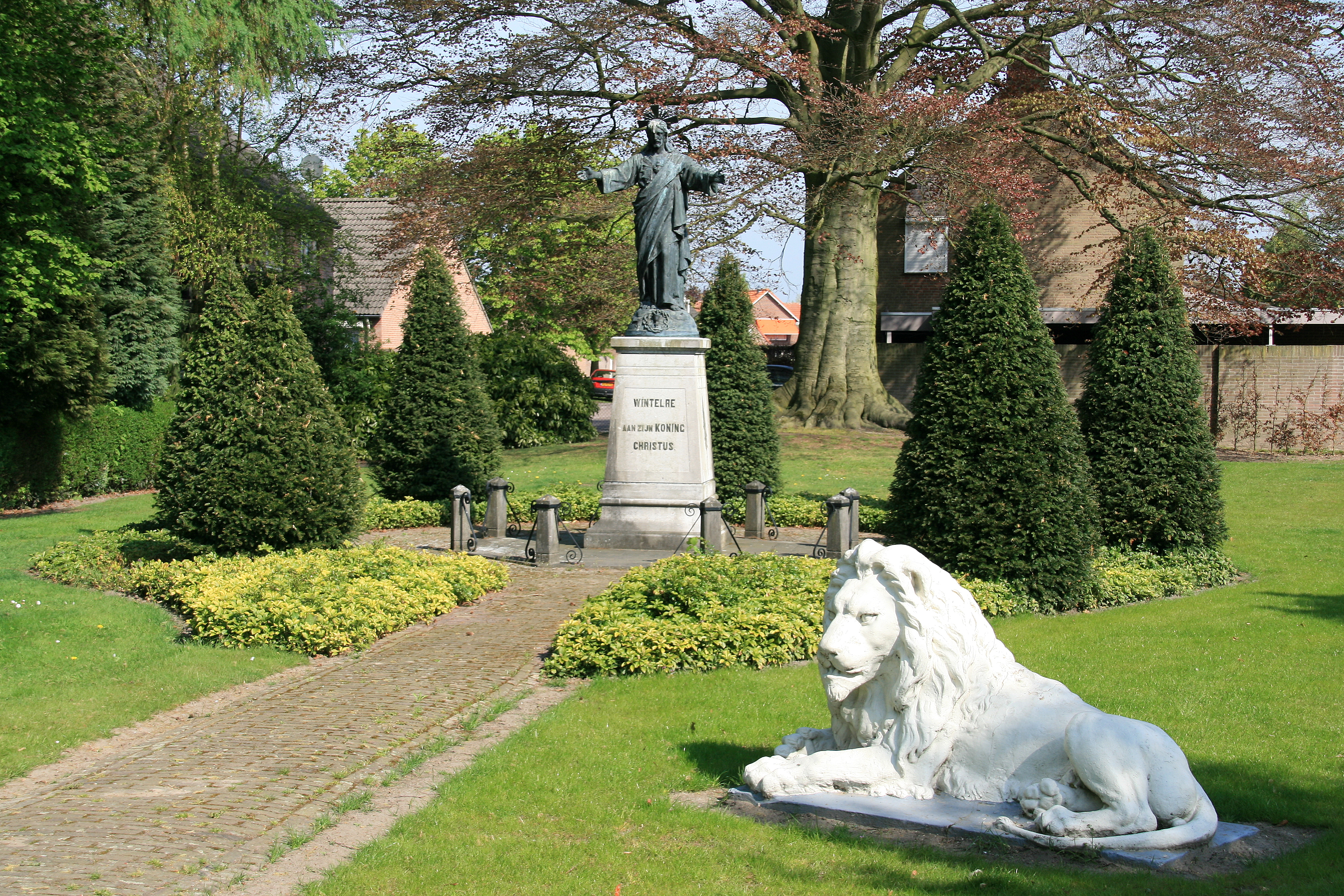
Sacred Heart statue with lion
