= Dommelbeemden =

Coordinates: 51.5486°N 5.4983°E

The Dommelbeemden are, along with the Moerkuilen a forestry area in a bend of the Dommel river northeast of Nijnsel in Meierijstad. It is located at the Lieshoutse Dijk, not far from the A50 motorway. The protected area measures over 100 acres. The Dommelbeemden are part of the larger area Het Groene Woud.

This diverse area was designated as a natural monument in 1977. The most original part and natural state of the Dommel can be found between Eindhoven and Boxtel and hence in the Dommelbeemden. Here the Dommel has still its original winds and meanders and forms a cultural-historical and valuable landscape area.

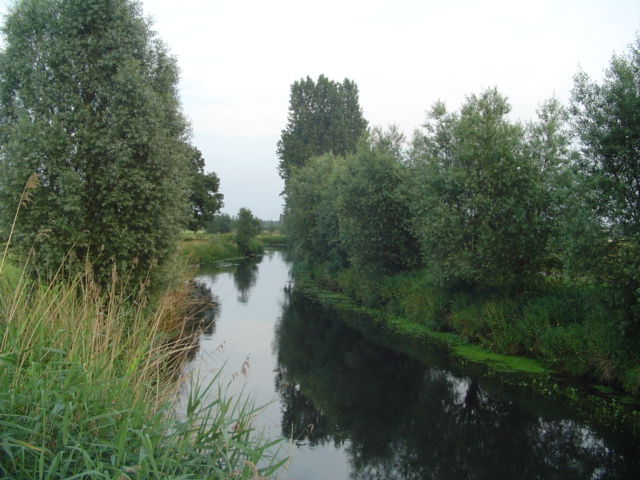
Dommel in the Dommelbeemden in Nijnsel

The Dommelbeemden consist of species-poor meadows with willows and include rattles and orchids. There are wet meadows in which rare plants such as Marsh Lousewort can be found. A clogging old meander of the Dommel there is filled with water lilies. At a higher elevation, which is part of the Central Brabant Sand Ridge, there are traditional "bolakkers" (high fields). The meadows are the low-lying grasslands directly along the Dommel. Through regular flooding these grounds were once only suitable as a hayfield. This hay was important because it served as winter feed for livestock. Originally, this landscape was interspersed with carrs and coppice hedges. On the upper parts of the river valley, there are bolakkers (high fields) where mainly cereals were cultivated. The area is known to have rare plants and animals.

In the southeast the area connects with the Vresselse Bossen.

The current management is aiming to restore the old landscape of the area as much as possible. The meadows are extensive grazed and Staatsbosbeheer replanted hedges and knotted willows.
