= Moerkuilen =

Coordinates: 51.5631°N 5.4983°E

The Moerkuilen are, along with the Dommelbeemden a forestry area in a bend of the Dommel river north east of Nijnsel in Meierijstad. It is located at the Lieshoutse Dijk, not far from the A50 motorway. The protected area measures over 100 acres and connects with the Vresselse Bossen (Vresselsh Forests) in the south. The Moerkuilen are part of the larger area Het Groene Woud.

The lake in a lowland peat soil, was created by the dredging of Moer, which is quagmire consisting of decayed plant material that could be used as peat (fuel) after drying. The Moerkuilen borders the Dommelbeemden. It is a moore lake in the Dommel valley, and is known for water lilies, potamogeton, calla and carex species. Around the fish-rich peat lake, which attracts many birds, is a swamp forest (carr) bordered by forestry river dunes. There is a varied flora including common cow wheat and may lily.

The river Dommel streamed past it over a higher plateau. Because of this there remains a striking steep edge.

There are different trails through the terrain. There is a 4.5 km long marked trail. At the road "Lieshoutse Dijk" is a car park with an information board on the flora and fauna.

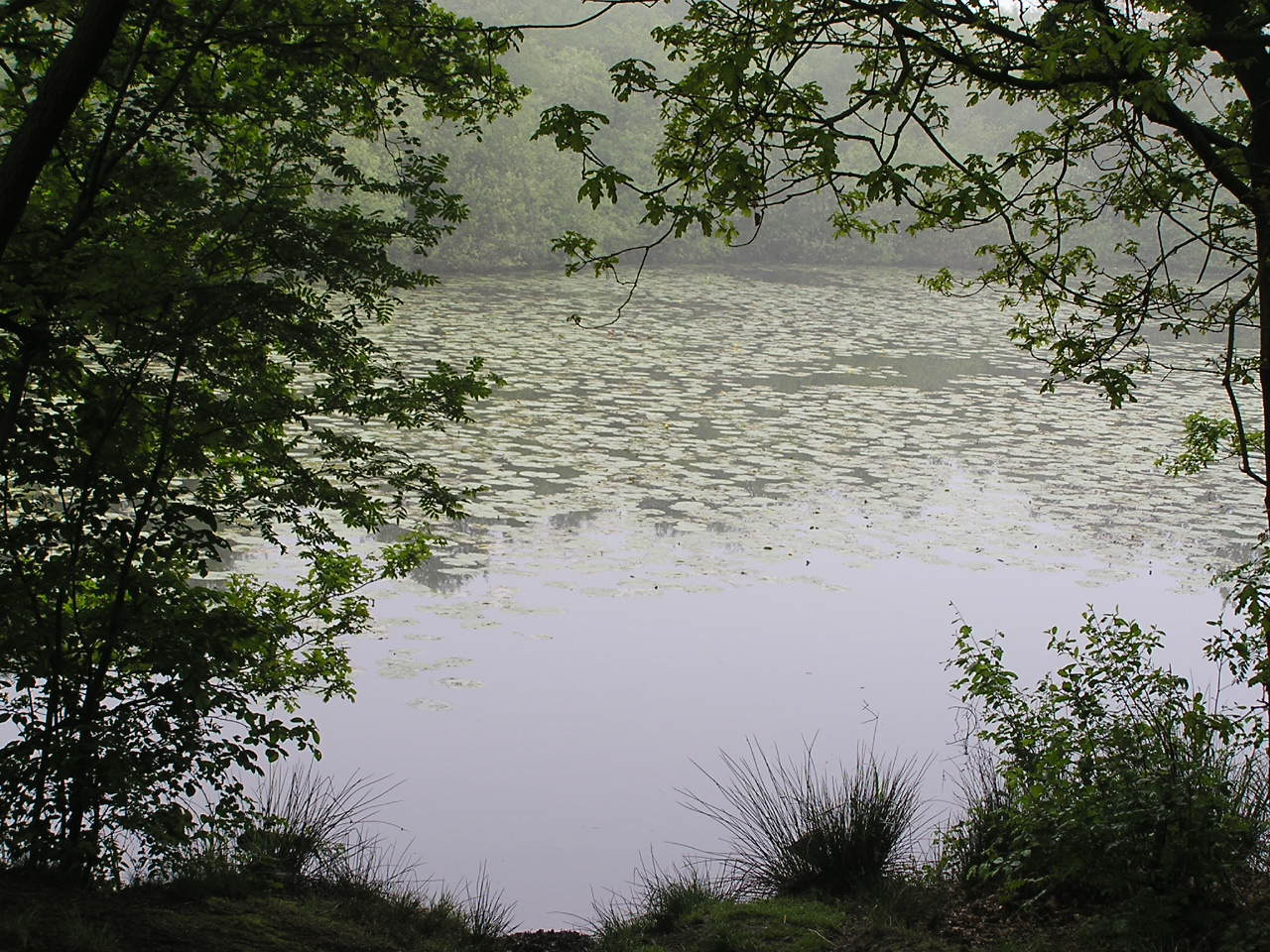
De Moerkuilen
