= Nijnsel =

- Village
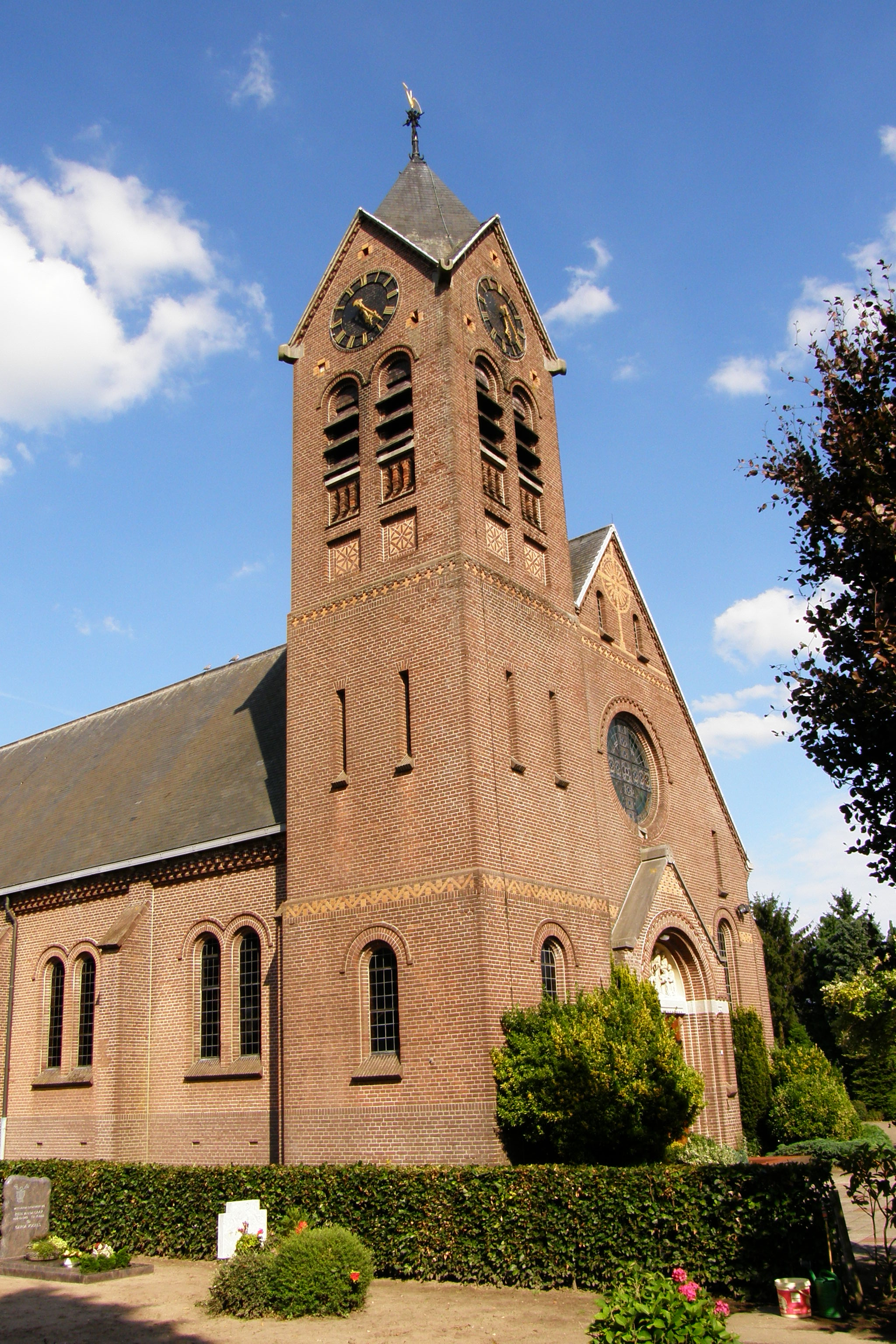
- Sint Antonius of Padua Church

- Location in the province of North Brabant in the Netherlands Nijnsel (Netherlands)
- Coordinates: 51°33′5″N 5°29′1″E
- Country: Netherlands
- Province: North Brabant
- Municipality: Meierijstad

Area
  - Total: 3.91 km^{2} (1.51 sq mi)
- Elevation: 12 m (39 ft)

Population (2021)
  - Total: 1,730
  - Density: 442/km^{2} (1,150/sq mi)
- Time zone: UTC+1 (CET)
  - Summer (DST): UTC+2 (CEST)
- Postal code: 5492
- Dialing code: 0492

Nijnsel (North Meierijs dialect: Nènzûl ) is a village in the province of North Brabant, the Netherlands, located in the Meierij of 's-Hertogenbosch. Nijnsel is a parish of the municipality of Meierijstad.

== Etymology ==
The word Nijnsel means new residence ("nij" mening new, "sel" meaning residence). The name of the nearby hamlet Vressel means Old residence. "Sel" being derived from the word "sale", which refers to the largest house in the area which belonged to the local nobleman in the early medieval period.

== History ==
The hamlets Nijnsel and Vressel on either side of the Dommel river are known to be habituated in prehistoric times. There are archaeological remains of the Bell Beaker culture and also remains of the Roman era were found. There are numerous archaeological monuments which also remain from the Mesolithic era. A settlement from the early Bronze Age, around 1500 BC was excavated in Nijnsel.

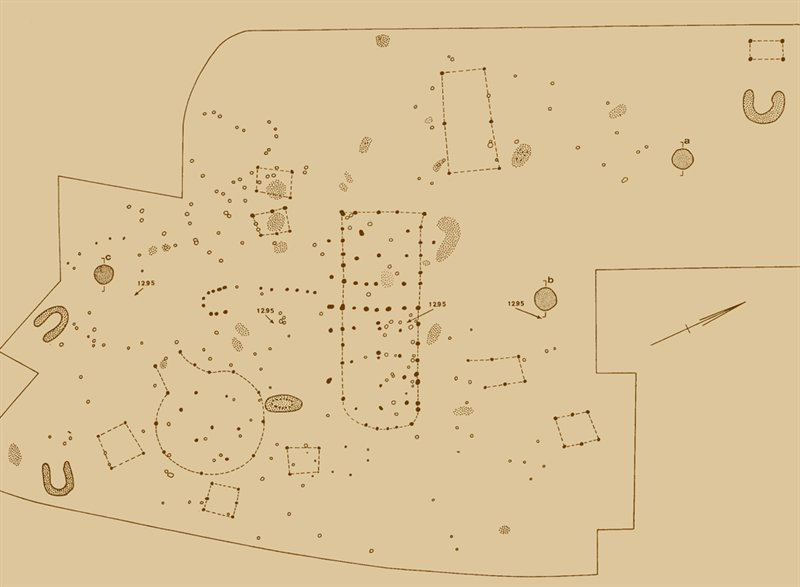
A map of the excavation of a settlement from the early Bronze Age, around 1500 BC Just north of the fen De Hazenputten in the Vresselse Bossen in Nijnsel. The main building within the excavated portion is a farm of 17 meters by 6 meters. The outer wall consisted of poles that were connected with braid and were covered with clay. The posts within the farm will have borne the roof. A series of heavy poles on the south side of the farm probably supported a far extended roof on that side that was necessary in view of the down pouring rain that could wash away the clay there. In the long walls of the farmhouse opposite to each other there are two wide entrances forming a corridor which divided the building into a living area and a shed or barn. Around the farm there were numerous outbuildings. The most notable was a circular building that was probably a sheepfold. The other buildings are square or rectangular sheds and called "Spiekers": constructions of four or six poles with a raised floor for the storage of grain and hay. Northwest of the main building was a large barn of 7 by 3.5 meters. The many other posts will have served a variety of small buildings that belong to a farm like racks, an apiary, doghouse etc. The dark spots on the map were pits which were probably used for manure or the storing of winter silage.

Nijnsel originated as a settlement around a chapel which was dedicated to Anthony the Great and was already mentioned in the 15th century. The village traditionally belonged to the ancient vrijheerlijkheid of Sint-Oedenrode and was just as nearby Vressel a hamlet. After the Peace of Münster in 1648, the chapel was closed. The Catholic population used now a clandestine church in a barn in Sint-Oedenrode, while the empty chapel was used as a Protestant school since 1731, after the hamlets Nijnsel and Vressel sent a petition to establish their own school in 1728 to the Council of State of the Netherlands in The Hague. In 1892 the chapel was demolished.

The village Nijnsel includes the possible remains of castle Ten Houte, which is founded in the 15th century and demolished in the 19th century. These remains are located between the Houtsestraat and the Hoogstraat.

Nijnsel continued into the twentieth century as a small linear settlement on the old road between Sint-Oedenrode and Lieshout. Later on the development of the village was further determined by both the construction of the Catholic Church, and by the proximity to the Veghelseweg - Sonseweg (Road to Veghel and to Son). The "Sint Antonius van Padua" Church was inaugurated in 1911 and around the church formed a village. The largest change over the last decades was the arrival of a new neighborhood in the 60s-80s and an industrial area in 1970. Initially, only small-scale and 'clean' companies were admitted at the industrial area. Nijnsel was notorious for the Provincial Road N265 which for years separated the village from the nearby Sint-Oedenrode. Since the opening of the State Highway A50 in 2003, the traffic nuisance has diminished, as the A50 since then passes through a tunnel next to the village. The construction of this highway was accompanied by an expansion of the business area.

== Sights ==
- The Saint Anthony of Padua Church is a rustic brick church which was consecrated in 1911 and designed by the architect Louis Kooken from Eindhoven. The choice of Anthony of Padua as the patron saint of the church arose from the fact that the construction pastor, Johannes Panken, was born on the feast day of this saint. The same priest organized an annual pilgrimage, which was called the Meierijsche Pilgrimage in which thousands of people participated. This pilgrimage began to languish after 1960 and is now long gone. However, an open-air mass is held every year in honor of Anthony of Padua, using a stone niche with canopy in a small park to the rear of the church and the cemetery. This is sometimes called the "green cathedral". Next to the church is a Sacred Heart statue.
- Some characteristic old hall houses in traditional Brabantian style can be found at the provincial road (Lieshoutseweg) to Mariahout and along the Vresselseweg.

== Nature and landscape ==
East and north of Nijnsel runs the river the Dommel through the Dommel valley. On both sides of it there are some old fields. Further west is a heath reclamation: the Rooise Heath. East of the Dommel more nature can be found:

- The Vresselse Bossen (The Vressel's Forests). This area consists of a sand ridge with pine and deciduous forest and covers around 250 hectares (620 acres). It was once a production forest with Scots pine for the Limburgian mines and was built on a drift-sand ridge to stop the sand being blown onto the farmlands, but has become gradually more varied. The forest contains some important fen complexes, of which the Hazenputten is the most important. There are also areas with wet heaths. The area is managed by the National Forestry Service (Staatsbosbeheer). The "Hazenputten" was nominated by Staatsbosbeheer for the title of "Most beautiful spot" in the Netherlands in 2013. There are several hiking trails in this forest, including the famous “geerzingel” path.
- The Moerkuilen. This is an area of pools created by the dredging of Moer, which is quagmire consisting of decayed plant material that could be used as Peat (fuel) after drying. A carr borders these pools. There are hiking trails.
- The Dommelbeemden. This diverse area was designated as a natural monument in 1977. There are wet meadows in which rare plants such as Marsh Lousewort can be found. There is a hiking path and a watchtower has been built.

These three nature areas are located close together and between them some ancient infield can be found, such as small-scale fields. Together these areas form a part of "Het Groene Woud".

- Het Groene Woud. Het Groene Woud (The Green Forest) covers a total of 7,500 hectares (19,000 acres) of marshes, meadows and agricultural landscape between Den Bosch, Eindhoven and Tilburg. The most original part and natural state of the Dommel can be found between Eindhoven and Boxtel and hence in Nijnsel. Here the Dommel has still its original winds and meanders and forms a cultural-historical and valuable landscape area. Hiking, canoeing and cycling activities are possible in this area.
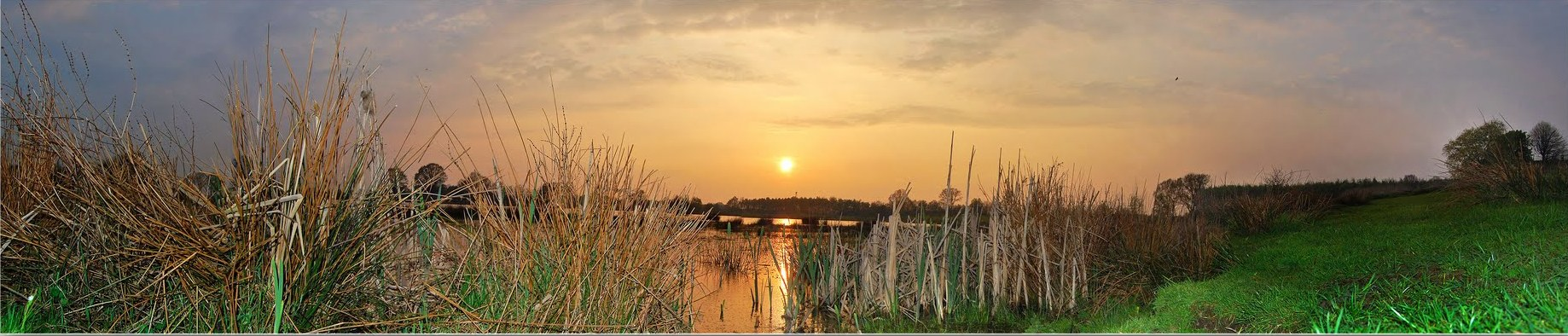
The fen "Hazenputten" in the Vresselse Bossen in Nijnsel

== Trivia ==
- During the yearly carnaval, the name of the village is changed into "Papgat" for three days. Nijnsel has 1 carnaval association named "de Heikneuters".
- Each November the arrival of Sinterklaas in the village is celebrated by a parade for the town's children by the characters involving the holiday.
- The spoken language is North Meierijs (an East Brabantian dialect, which is very similar to colloquial Dutch).

== Nearby residential communities ==
Sint-Oedenrode, Mariahout, Breugel, Son, Boskant, Zijtaart, Veghel, Liempde, Eerde, Wijbosch, Olland and Schijndel.

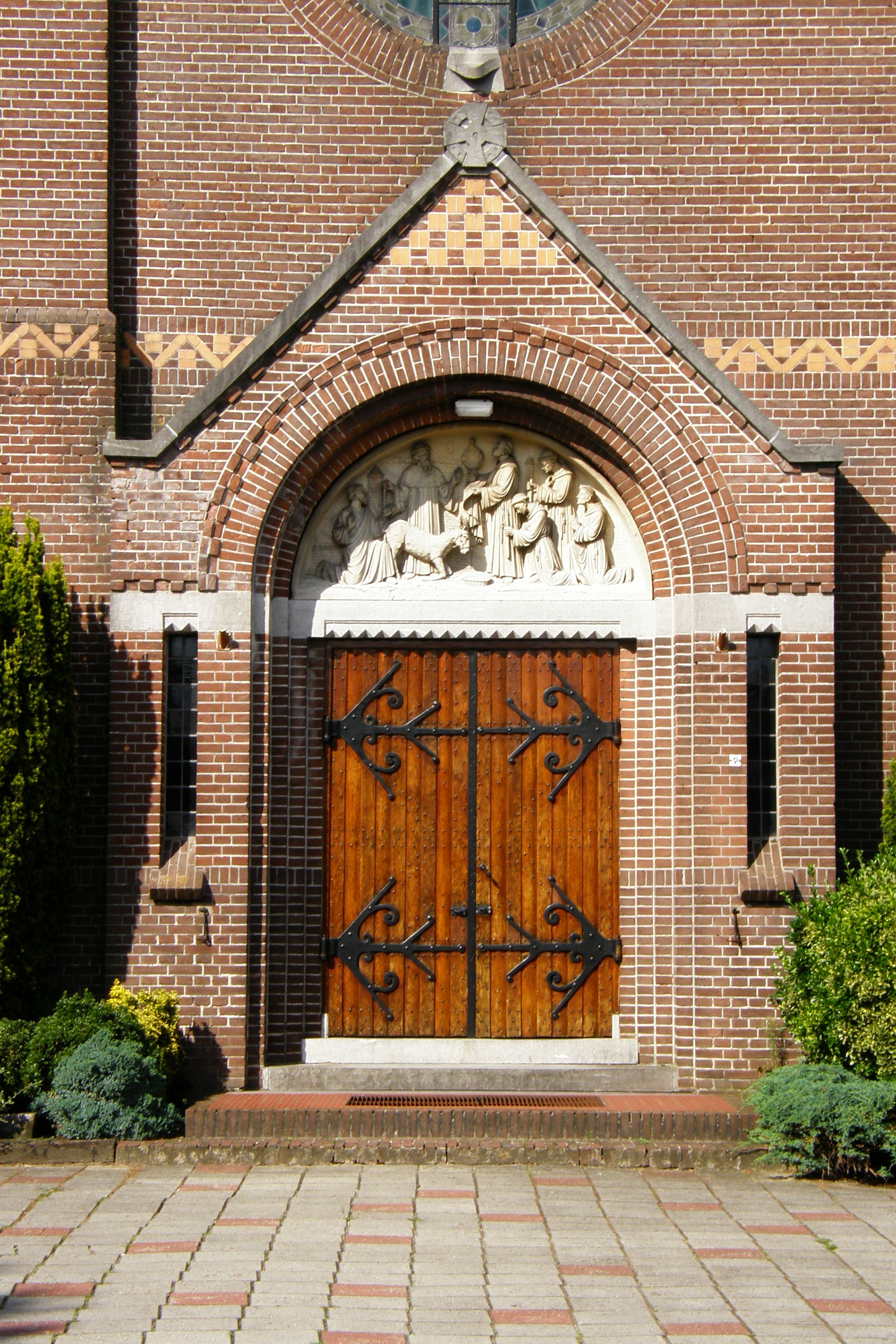
Entrance of Sint Antonius van Padua Church, Nijnsel

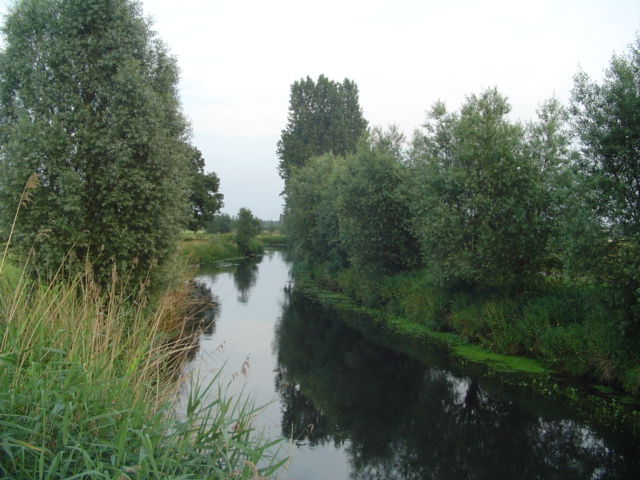
Dommel valley in Nijnsel

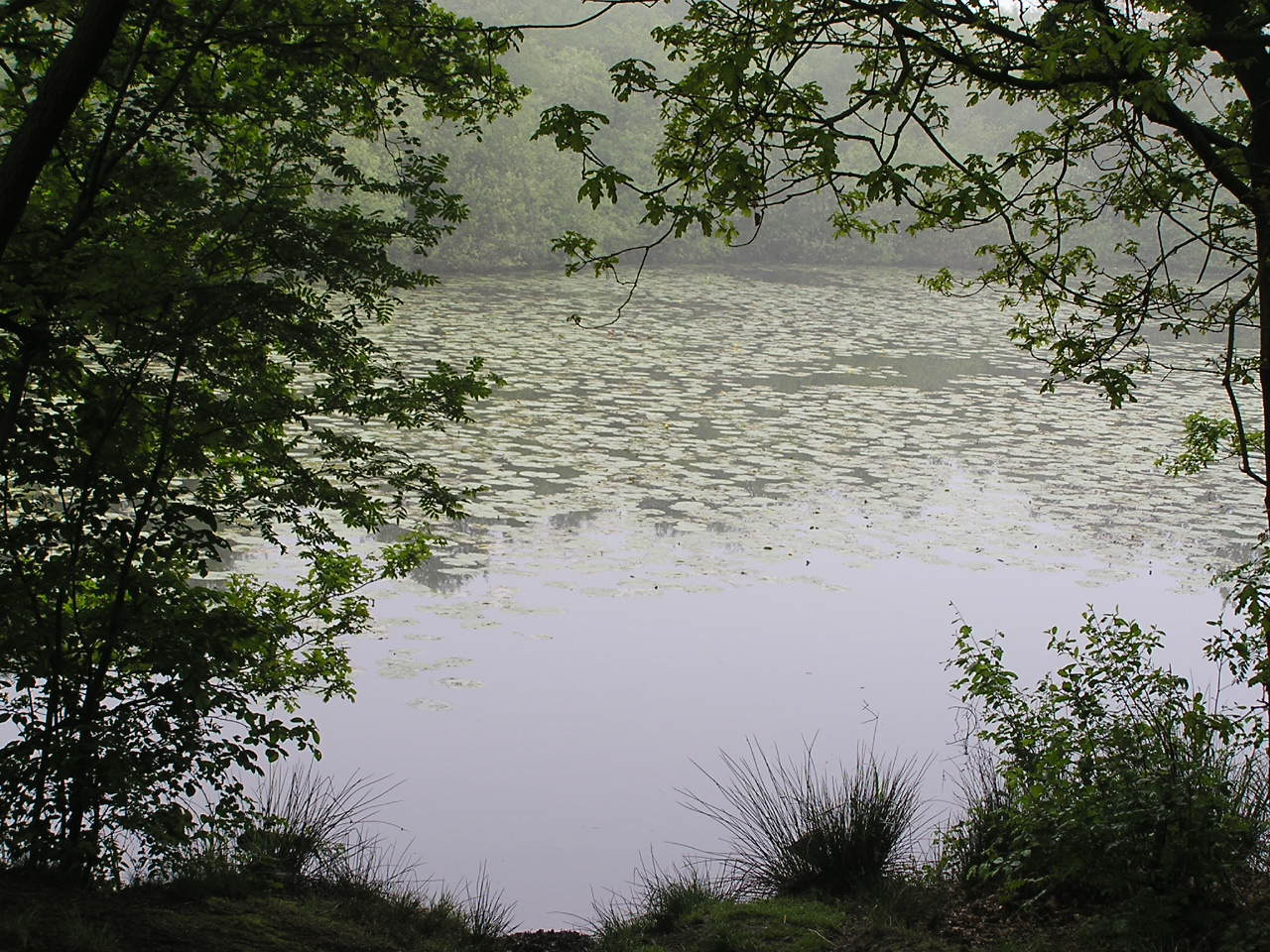
Moerkuilen

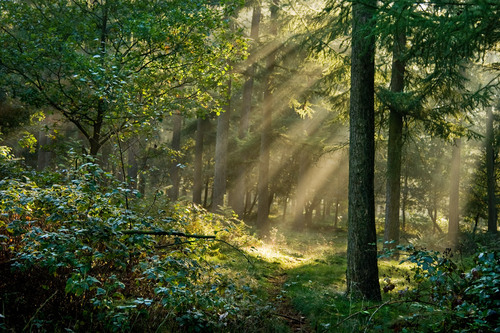
Vressels Forest / Vresselse Bossen

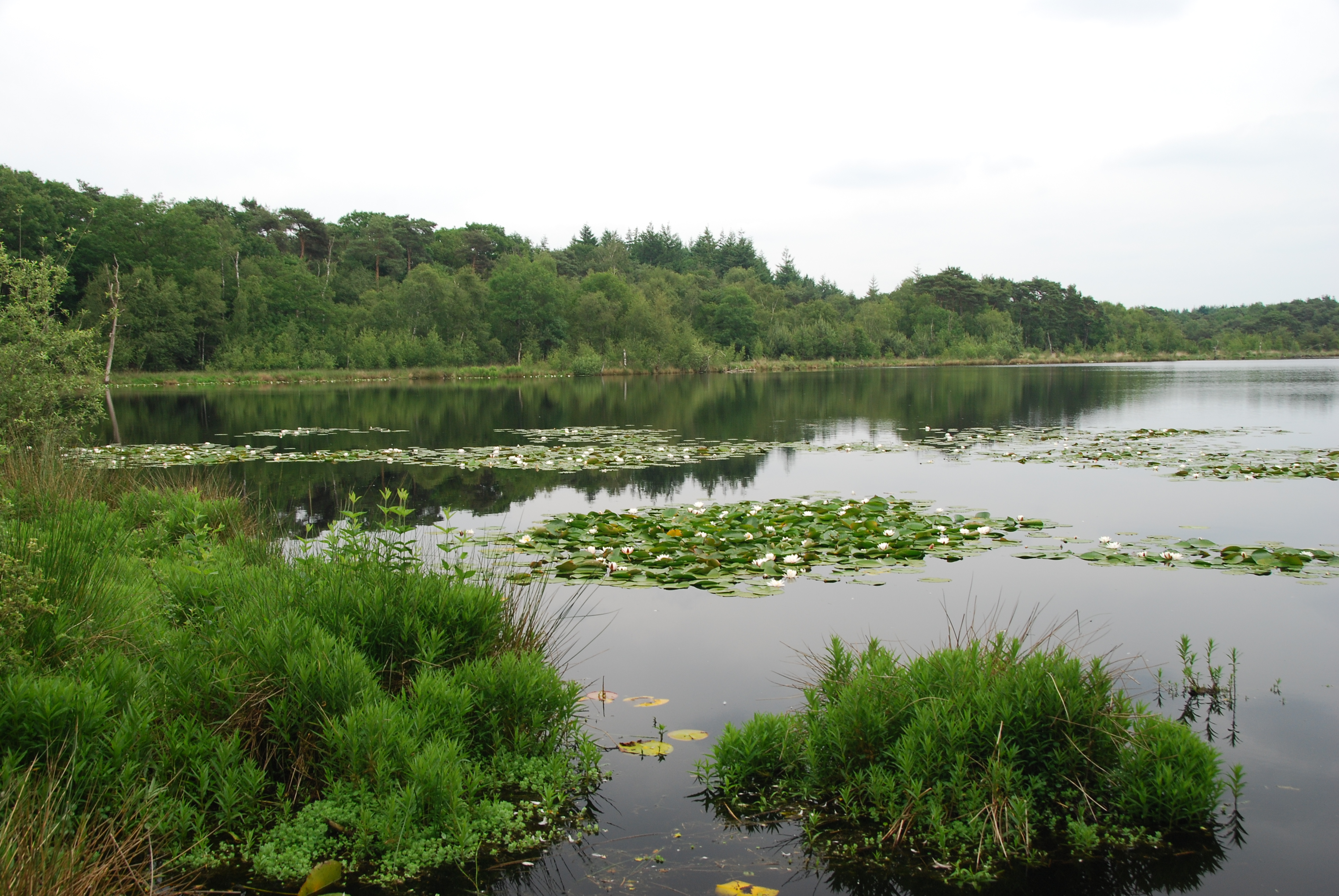
The fen "Hazenputten" in the Vresselse Bossen in Nijnsel

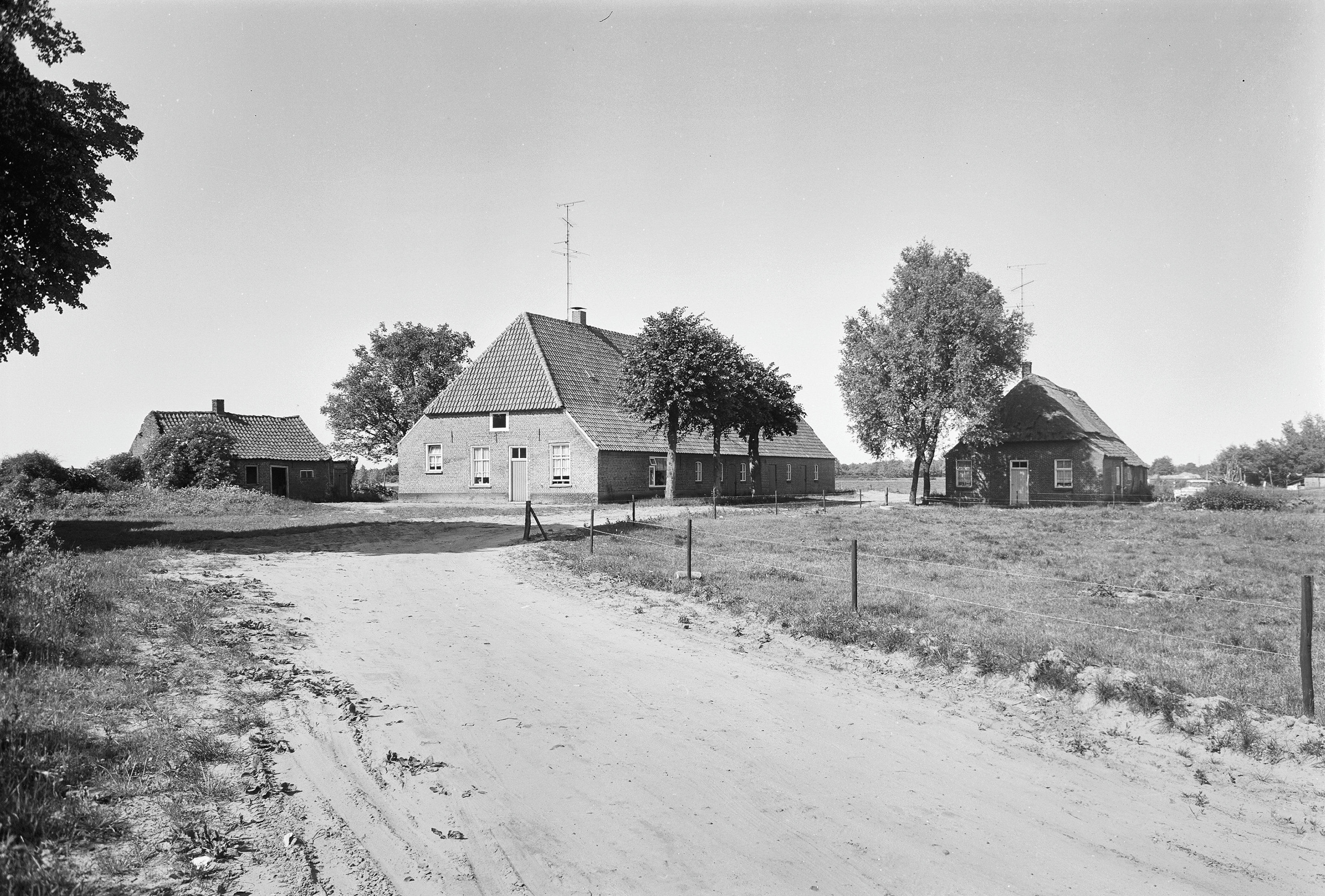
Traditional farm houses, Nijnsel, June 1968

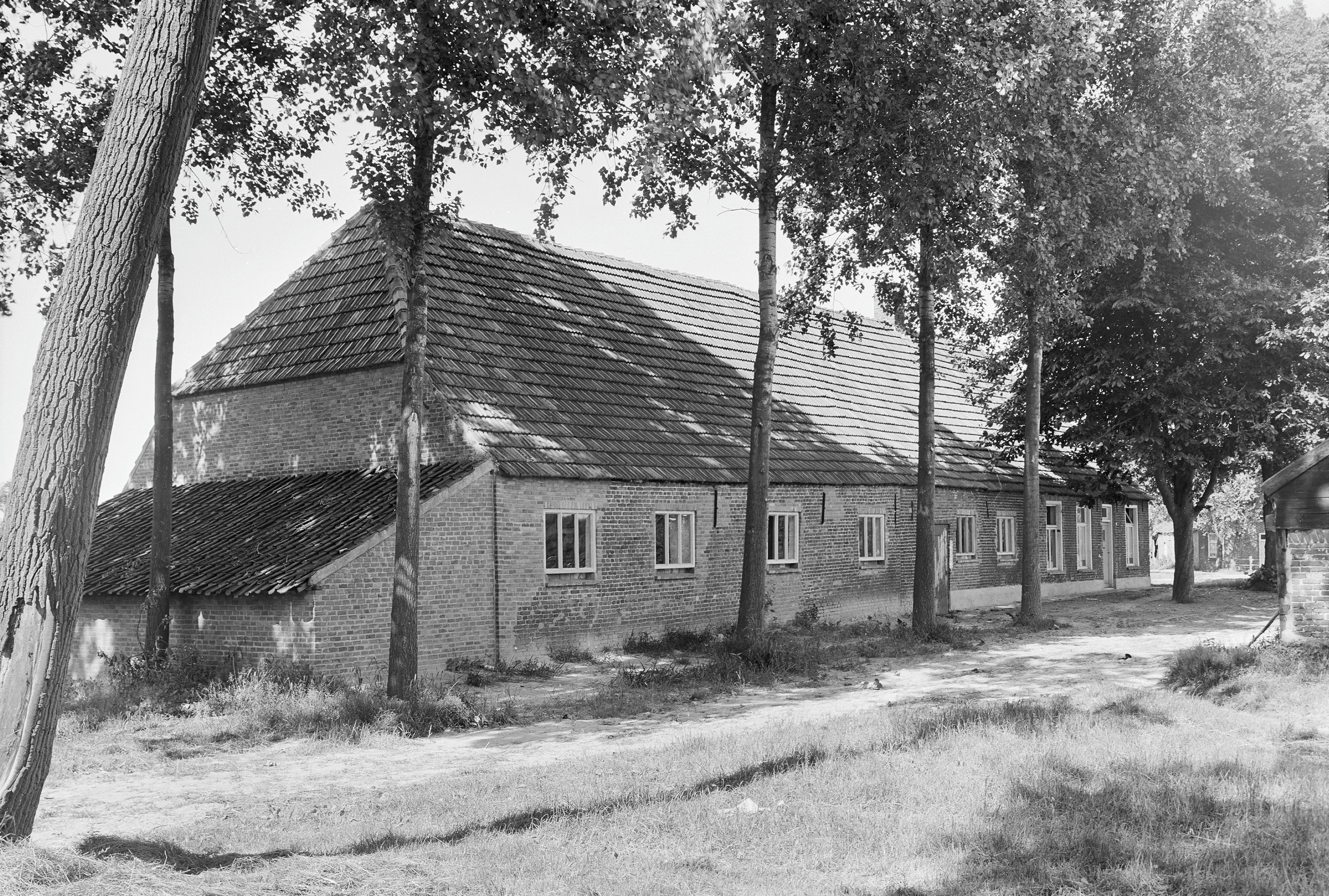
Brabantian Farm house, 1968, Nijnsel

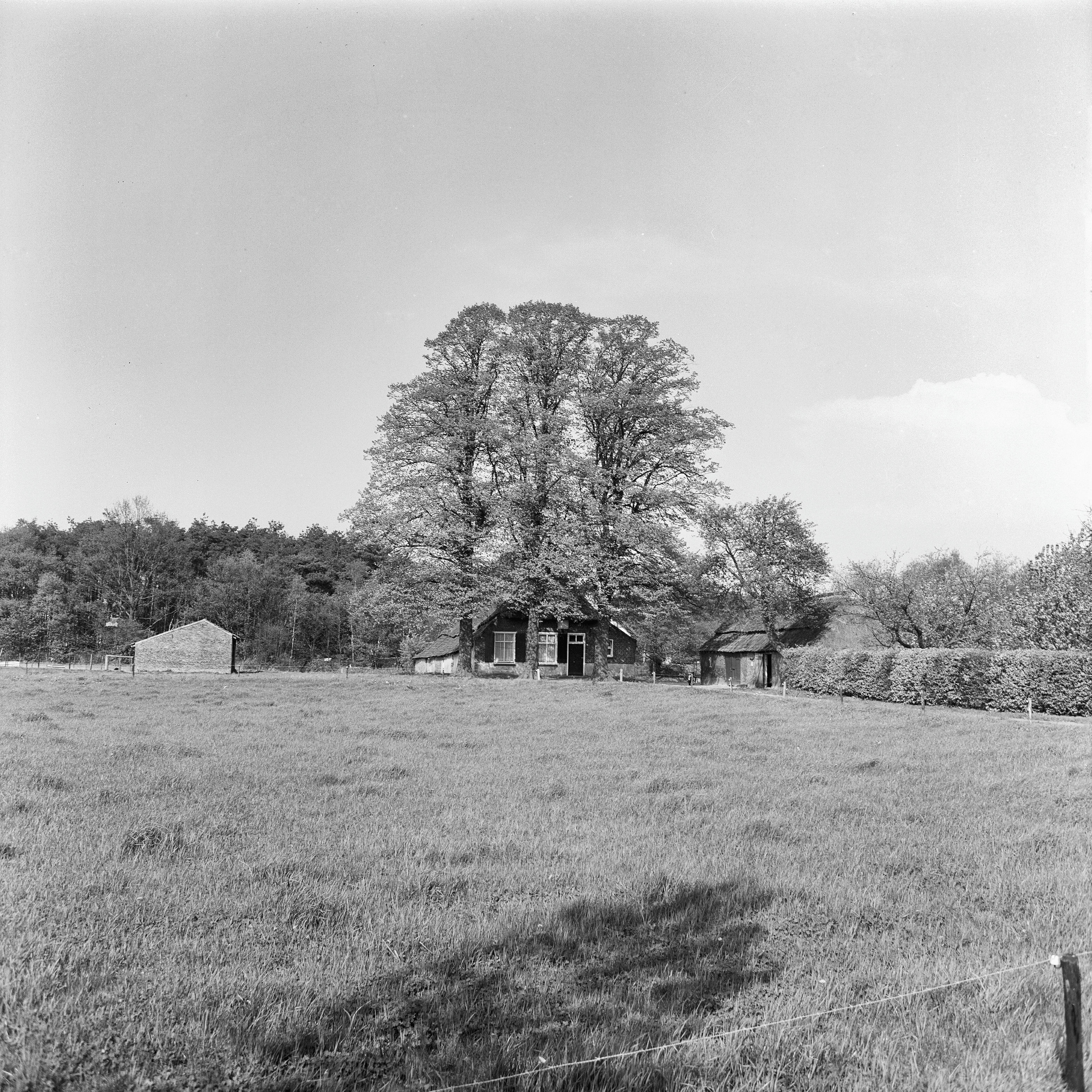
Farm house, Vresselseweg, May 1970

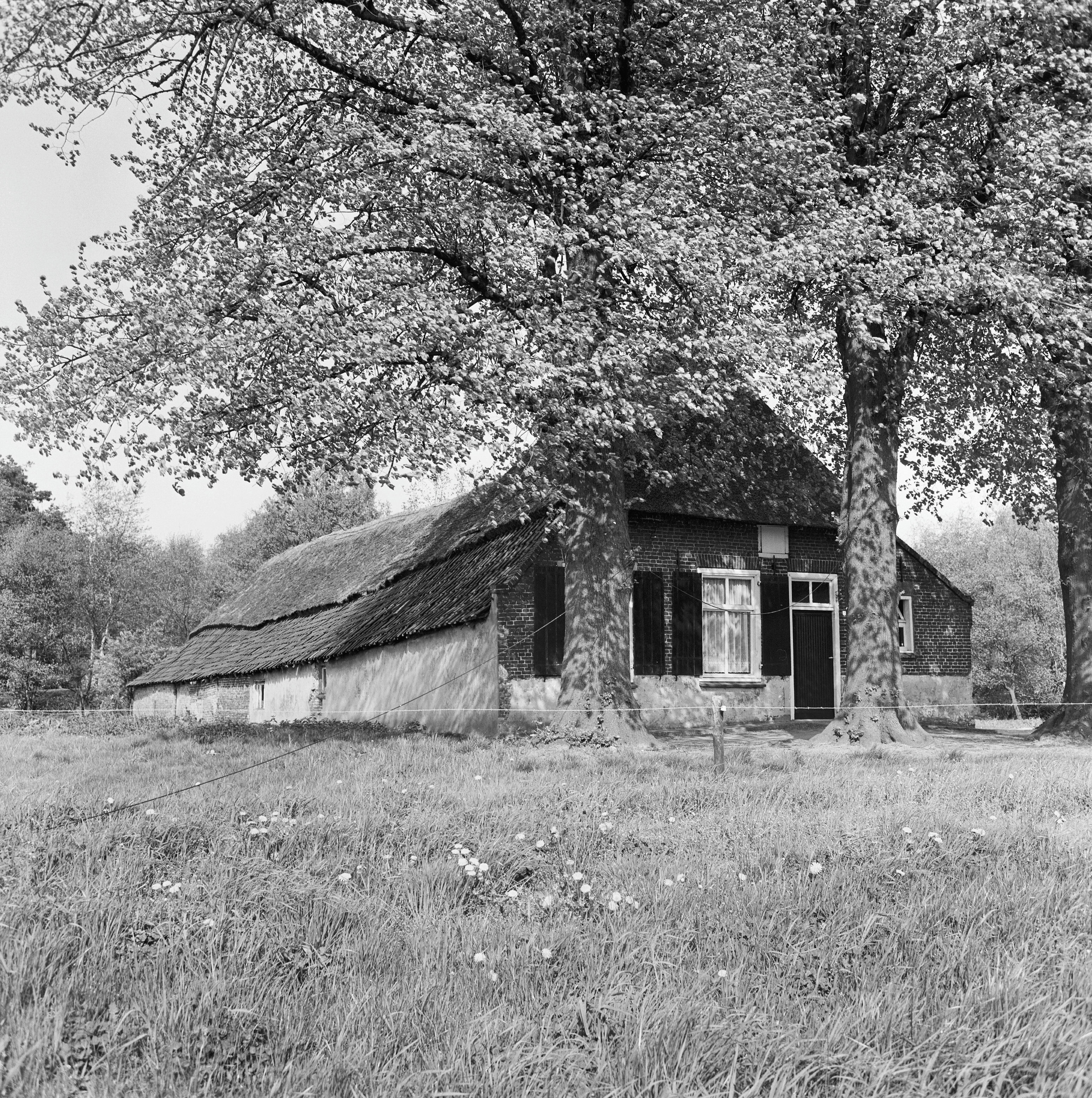
Farm house, Vresselse weg, May 1970

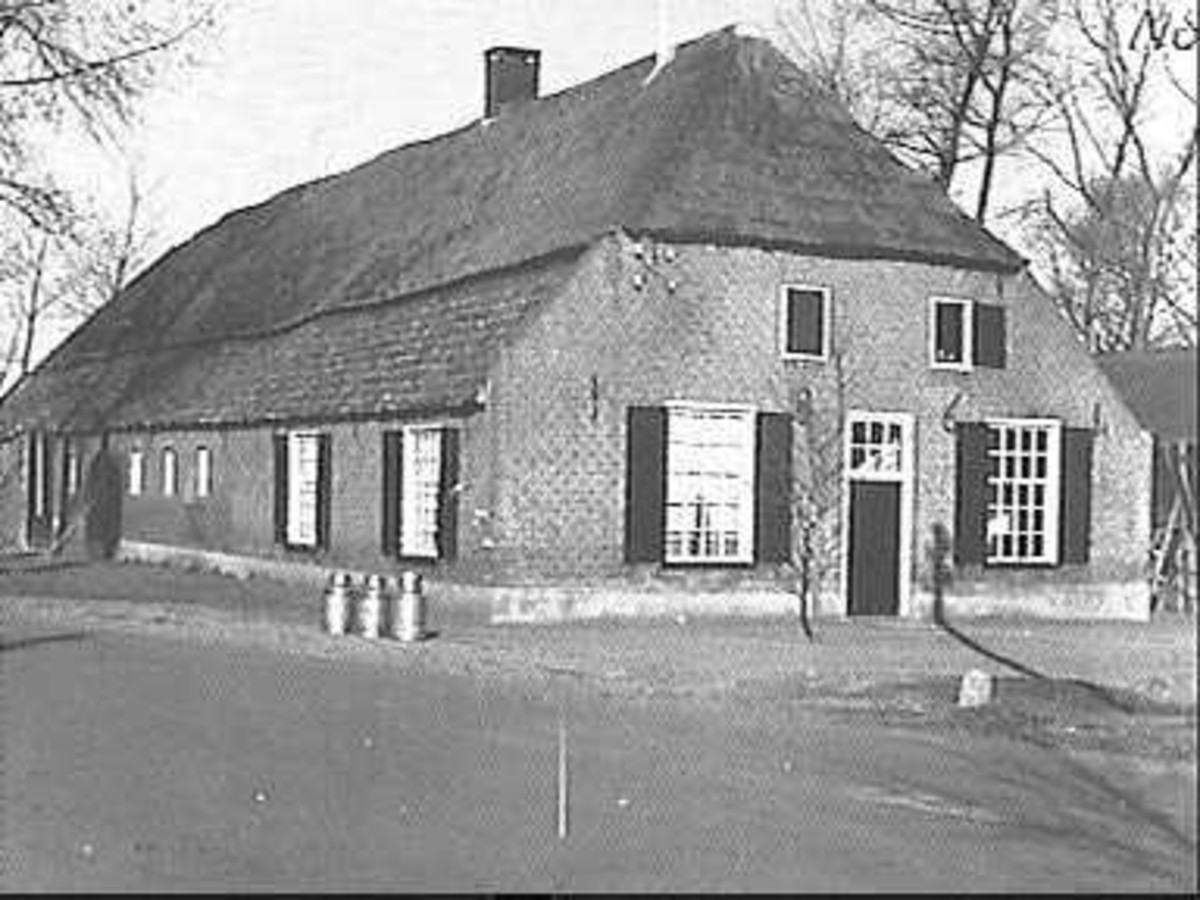
Typical Brabantian style Hall house, April 15, 1942, Nijnsel

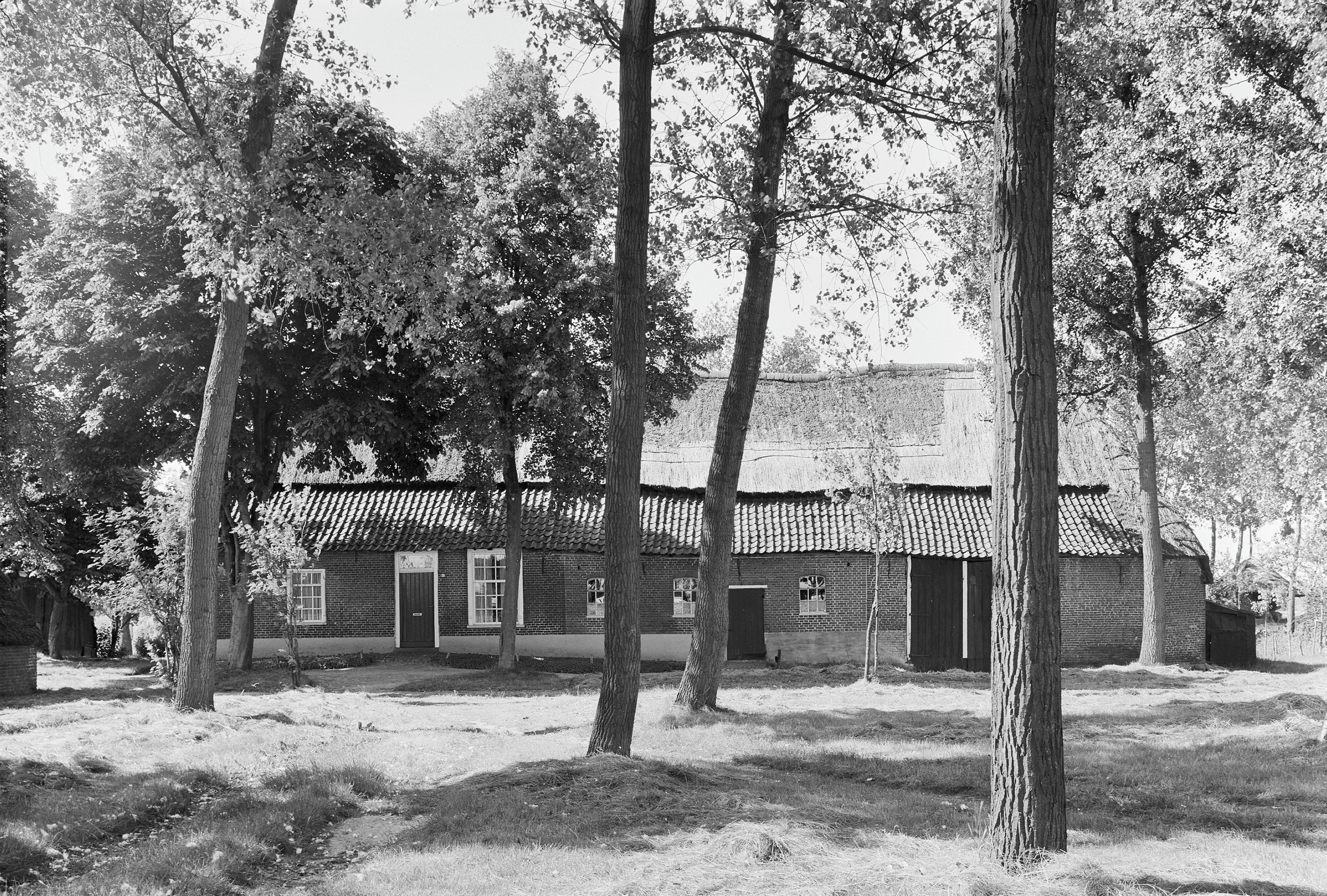
Farm house, Lieshoutseweg, Nijnsel, 1968

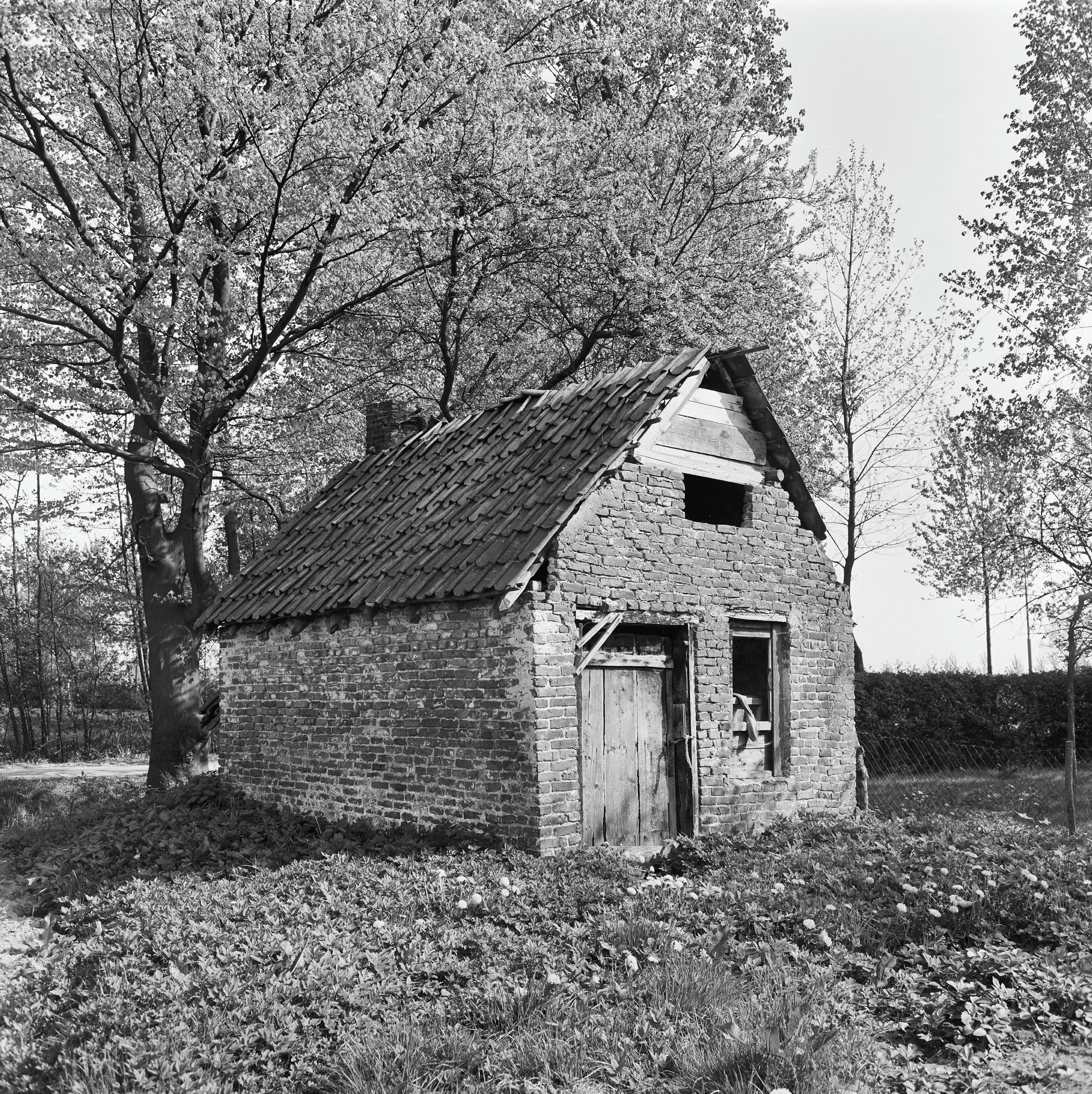
Old baking house, Vresselseweg, May 1970

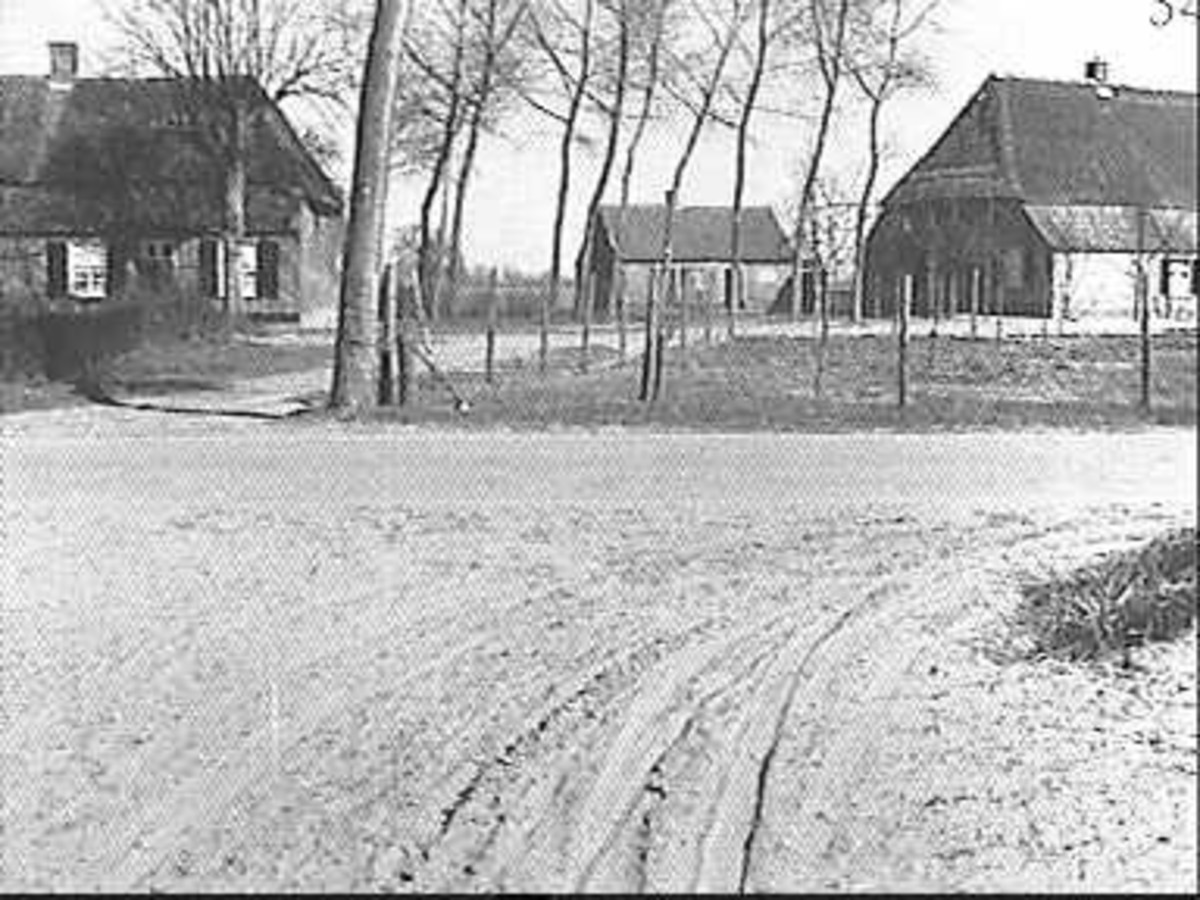
Old Brabantian style farm stead, Lieshoutseweg, April 15, 1942

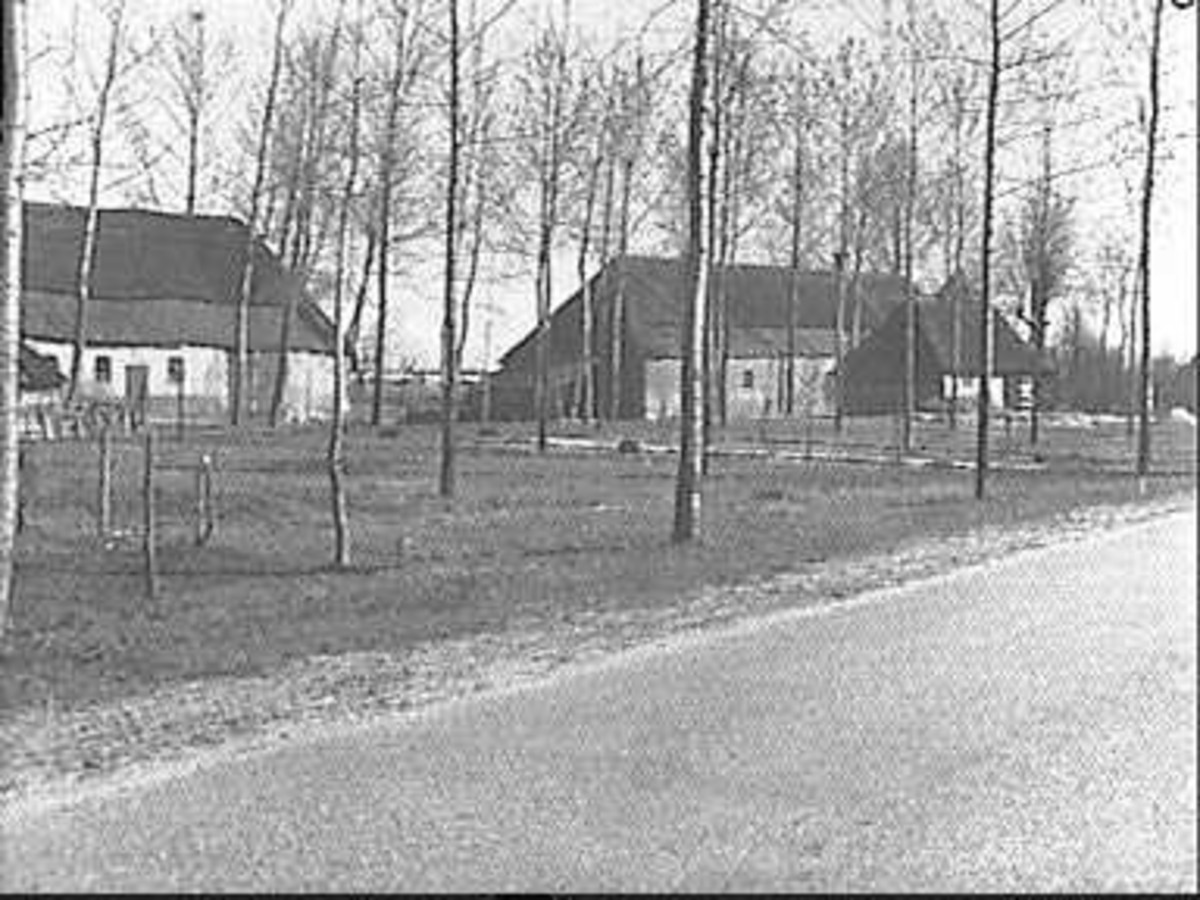
Old Brabantian style farm stead, Lieshoutseweg, April 15, 1942

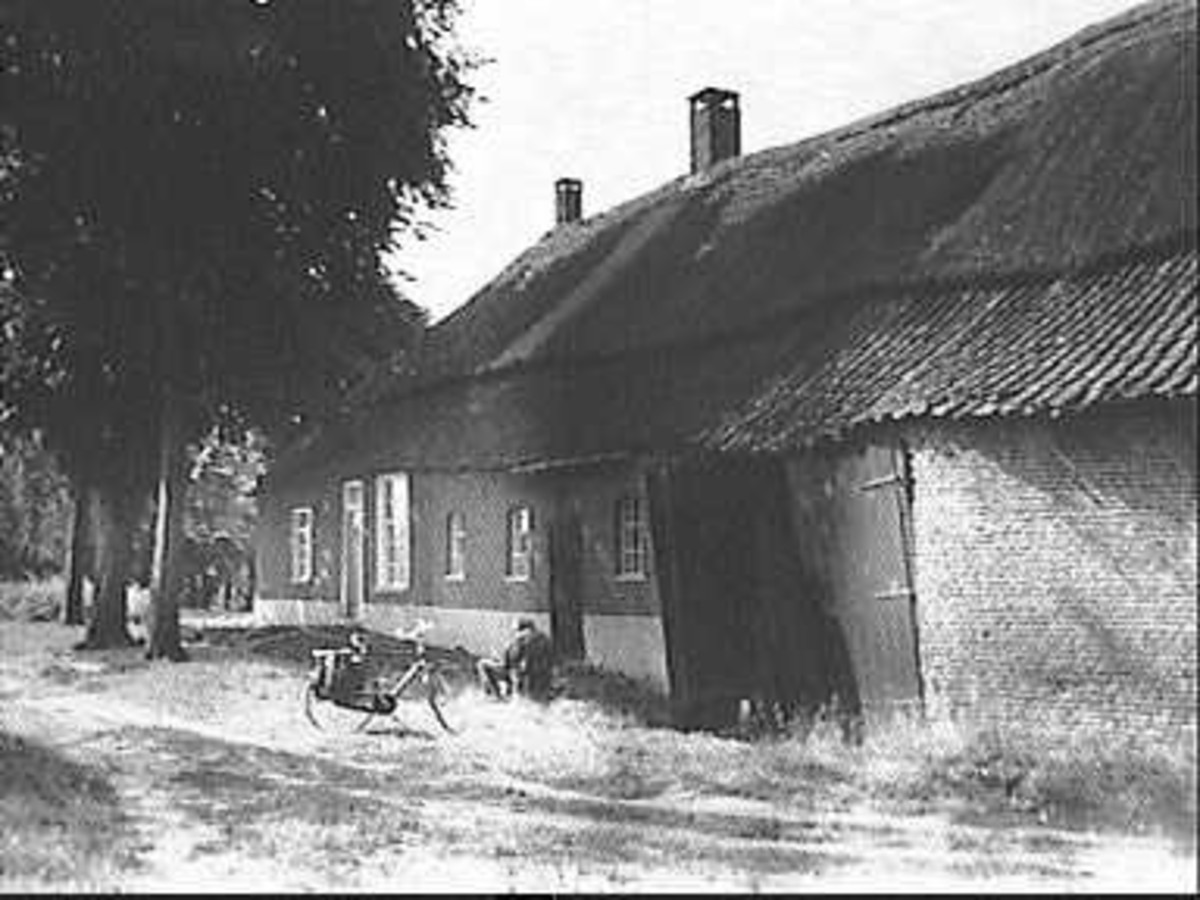
Old Brabantian style farm stead, Lieshoutseweg, September 7, 1984

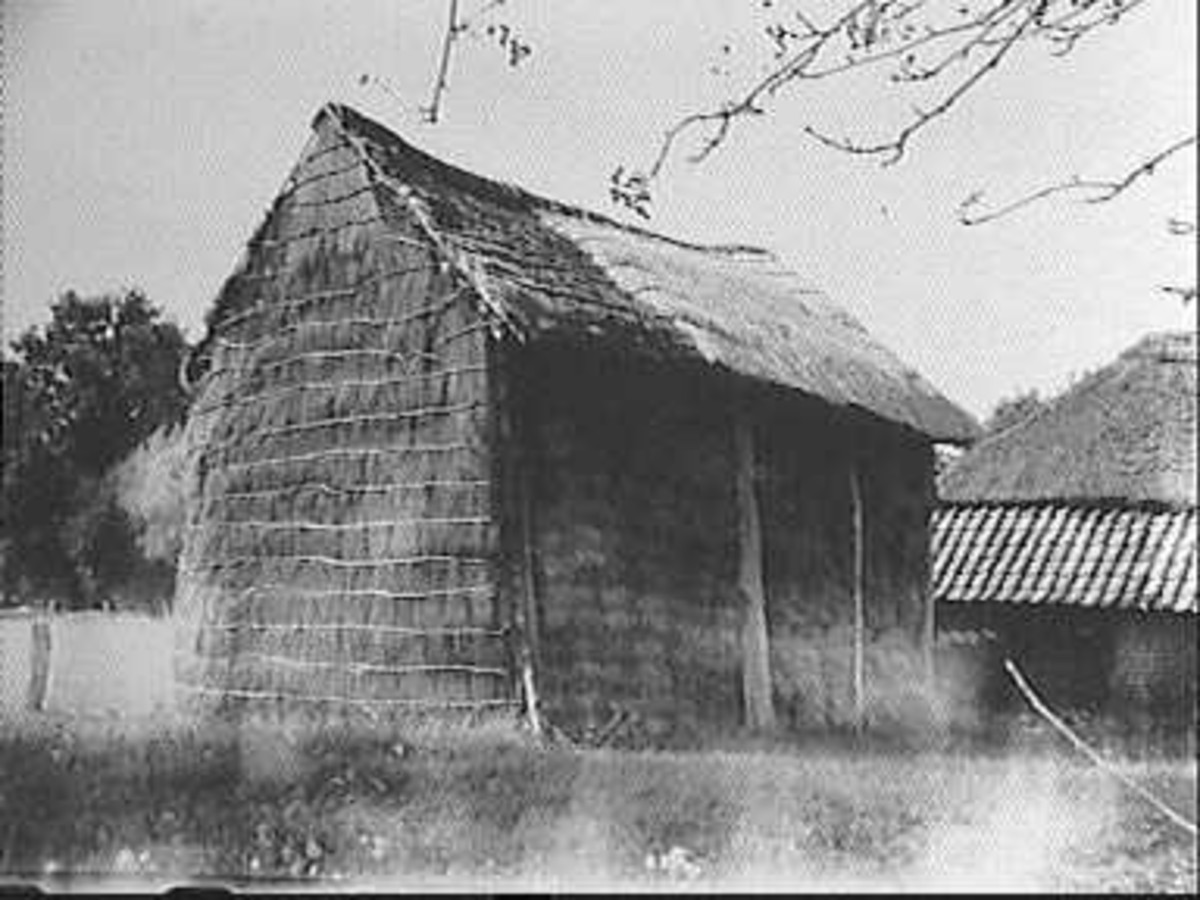
Hay shed, Lieshoutseweg, Nijnsel, September 7, 1984

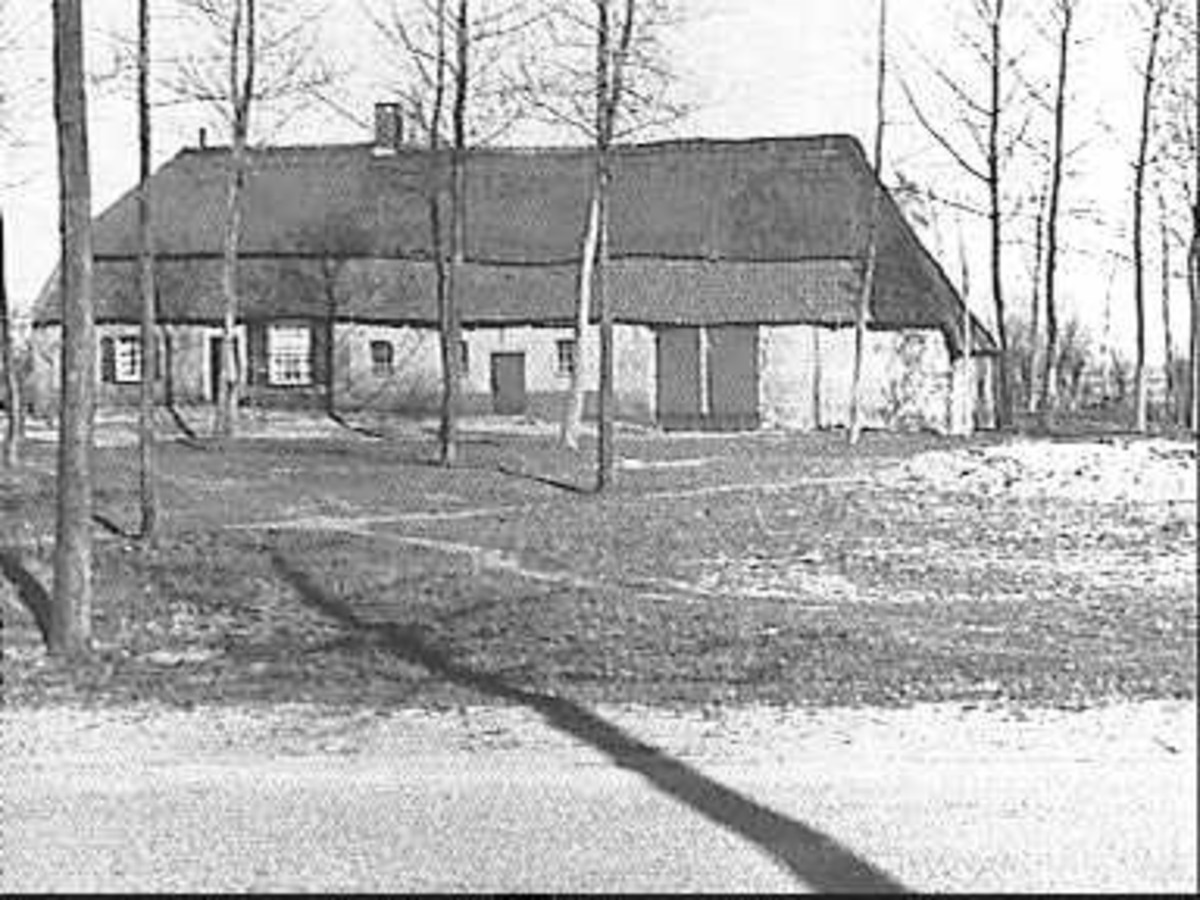
Traditional Brabantian style farm stead, April 15, 1942

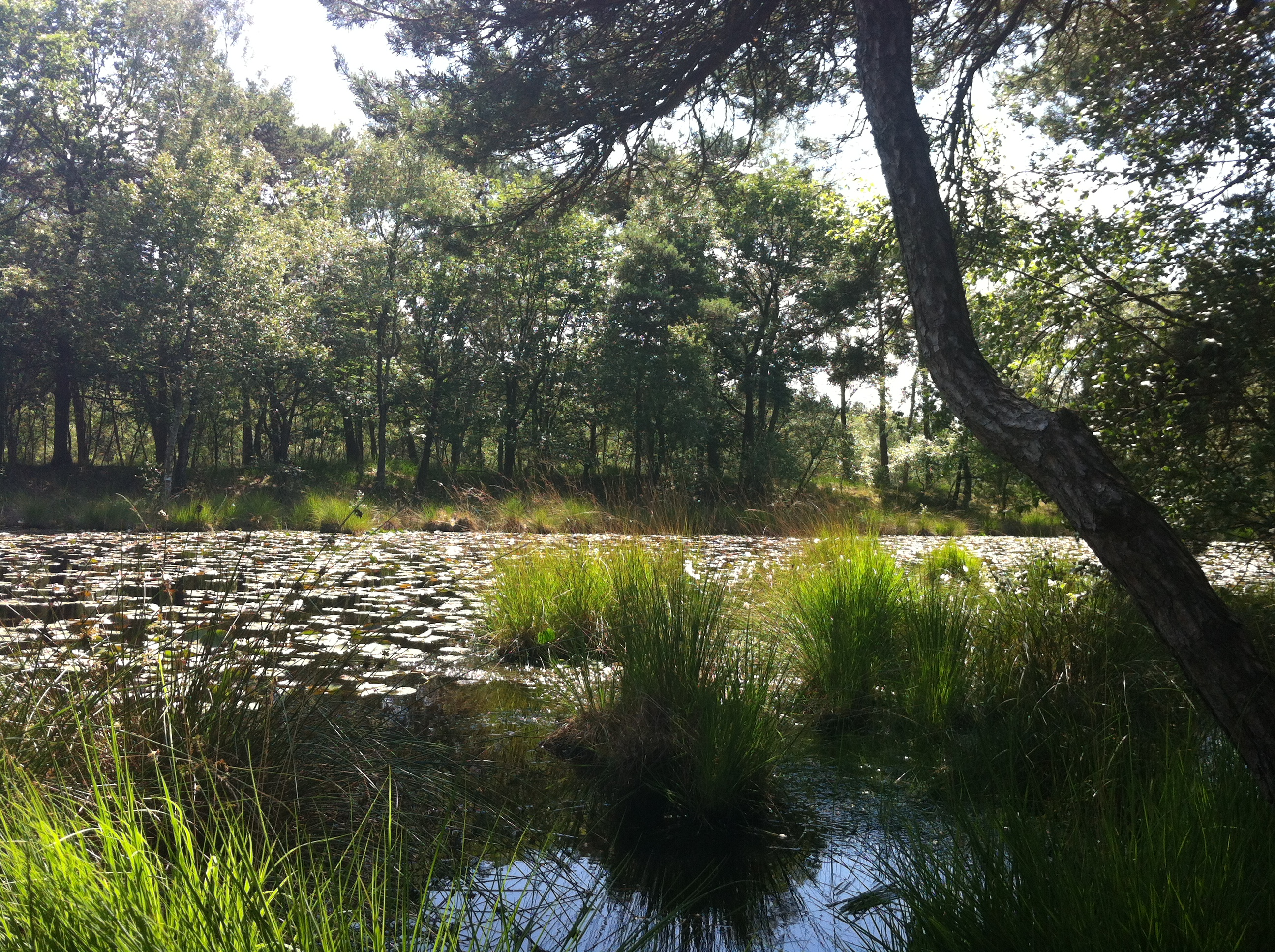
Hazenputten

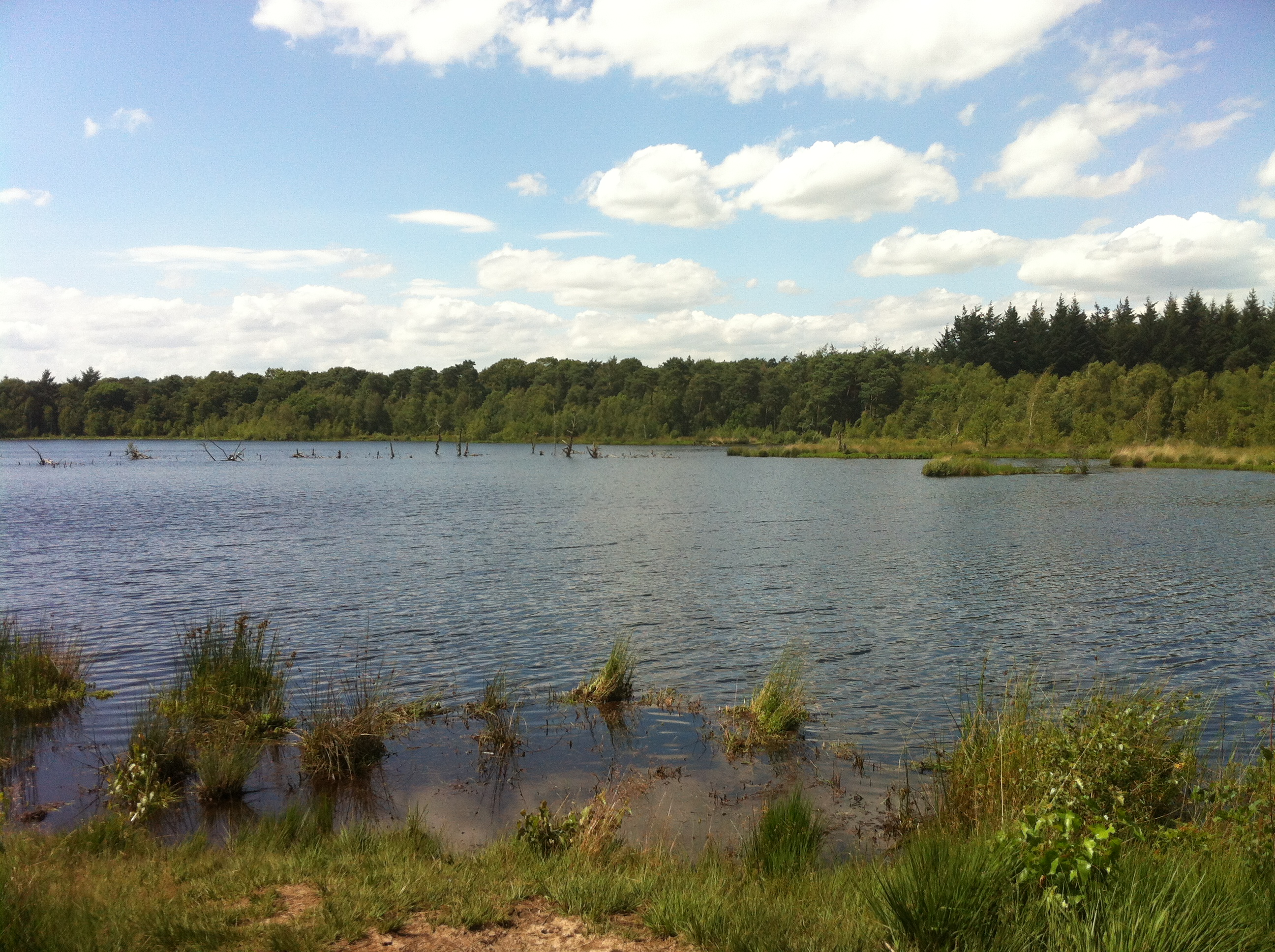
Hazenputten; Fen in the Vresselse Bossen

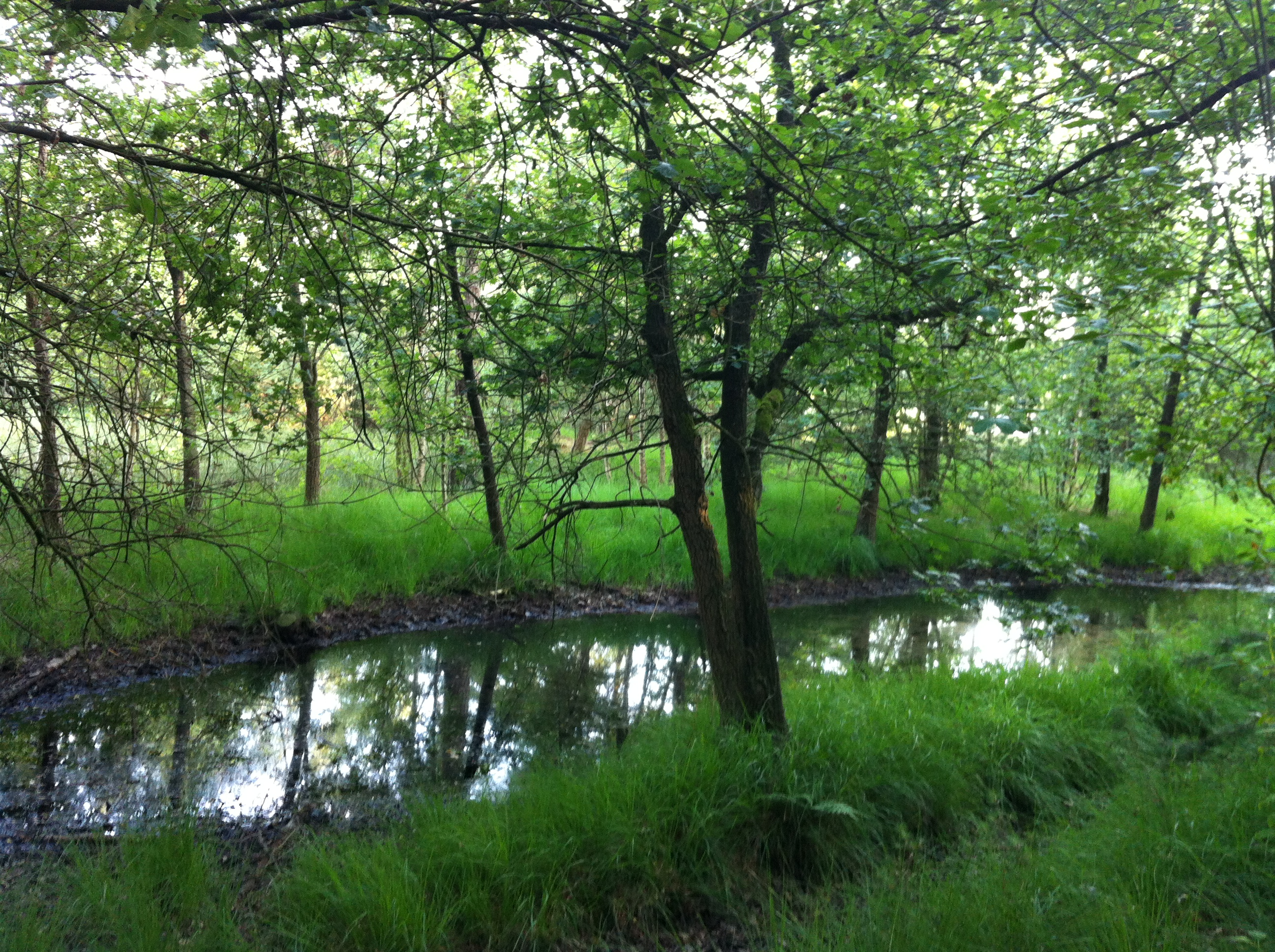
Vresselse Bossen

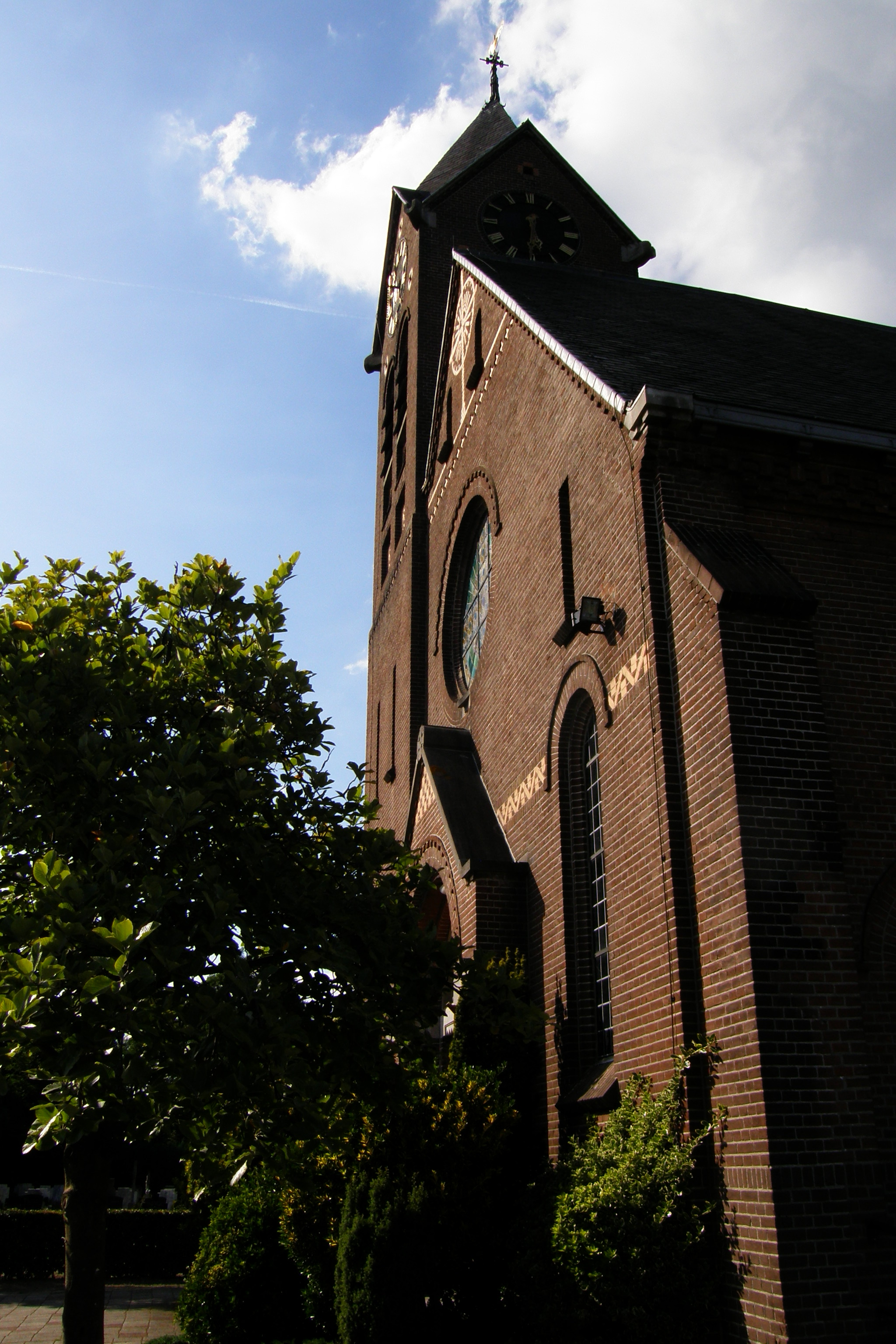
Catholic Church, Nijnsel

== Trivia ==
- During the yearly carnaval a youth parade is held and the name of the village is temporary changed into Kneutergat.
- In November the arrival of Sinterklaas in the village is celebrated by a parade for the village children by the characters involving the holiday.
- The spoken language is North Meierijs (an East Brabantian dialect, which is very similar to colloquial Dutch).
