= Vresselse Bossen =

Dutch nature reserve

Coordinates: 51.5471°N 5.5146°E

East of the village of Nijnsel and the hamlet of Vressel, both in Meierijstad, North Brabant, Netherlands, is the location of the Vresselse bossen or Vresselsche Bosch (Vressels Forest). The Vresselse Bossen is a forest area of 241 ha. It is owned and managed by the National Forest Service (Staatsbosbeheer). The forest is named after the nearby hamlet of Vressel.

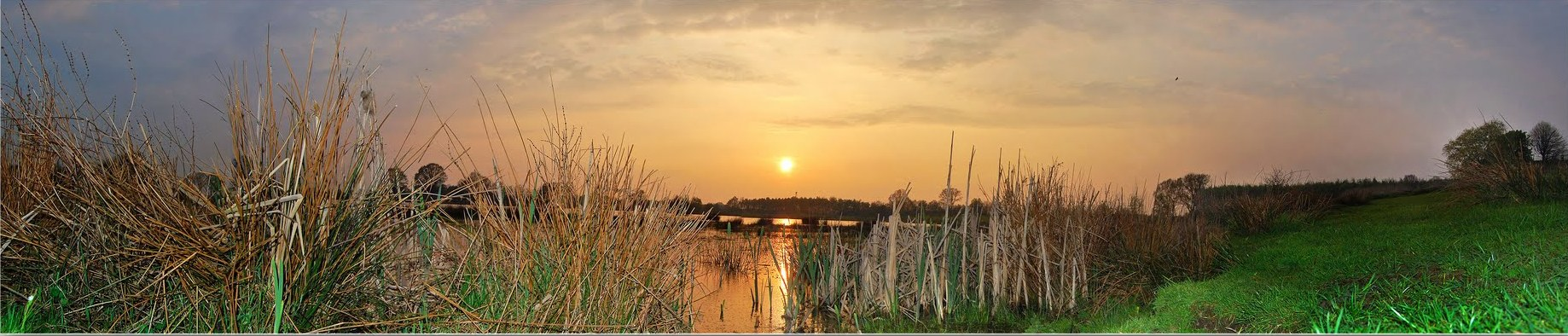
The fen "Hazenputten" in the Vresselse Bossen in Nijnsel

It is a young forest that planted in a drift-sand ridge. At the beginning of the 20th century, there was scarcely a tree in the area. The area consisted mainly of dunes and heathland. At the edges of the area lived farmers who were severely affected by the shifting sands. To protect the fields was therefore decided to reforest the drift-sand. At that time, almost exclusively pine was used for the reforesting. In the 1920s, it had become a production forest consisting of Scots pine for the Limburgian mines.

Within the area, there are two main fen systems: The Hazenputten and the Oude Putten. Rare vegetation is found around the fens: among others White beak-sedge and bog asphodel can be found here.

The contemporary management by Staatsbosbeheer focuses on getting a more varied forest composition, including native oak, linden and beech. To prevent the Hazenputten from drying, competing for vegetation is removed around the pools. The area around the marshes has been grazed by Highland cattle and Exmoor horses in the past.

The area has a rich bird population. Breeding birds are: yellowhammer, kingfisher, black woodpecker, northern goshawk, little grebe, European green woodpecker, common buzzard, great egret, long-eared owl, coal tit, little owl, barn owl and crested tit.

Also many species of mammals can be encountered: These include: roe deer, European badger, Eurasian harvest mouse, European polecat, European water vole, European hedgehog, Eurasian red squirrel, common pipistrelle, European hare, brown long-eared bat, stoat, serotine bat, European mole, Natterer's bat, least weasel, red fox, Daubenton's bat, beech marten and several species of shrew, dormice, apodemus and arvicolinae.

The "Hazenputten" was nominated by Staatsbosbeheer for the title of "Most beautiful spot" in the Netherlands in 2013.

The Vresselse Bossen are part of Het Groene Woud, a vast nature area between Eindhoven, Den Bosch and Tilburg. West of the Vresselse Bossen lies the valley of the Dommel; in the northwest, the Vresselse Forest reaches the Moerkuilen. To the north, there is the reclaimed heathland of the Jekschot Heath and to the east lies the DAF test track and Mariahout Forest.

== Trivia ==
- A medium-distance hike can be done in the area while there are also some shorter circular walks possible.
- The area at the Hazenputten was affected by a small bush fire on 7 March 2014.

== Gallery ==
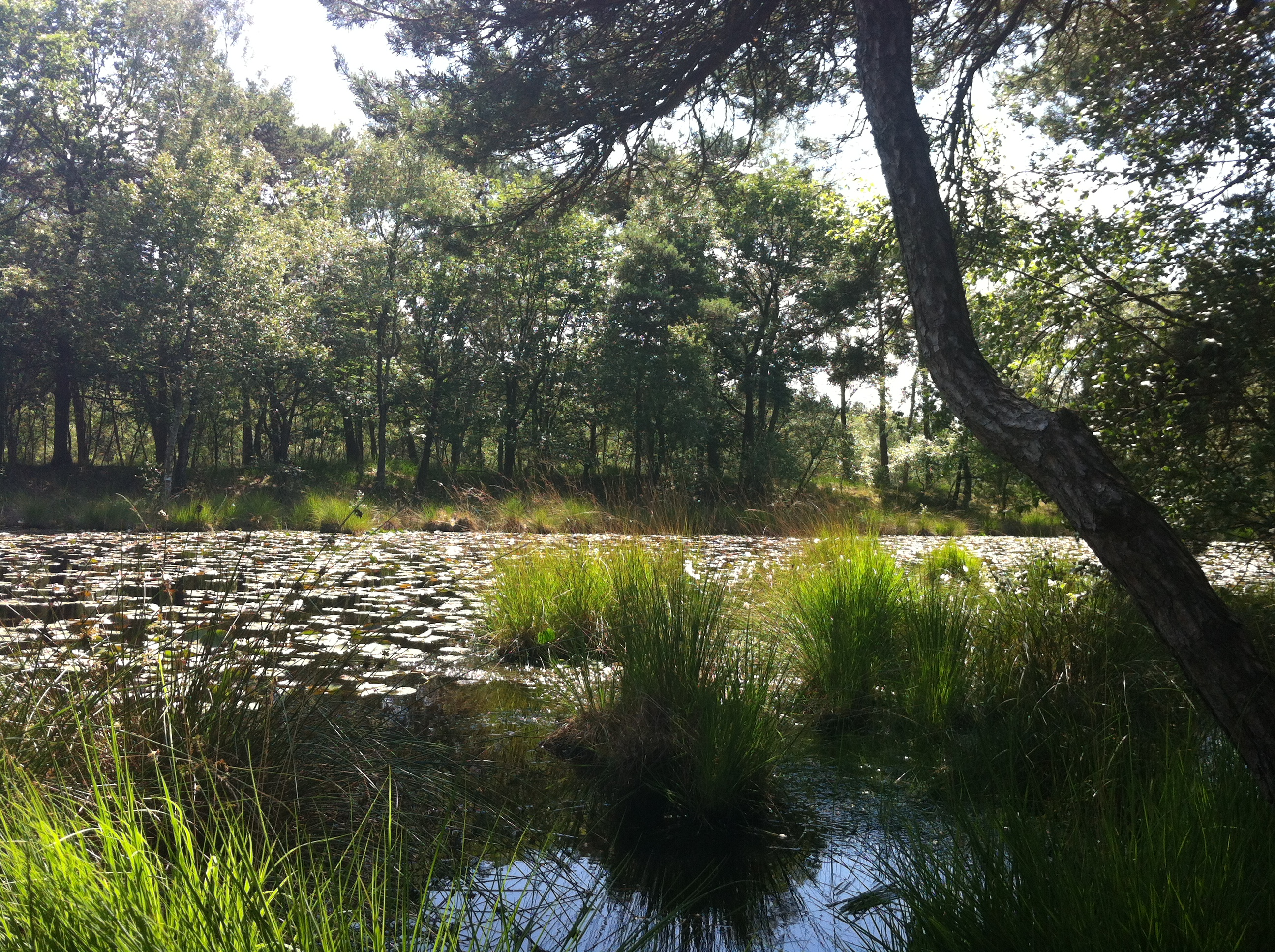

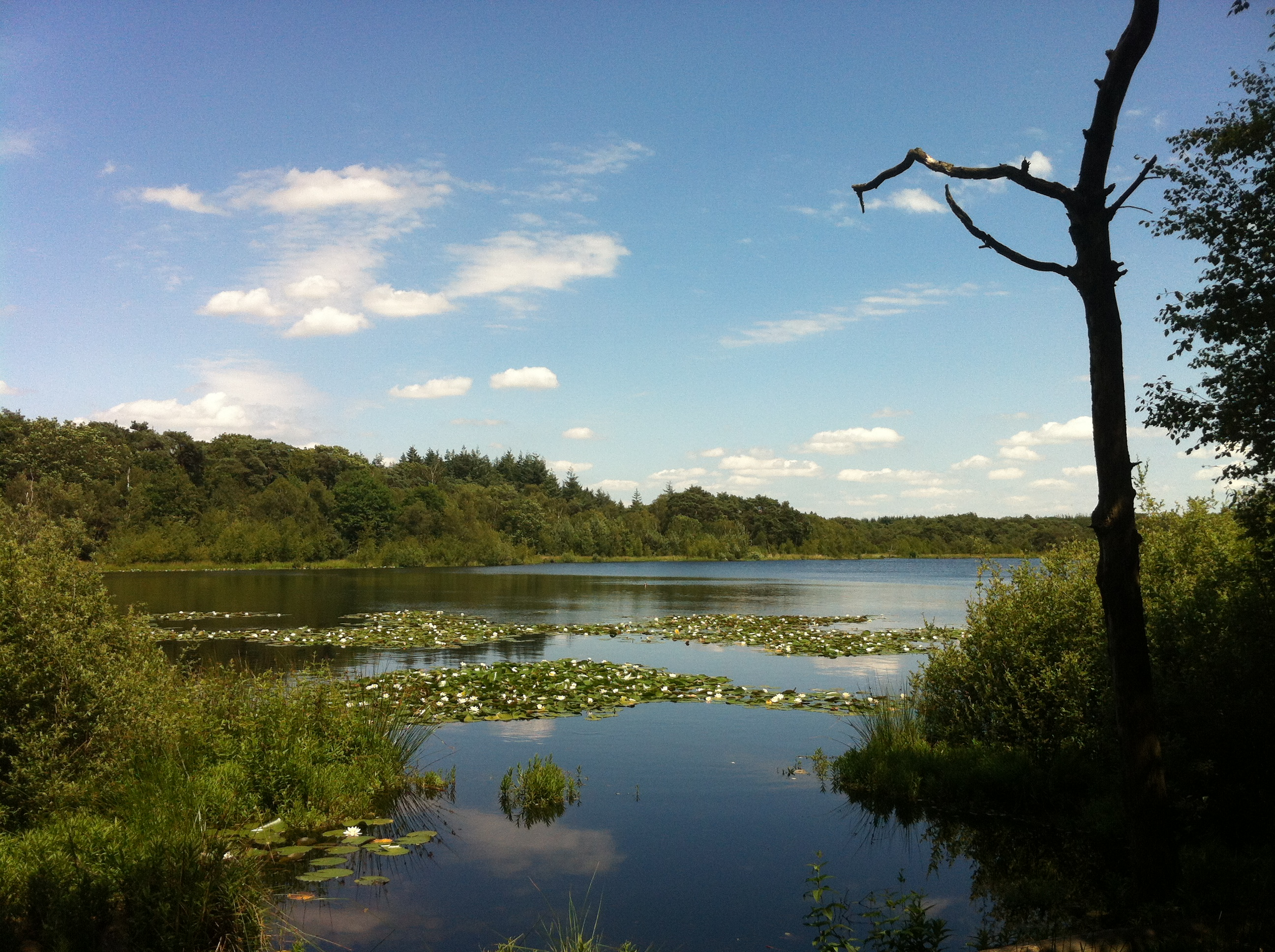

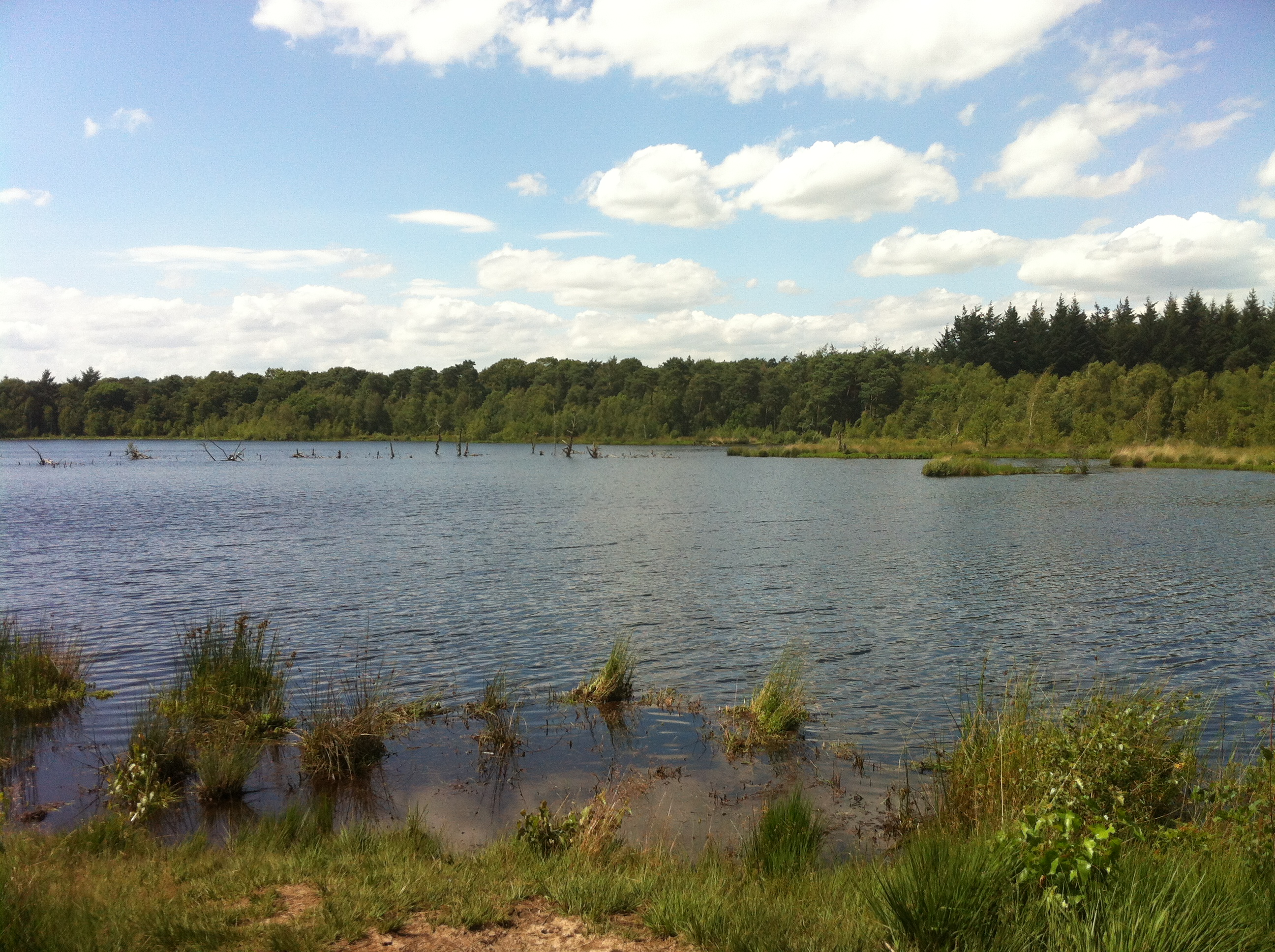

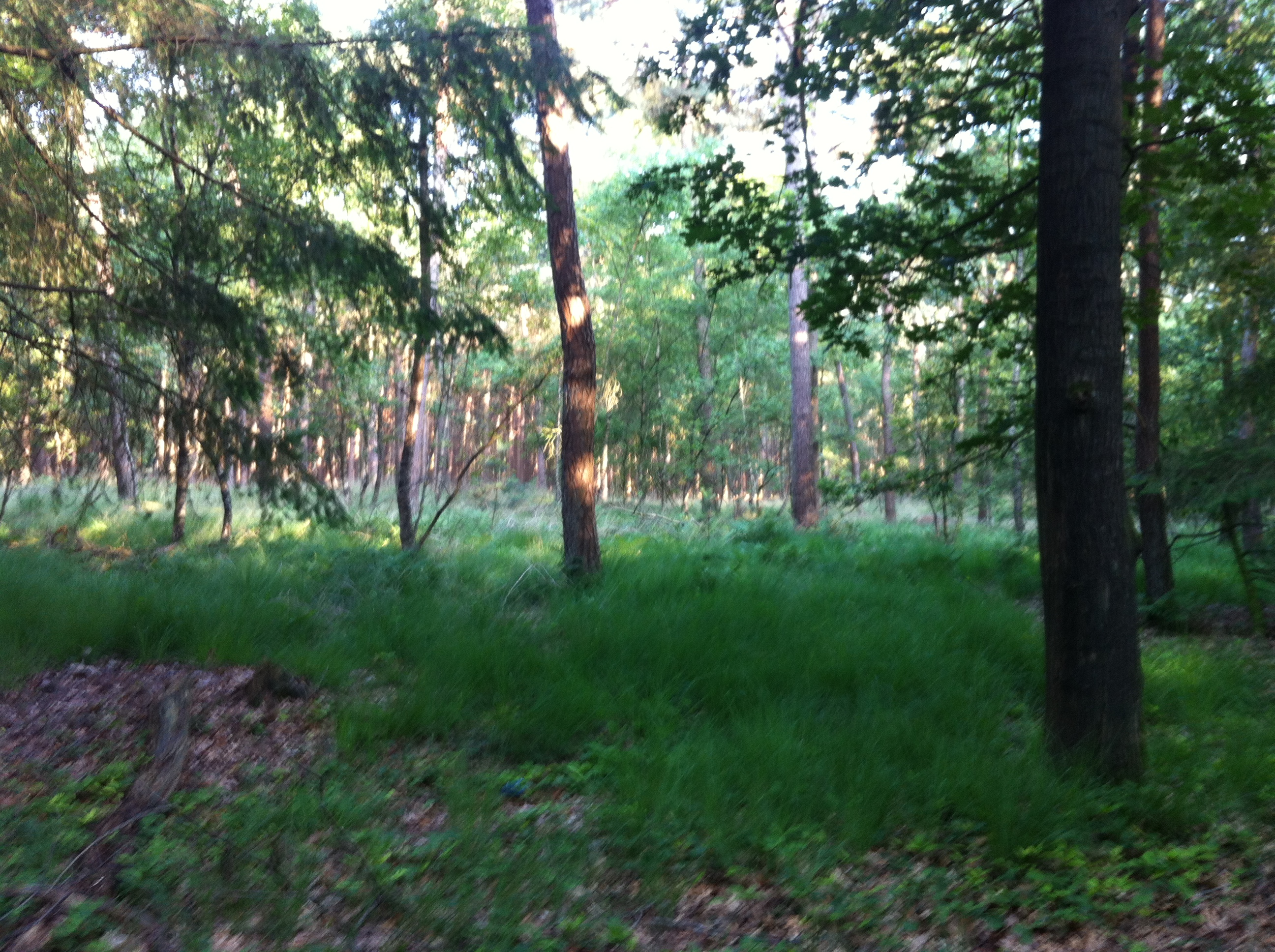

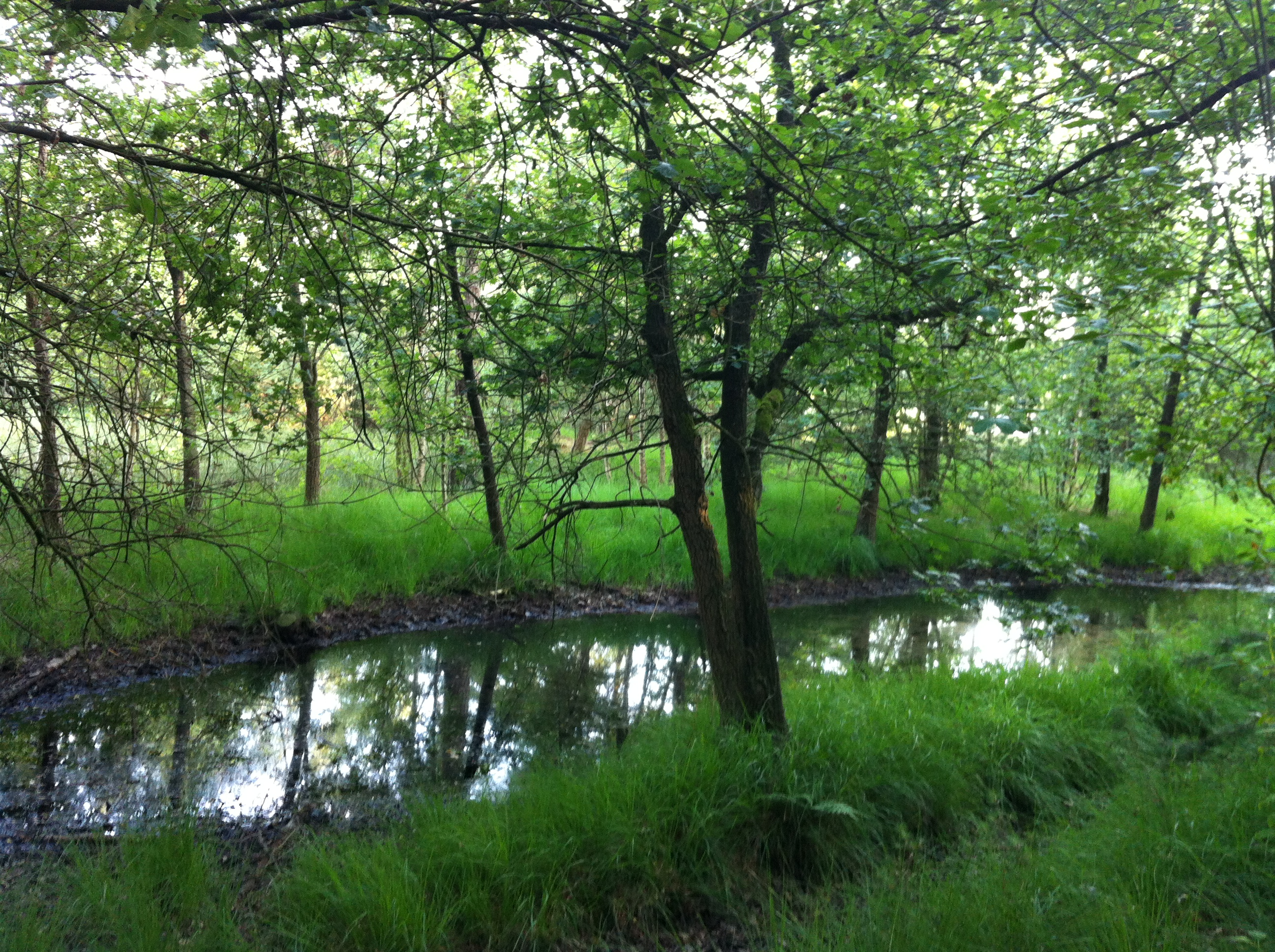

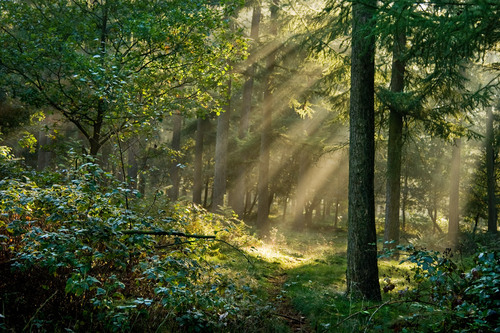

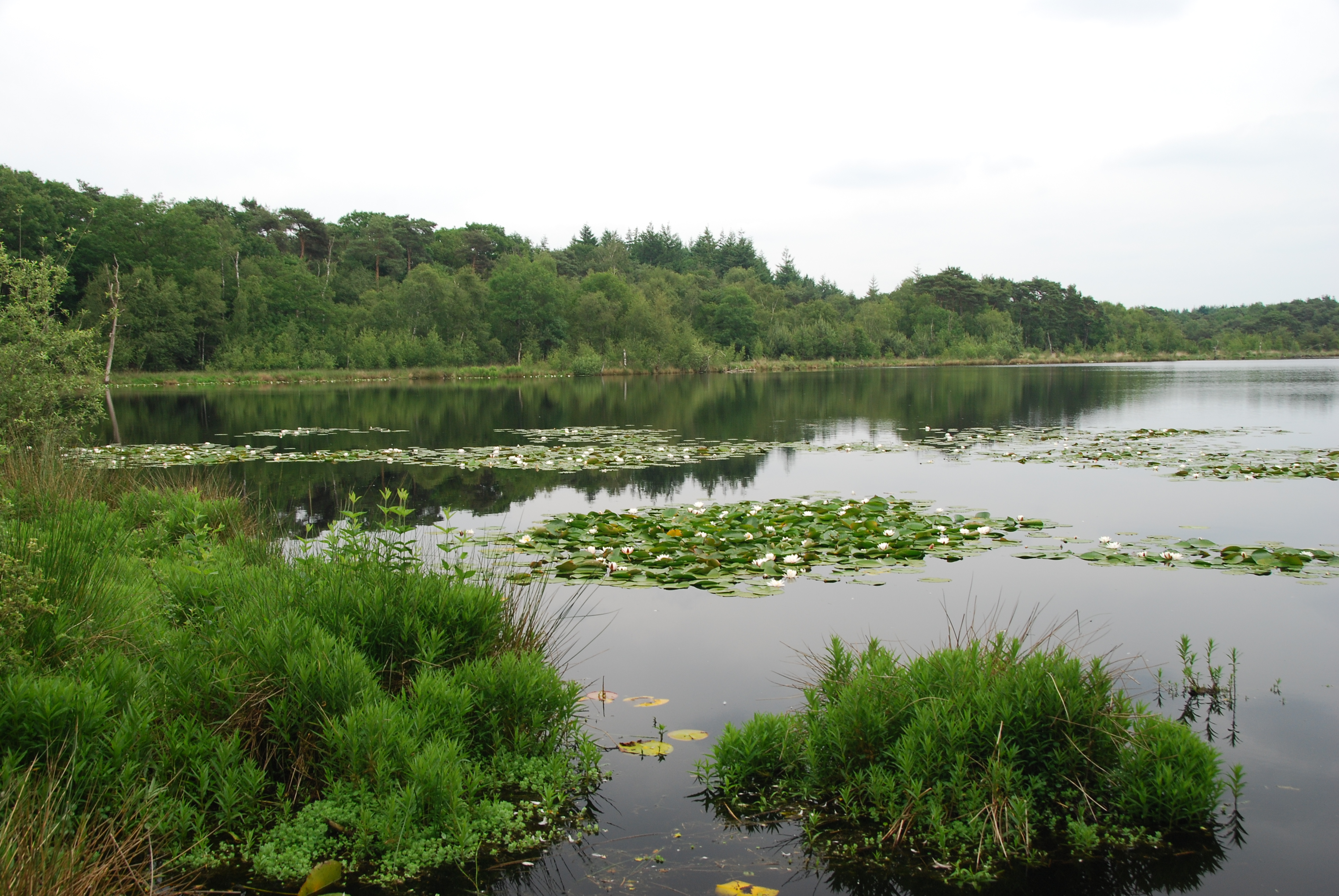
