= Het Groene Woud =

Nature reserve in the Netherlands

Coordinates: 51.5800°N 5.2808°E

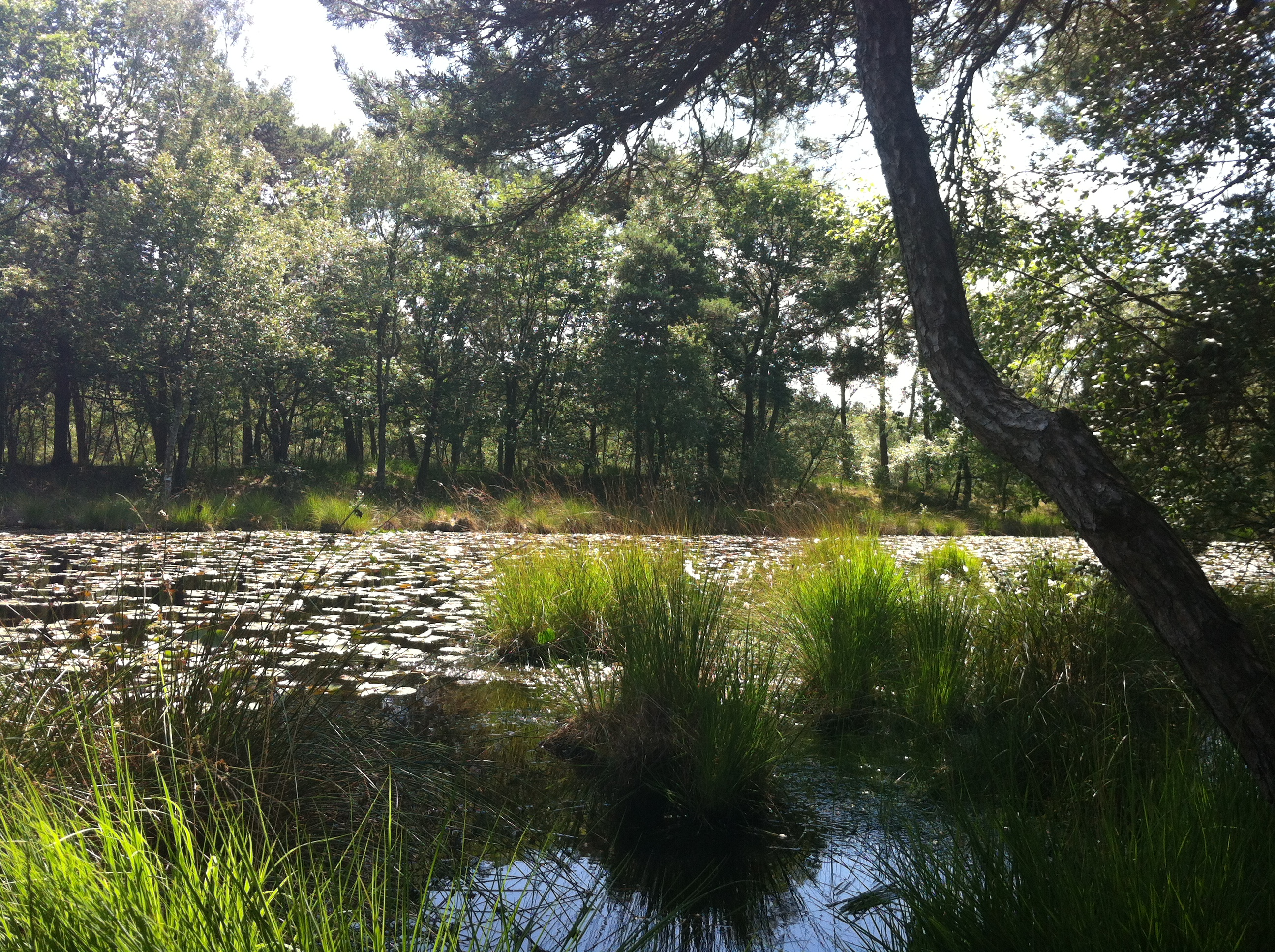
The "Hazenputten", a fen in the Vresselse Bossen in the very east of Het Groene Woud.

Het Groene Woud (The Green Forest) is a special area of the Netherlands which is located in North Brabant between the cities of Tilburg, Eindhoven and 's-Hertogenbosch. It includes nature reserves such as the Kampina, the Oisterwijk forests and fens, Velderbos and the Dommel.

In 2004 "Het Groene Woud" is designated by the government as a National Landscape. This is to prevent the area between the three large cities from becoming more urbanized.

The combination of nature, sustainable agriculture and environmental recreation form a valuable cultural and historical landscape. "Het Groene Woud" covers a total of 7,500 hectares of marshes, meadows and agricultural landscape. It covers the municipalities Boxtel, Sint-Oedenrode, Schijndel, Sint-Michielsgestel, Best, Oirschot, Oisterwijk, Haaren and Vught.

In Het Groene Woud, many species of mammals can be encountered:

These include: red deer (introduced in 2017), roe deer, European badger, Eurasian harvest mouse, European polecat, European water vole, European hedgehog, Eurasian red squirrel, common pipistrelle, European hare, brown long-eared bat, stoat, serotine bat, Eurasian beaver, European mole, Natterer's bat, least weasel, red fox, Daubenton's bat, beech marten and several species of shrew, dormice, apodemus and arvicolinae.

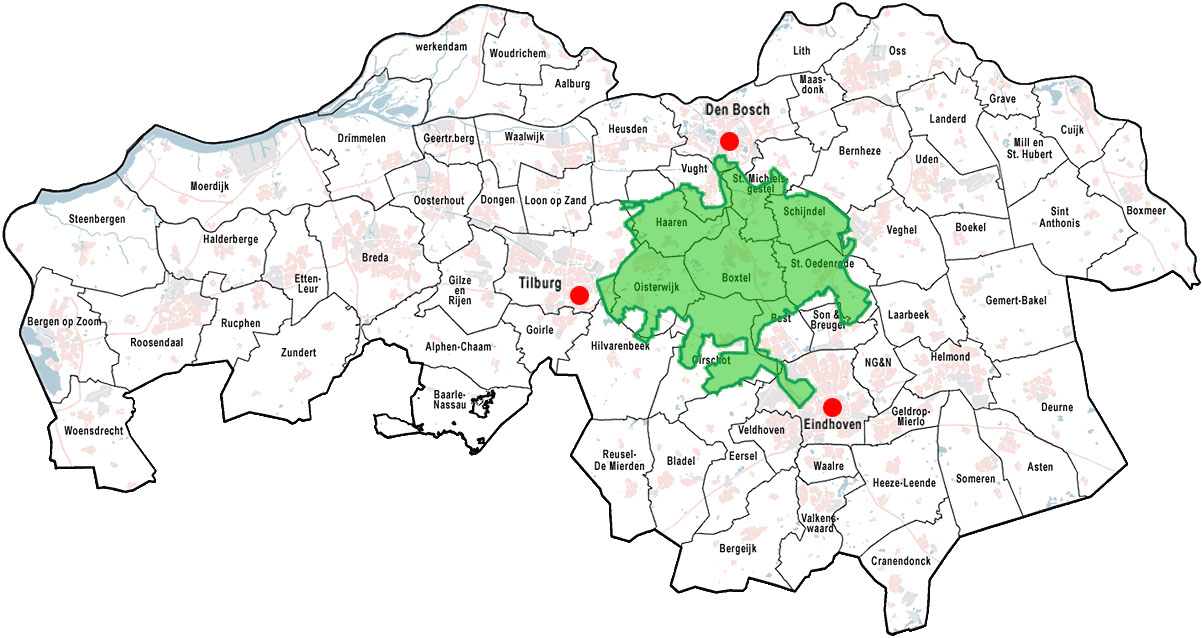
Het Groene Woud or The Green Forest

Hiking, canoeing and cycling activities are possible in this area.
