= Walik =

- Hamlet
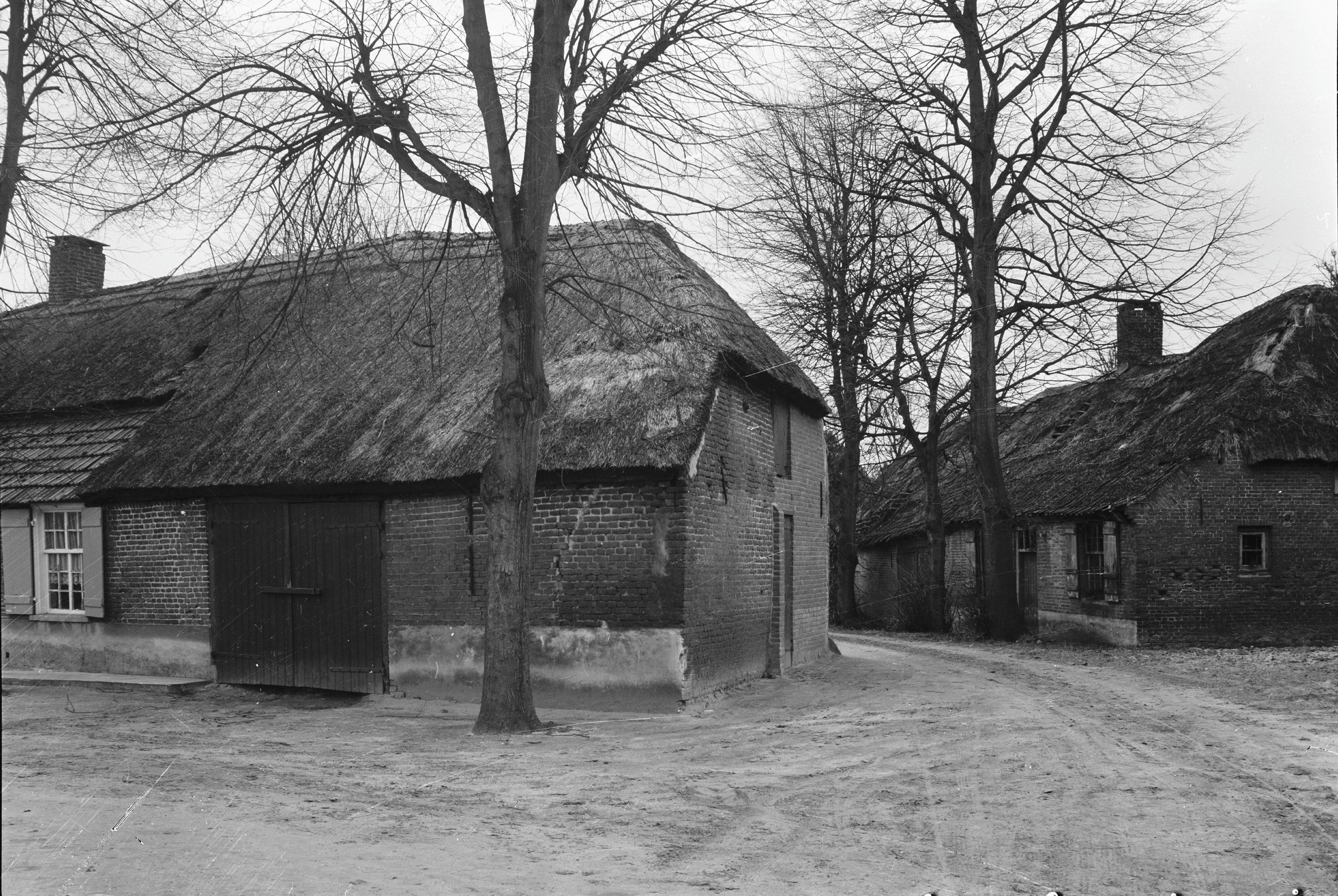
- Farms in Walik (1964)

- Location in the province of North Brabant in the Netherlands Walik (Netherlands)
- Coordinates: 51.3531°N 5.3632°E
- Country: Netherlands
- Province: North Brabant
- Municipality: Bergeijk

Area
  - Total: 0.49 km^{2} (0.19 sq mi)
- Elevation: 28 m (92 ft)

Population (2021)
  - Total: 405
  - Density: 830/km^{2} (2,100/sq mi)
- Time zone: UTC+1 (CET)
  - Summer (DST): UTC+2 (CEST)
- Postal code: 5561
- Dialing code: 040

Walik (Dutch pronunciation: [ˈʋaːlɪk]) is a hamlet in the North-Brabant municipality of Bergeijk and is located to the west of the village of Riethoven.

Walik is an agricultural community with some farms located near a brink (village square).

The hamlet was first mentioned between 1838 and 1857 as Waalwijk, and means "settlement around a pool'. There are three farms around the brink which are characteristic examples of Campian long gable farms and have been declared a monument.
