= Valkenswaard War Cemetery =

WWII CWGC cemetery in The Netherlands

Valkenswaard war cemetery
- Commonwealth War Graves Commission
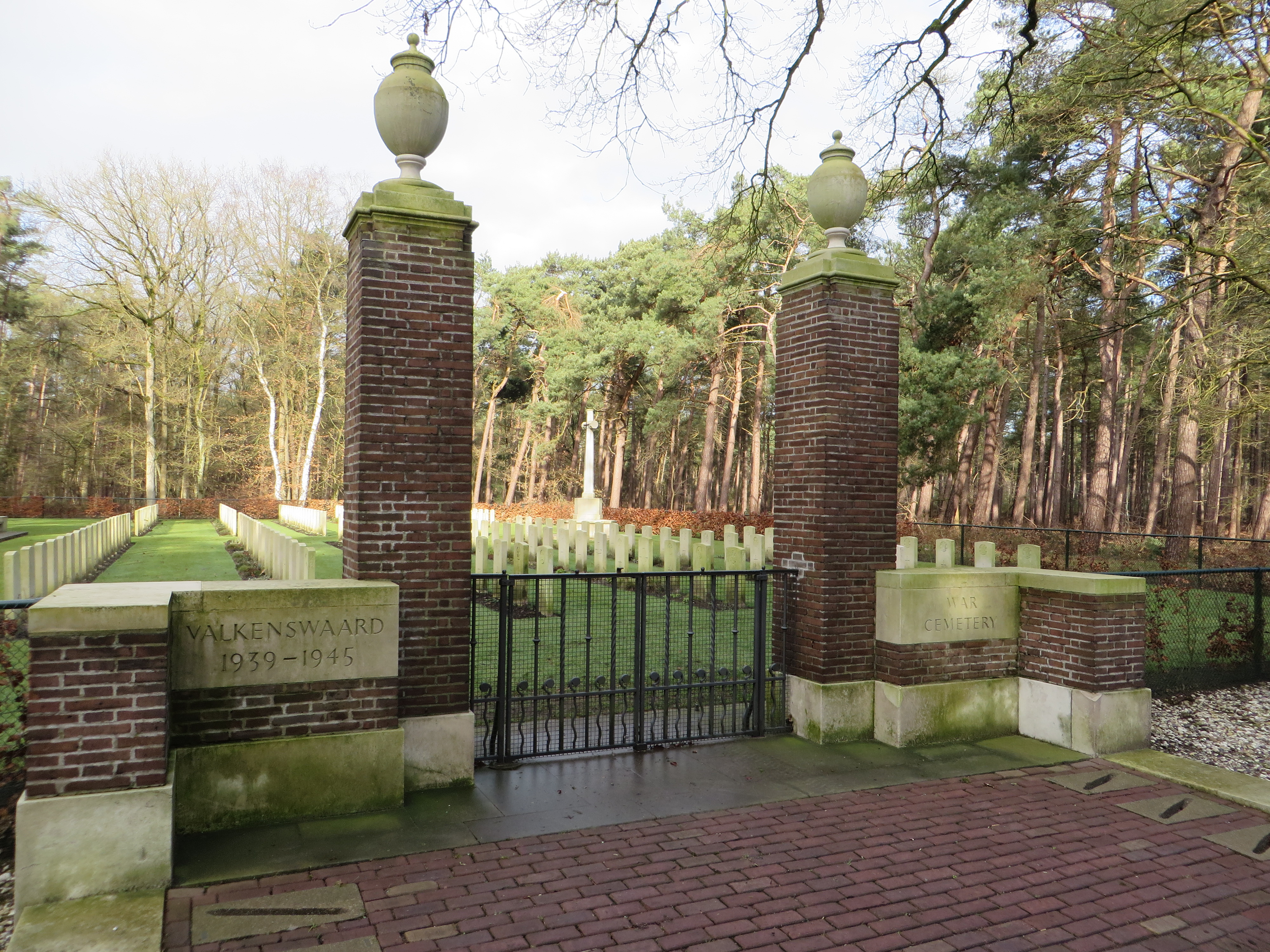
- Entrance gates to the war cemetery
- Used for those deceased 1944-1945
- Established: 1944
- Location: 51°20′58″N 5°27′28″E near Valkenswaard, The Netherlands
- Total burials: 220

Burials by nation
- United Kingdom 220

Burials by war
- World War II: 220

Valkenswaard war cemetery is a Second World War military war grave cemetery, located in the village of Valkenswaard, 12 km (7.5 mi) south of Eindhoven in The Netherlands. It contains British soldiers killed during the Allied push into the Netherlands during the autumn and winter of 1944.

216 identified British service personnel are interred in the cemetery and a further four are unidentified.

== History ==
The Commonwealth soldiers interred in the cemetery fell in battles in Valkenswaard and the surrounding region (such as at Best, Eersel and Bergeijk). The soldiers were killed between 14 September 1944 and 29 November 1944 with the exception on one soldier who died on 21 January 1945. The majority of the soldiers come from the Irish Guards and Devonshire Regiment.

A temporary field burial site at Valkenswaard was set up at the beginning of October 1944 by No. 55 Graves Registration Unit. The earliest casualty interred in the cemetery dates from 14 September 1944. The liberation of Valkenswaard on the 17 September 1944 is where the majority of the soldiers fell in battle.

In early May 1945 the first mention of a permanent British war cemetery on the site is recorded. Additional fallen soldiers from northern Belgium and southern Holland were removed from their field burial sites and re-interred at Valkenswaard by the graves concentration unit of the British Army. The local community initially took care of the graves until the cemetery was officially passed to the then Imperial War Graves Commission on 15 June 1946. The Cross of Sacrifice was erected in 1949 and the replacement of headstones was begun.

Commemoration ceremonies occur twice a year in the cemetery. On the anniversary of the liberation of Valkenswaard on 17 September and on May 4, the Dutch national day of remembrance.

== Location ==
The burial ground was an open field close to a forest between the villages of Valkenswaard and Westerhoven.
