= Gnome King Kyrië =

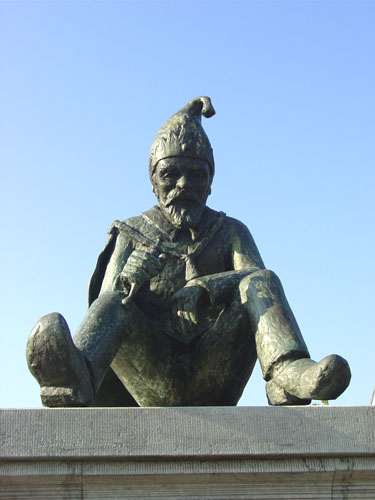
Kyrië, the Kabouter king from folklore from the Campine, a region in the Dutch province of North Brabant

Gnome king Kyrië (Dutch: Kabouterkoning Kyrië, pronounced [kaːˈbʌutərˌkoːnɪŋ ˈkiːrijə]) is, according to local folklore, the leader of the legendary gnomes (kabouters) who lived in the Campine region of the province of North Brabant, the Netherlands. These gnomes had their base in the village of Hoogeloon, from which they journeyed into neighboring lands. According to tradition the gnome king Kyrië lived on the Kerkakkers in the Kabouterberg ("gnome mountain"), also known as Duivelsberg ("devil's mountain"), a tumulus located in the Koebosch forest, slightly northeast of Hoogeloon.

== Description ==
The gnomes of the Campine were helpful creatures who helped mostly farmers and households in the Campine and also in the neighboring lands of the Peel and the Meierij. They came by night and did not want to be seen by people. If people did see them, they were punished by the gnomes. One story tells of an inquisitive farmer who spied on the gnomes and later became blind in one eye as a punishment.

== The death of Kyrië ==
Gnome king Kyrië was shot by a hunter in the heathlands of Riethoven. He had just enough strength to reach the Duivelsberg (one of the Neolithic burial mounds, located in the Hoogeloon heath) where the gnomes lived. The hunter looked for what he had shot and heard the shocked gnomes say, "Kyrië is dead". The message spread quickly among all gnome settlements in the region. Gnome king Kyrië was buried somewhere in Hoogeloon. After the death of their king, all the gnomes left for an unknown destination. In one version of the story, the king's death is announced by a traveler, a narrative structure that may come from Plutarch.

== Statue ==
In Hoogeloon, a village pump with a statue of gnome king Kyrië on it was erected on the Valensplein in 1985. It was designed by Gubbels. On 9 April 2001, the pump and statue were moved to another place on the same square after a reconstruction of the Valensplein. At the same time, a special bitter, Koning Kyrië Kruidenbitter, was introduced.
