= Westerhoven =

- Village
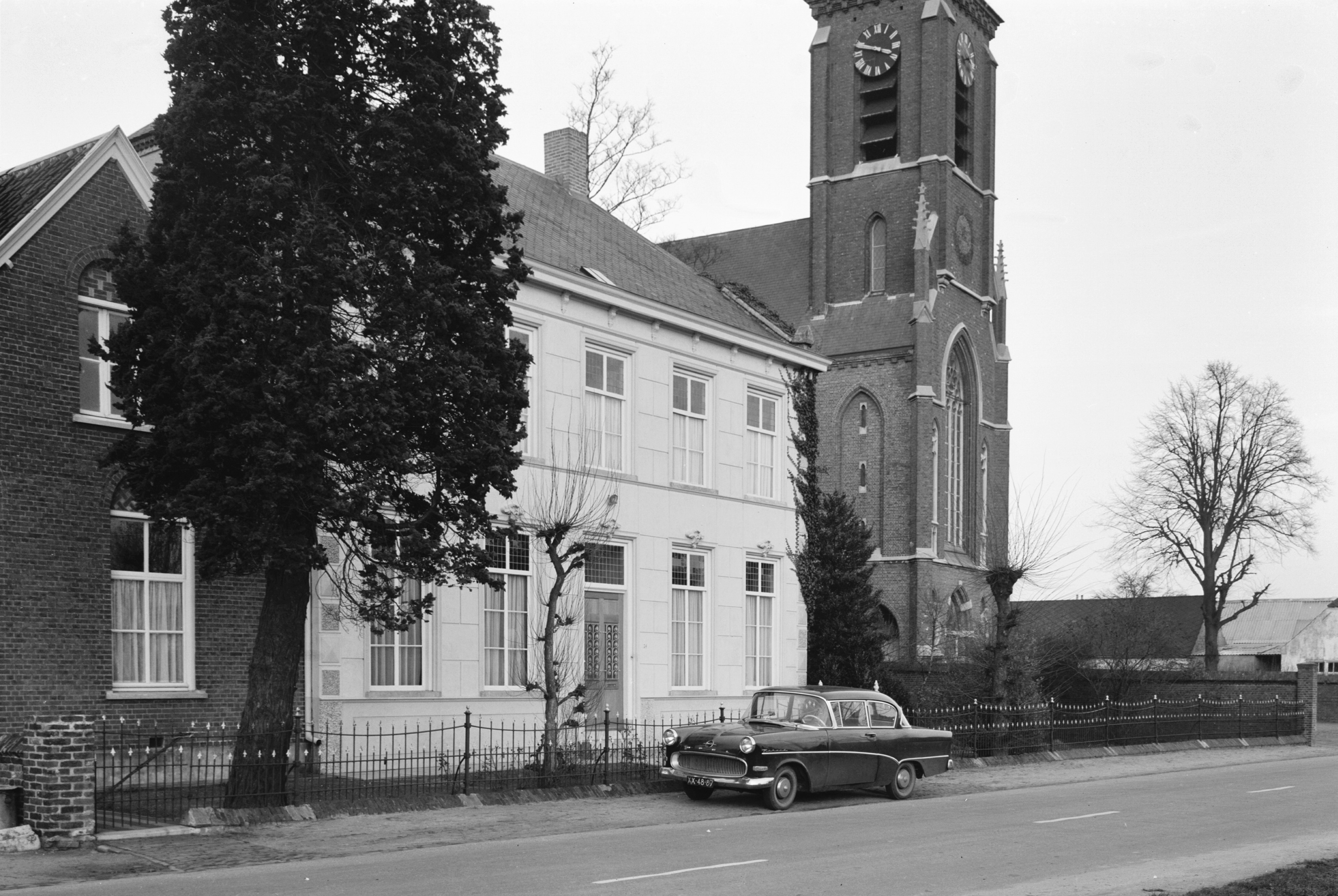
- Street of Westerhoven

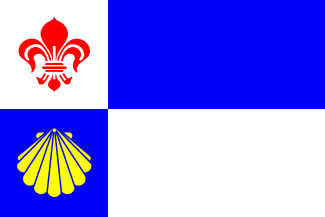
- Flag Coat of arms

- Location within North Brabant Location within Netherlands Location within Europe
- Coordinates: 51°19′58″N 5°23′53″E
- Country: Netherlands
- Province: North Brabant
- Municipality: Bergeijk

Population
  - Total: 2,003
- Time zone: UTC+1 (CET)
  - Summer (DST): UTC+2 (CEST)
- Postcode: 5563
- Area code: 040

Westerhoven is a village in the Dutch province of North Brabant. It is located in the municipality of Bergeijk, about 15 km southwest of Eindhoven.

== History ==
Westerhoven lies in a valley between the rivers Keersop and Beekloop which flow just outside the centre of the village.

The hill connecting the neighbor village Riethoven dates from Roman times. Frankish ceramics have been found there.

Westerhoven used to be part of the ‘heerlijkheid’ Bergeyk but became independent in 1810. Westerhoven was a separate municipality until 1997, when it became part of Bergeijk by municipality reclassification.

A Second World War cemetery, containing graves of 220 British soldiers, was created near Westerhoven in October 1944. It is now maintained by the Commonwealth War Graves Commission.

The spoken language is Kempenlands (an East Brabantian dialect, which is very similar to colloquial Dutch).
