= Hoogeloon =

- Village
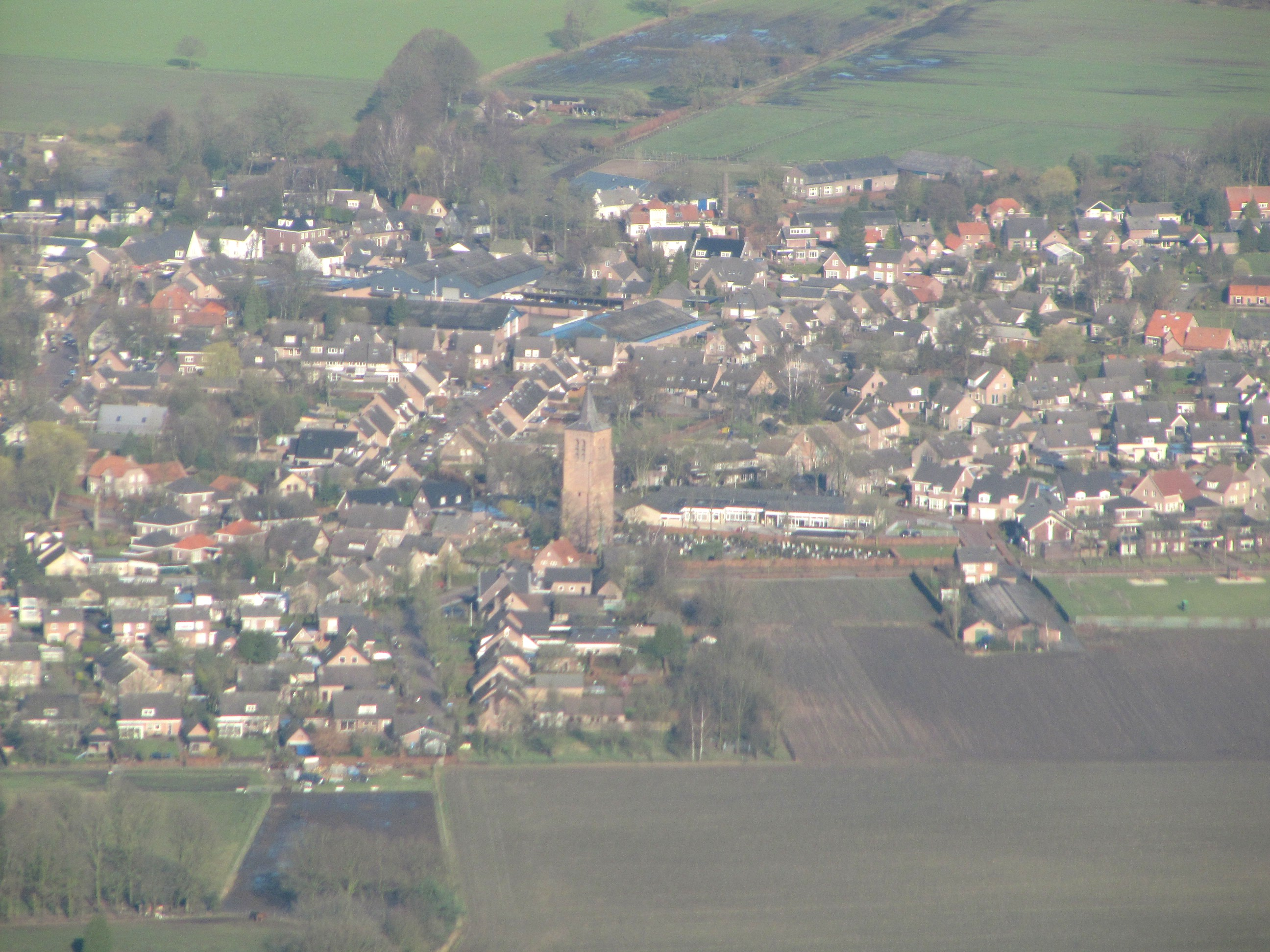
- Hoogeloon, aerial photograph

- Location in the province of North Brabant in the Netherlands Hoogeloon (Netherlands)
- Coordinates: 51°23′56″N 5°16′7″E
- Country: Netherlands
- Province: North Brabant
- Municipality: Bladel

Area
  - Total: 13.64 km^{2} (5.27 sq mi)
- Elevation: 28 m (92 ft)

Population (2021)
  - Total: 2,215
  - Density: 162.4/km^{2} (420.6/sq mi)
- Time zone: UTC+1 (CET)
  - Summer (DST): UTC+2 (CEST)
- Postal code: 5528
- Dialing code: 0497

Hoogeloon is a Dutch village in the commune of Bladel, in North Brabant. Hoogeloon is situated 4 km north of Hapert and is around 20 km west of Eindhoven.

== History ==
Close to the village of Hoogeloon there are many tumuli dating from the Bronze Age, and among the largest in Benelux. To the east of the town are the remains of a Roman villa.

Hoogeloon used to be the capital of the municipality of Hoogeloon, Hapert en Casteren. In 1997, it merged into Bladel.

The spoken language is Kempenlands (an East Brabantian dialect, which is very similar to colloquial Dutch).

An Ancient Roman mixing tap has been found at Hoogeloon.

== Gallery ==
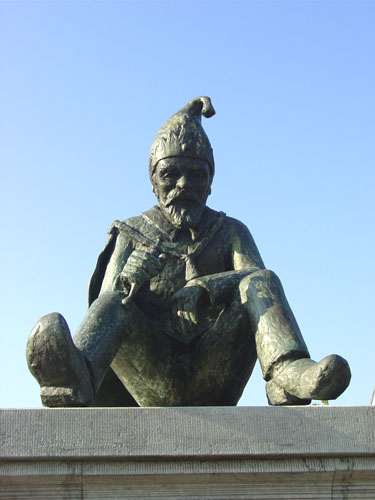
King Kyrié, King of the kabouters, sits in the central square of Hoogeloon

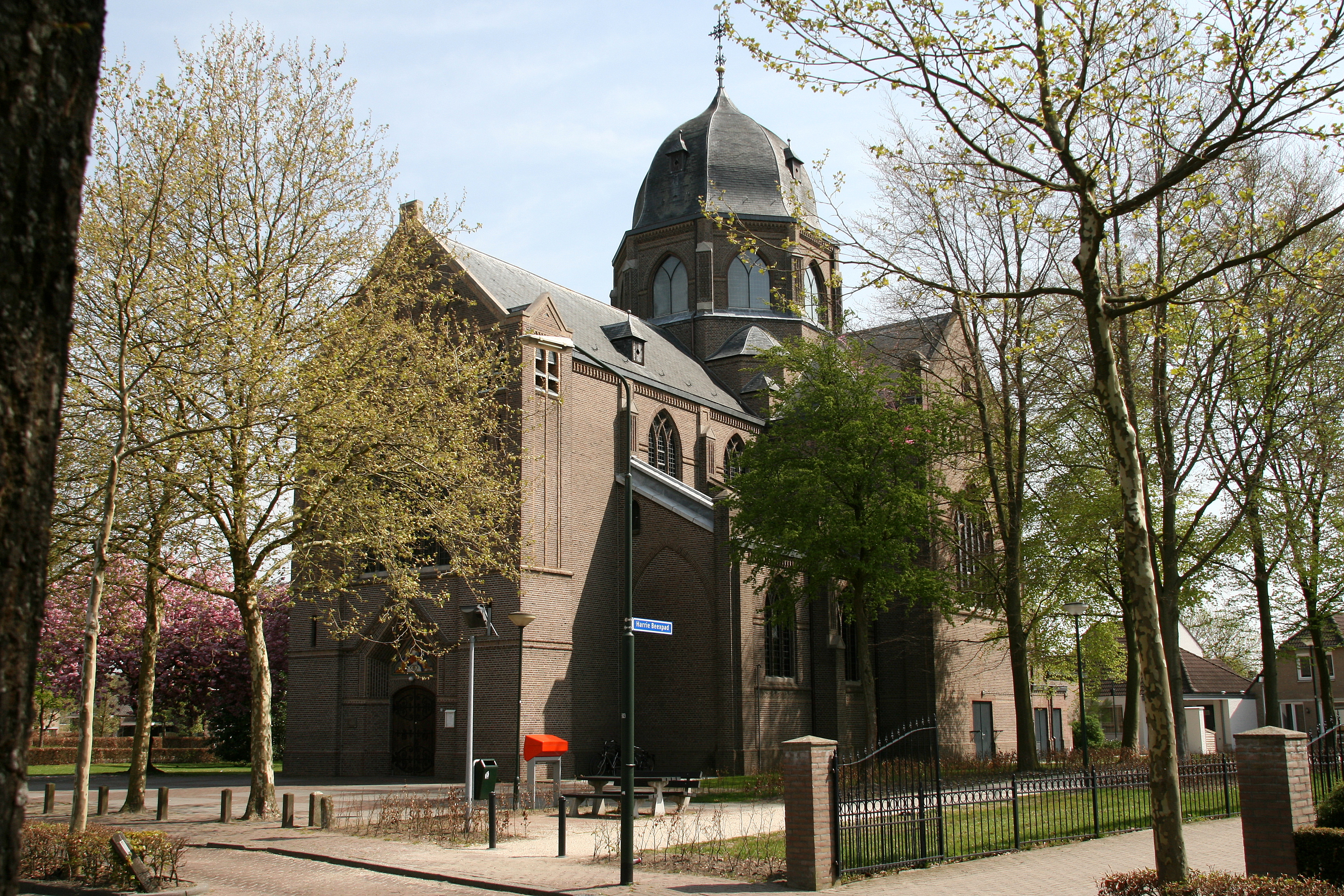
St Pancratius Church

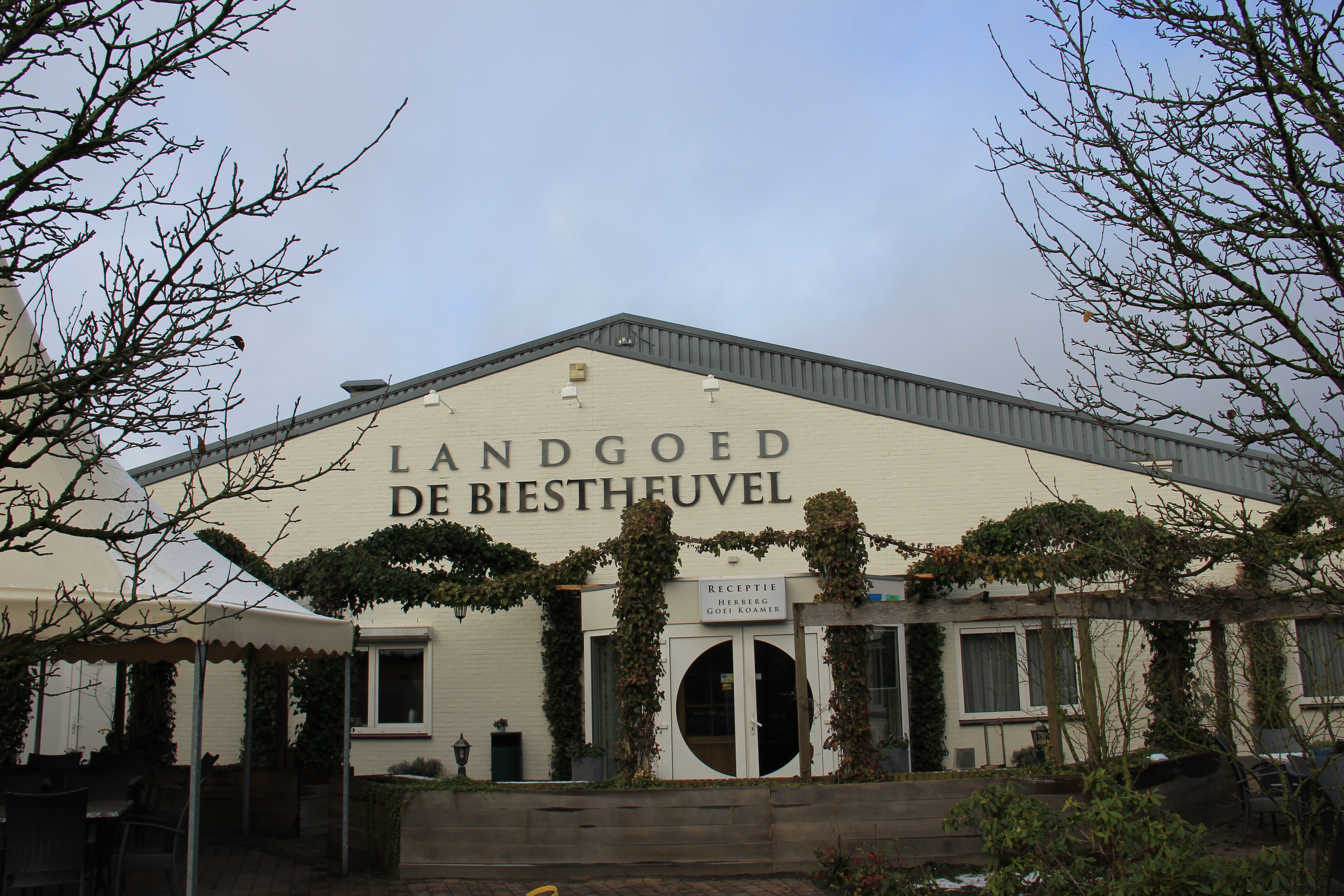
Landgoed de Biestheuvel

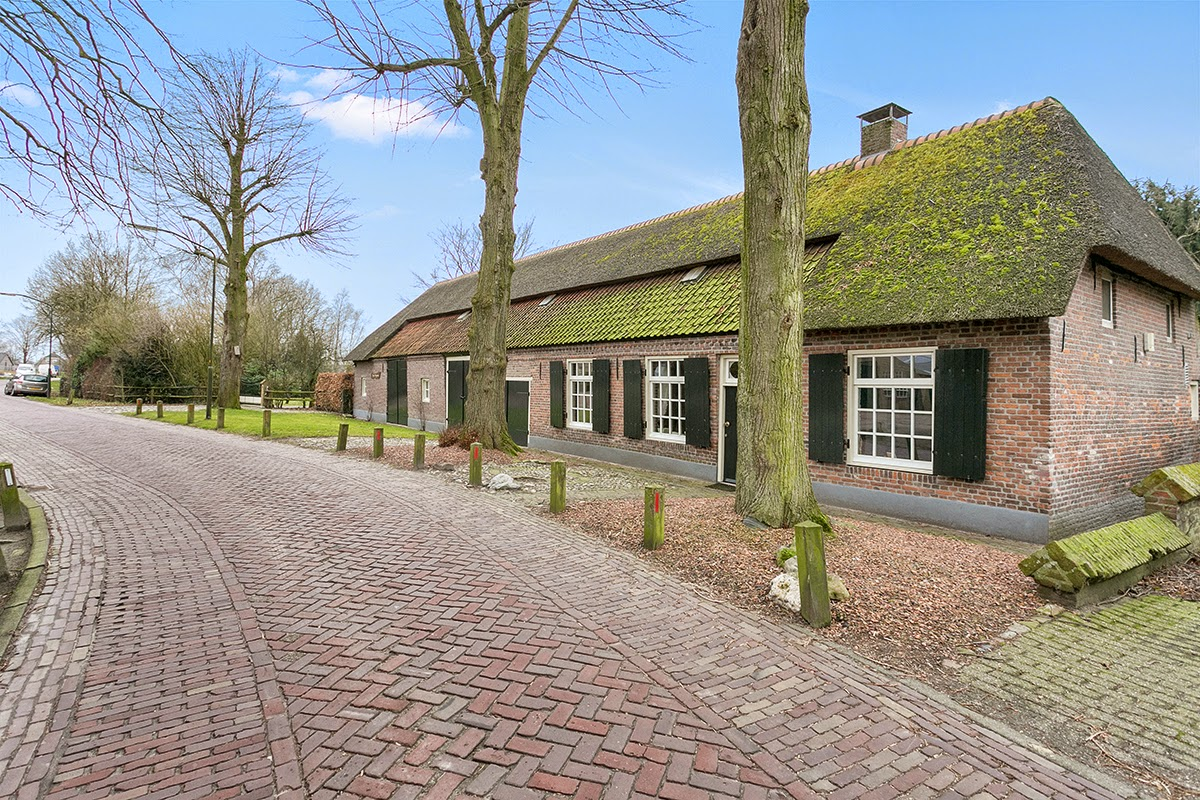
Farm in Hoogeloon
