= Bergeijk =

- Municipality
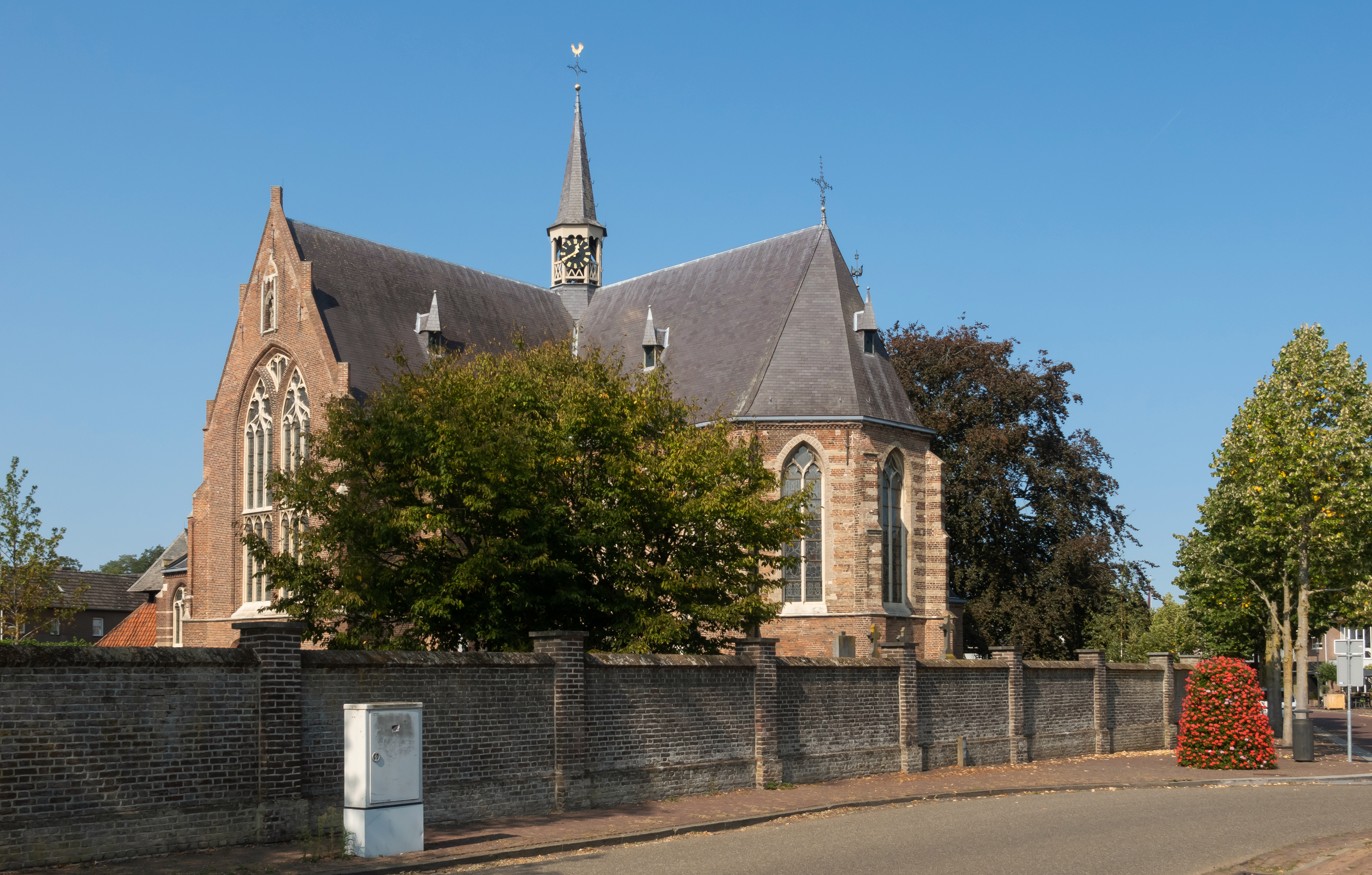
- Church of 't Hof, Bergeijk

- Flag Coat of arms

- Location in North Brabant
- Coordinates: 51°19′N 5°21′E
- Country: Netherlands
- Province: North Brabant

Government
  - Body: Municipal council
  - Mayor: Wilma Delissen-van Tongerlo (VVD)

Area
  - Total: 101.75 km^{2} (39.29 sq mi)
  - Land: 101.00 km^{2} (39.00 sq mi)
  - Water: 0.75 km^{2} (0.29 sq mi)
- Elevation: 32 m (105 ft)

Population (January 2021)
  - Total: 18,754
  - Density: 186/km^{2} (480/sq mi)
- Time zone: UTC+1 (CET)
  - Summer (DST): UTC+2 (CEST)
- Postcode: 5560–5575
- Area code: 040, 0497
- Website: www.bergeijk.nl

Bergeijk (Dutch: [bɛrxˈɛik] or [bɛrəxˈʔɛik]; Brabantian: Bérgààjk) is a municipality and town in southern Netherlands, in the province of North Brabant. It consists of an area of 101.75 km^{2} (39.29 sq mi) and had a population of 18,754 in 2021. It is one of 21 municipalities, including Eindhoven, that make up the Eindhoven Region Cooperative (Samenwerkingsverband Regio Eindhoven).

The spoken language is Kempenlands (an East Brabantian dialect, which is very similar to colloquial Dutch).

Bergeijk has traditionally been an agricultural area, but tourism and recreation are steadily gaining importance. Among the facilities in the municipality of Bergeijk is a bungalow park in the village Westerhoven.

Bergeijk is known in the Netherlands as a Rietveld village, for its architecture by De Stijl architect Gerrit Rietveld, and for a program on national radio: Radio Bergeijk, a parody on local radio.

== Population centres ==
- Bergeijk
- Boscheind
- Braambosch
- Hof
- 't Loo
- Loveren
- Luyksgestel
- Riethoven
- Rijt
- Sengelsbroek
- Walik
- Weebosch
- Westerhoven

== Topography ==
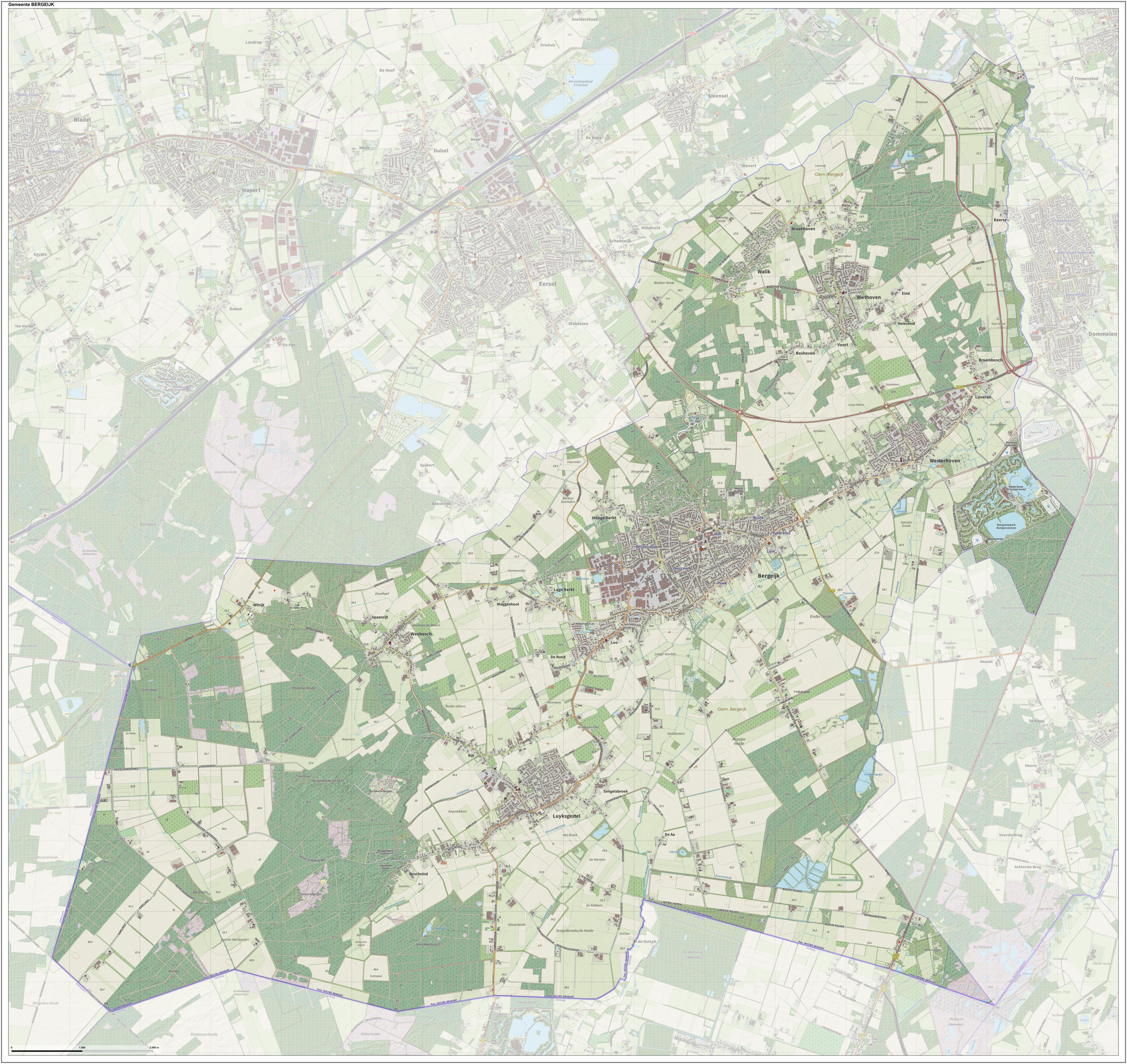

Topographic map of the municipality of Bergeijk, June 2015.

== Notable people ==
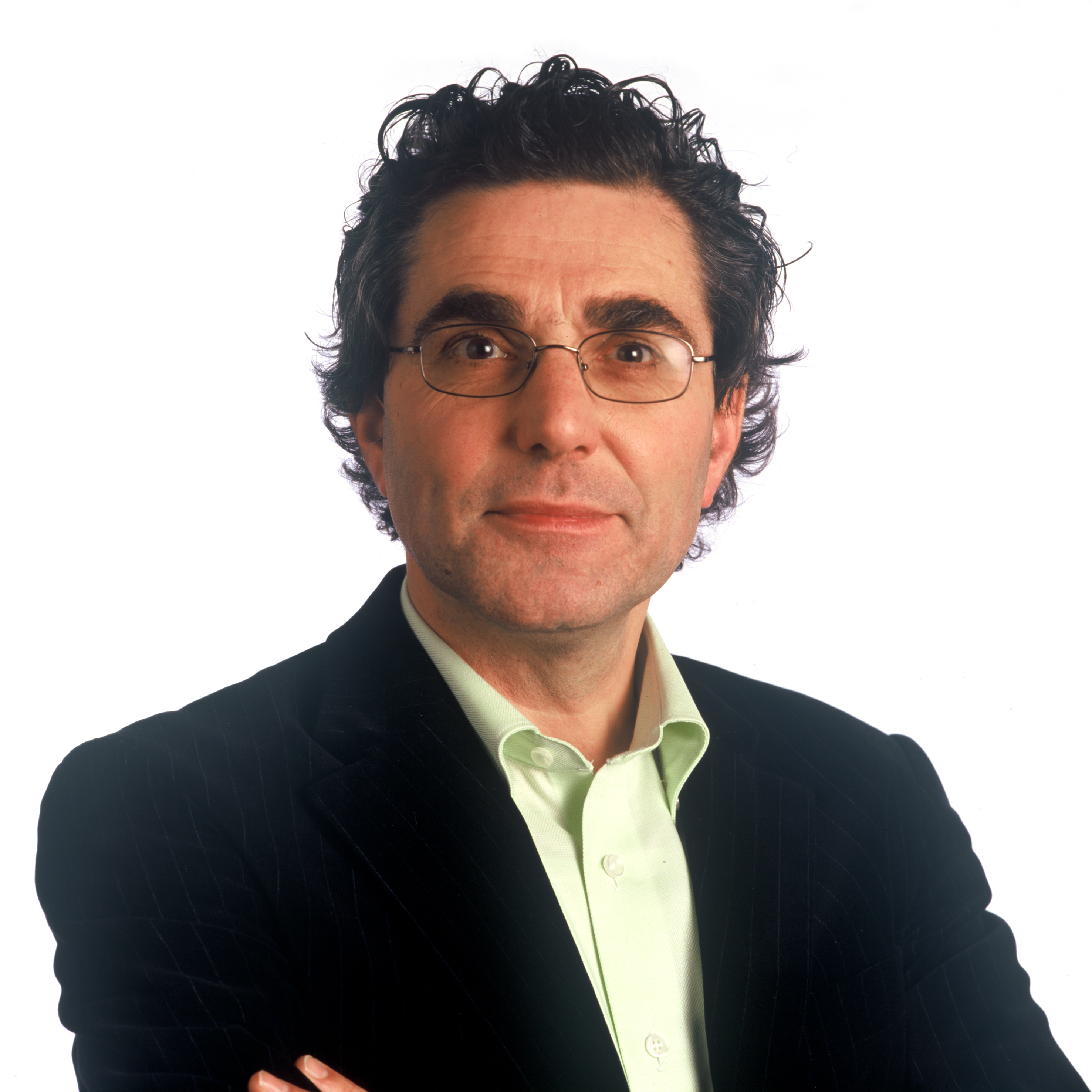
Henk van Gerven, 2008

- Henk van Gerven (born 1955 in Riethoven) a Dutch politician and general practitioner
- Wilbert Das (born 1963) a Dutch fashion designer, grew up in Riethoven

=== Sport ===
- Harm van Veldhoven (born 1962 in Luyksgestel) a Dutch-Belgian football manager
- Kees Koolen (born 1965 in Bergeijk) a Dutch rally raid racer and businessman
- Tommie van der Leegte (born 1977 in Bergeijk) a retired Dutch footballer with 334 club caps
- Rudi van Houts (born 1984 in Luyksgestel) a Dutch road cyclist and mountain biker, competed in the 2008 and 2012 Summer Olympics
- Harrie Lavreysen (born 1997 in Luyksgestel) five times Olympic champion in track cycling at the 2021 Summer Olympics in Tokyo and the 2024 Summer Olympics in Paris

== Gallery ==
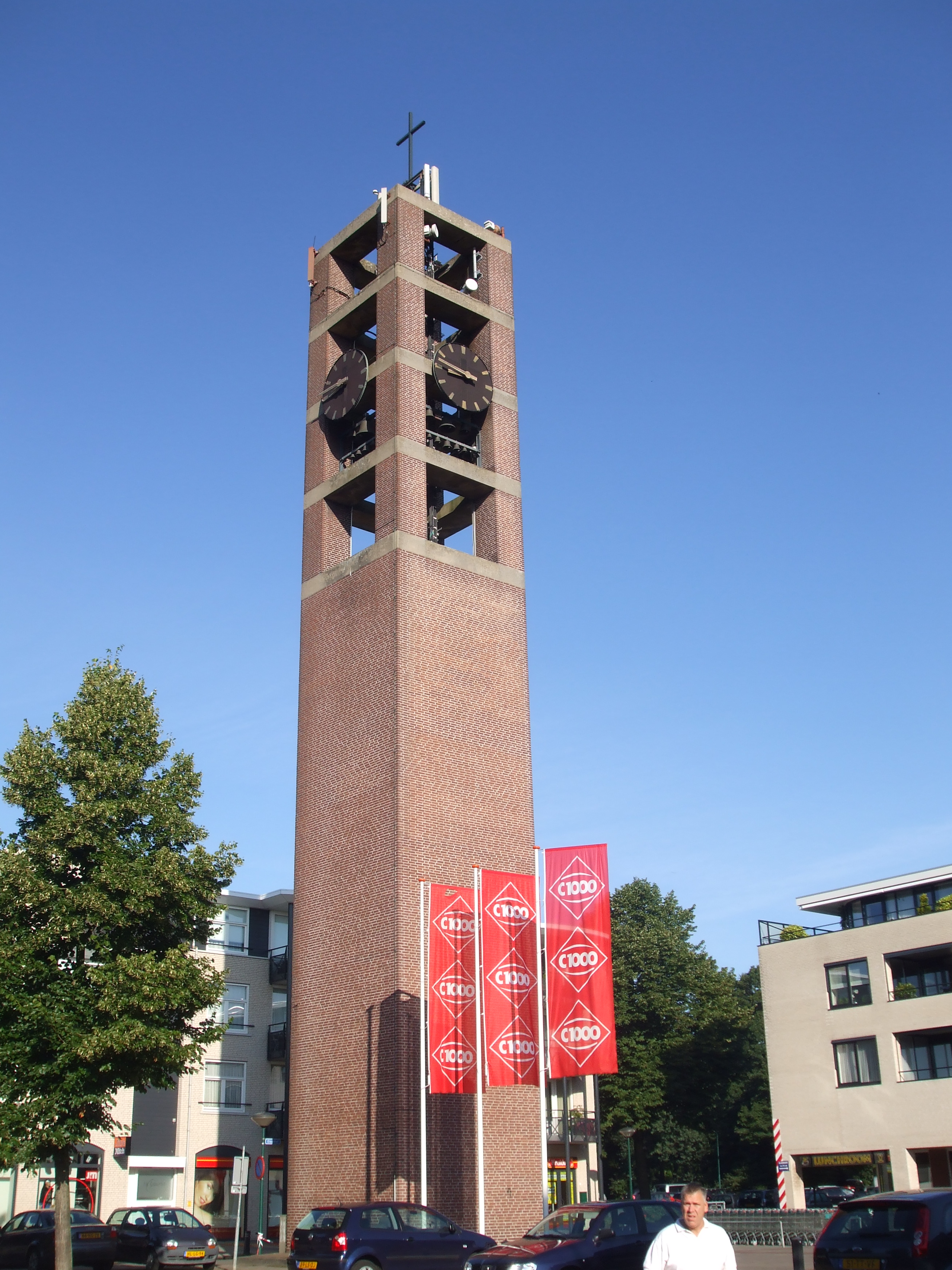
Bergeijk, clock tower

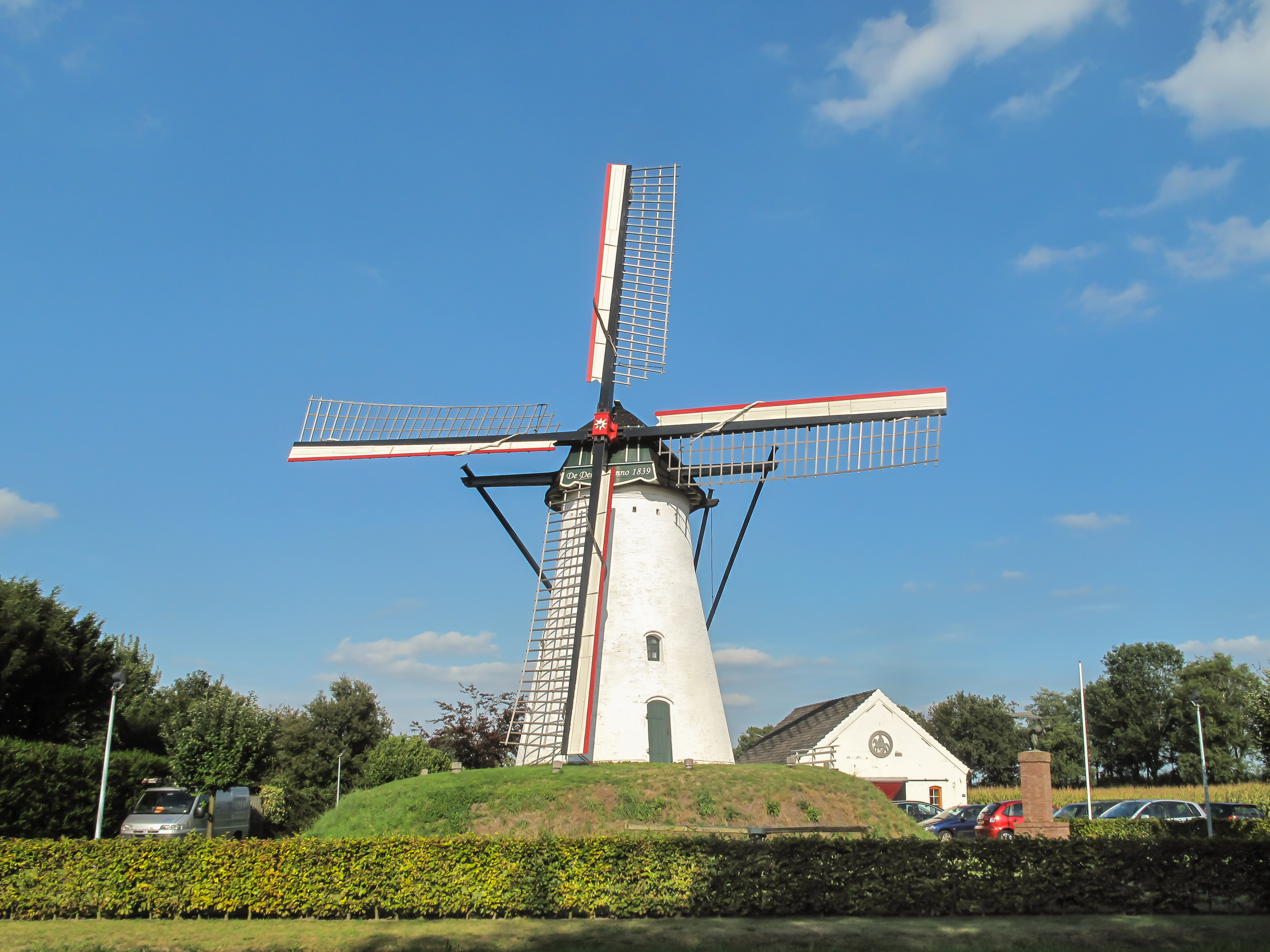
Luyksgestel, windkorenmolen, De Deen

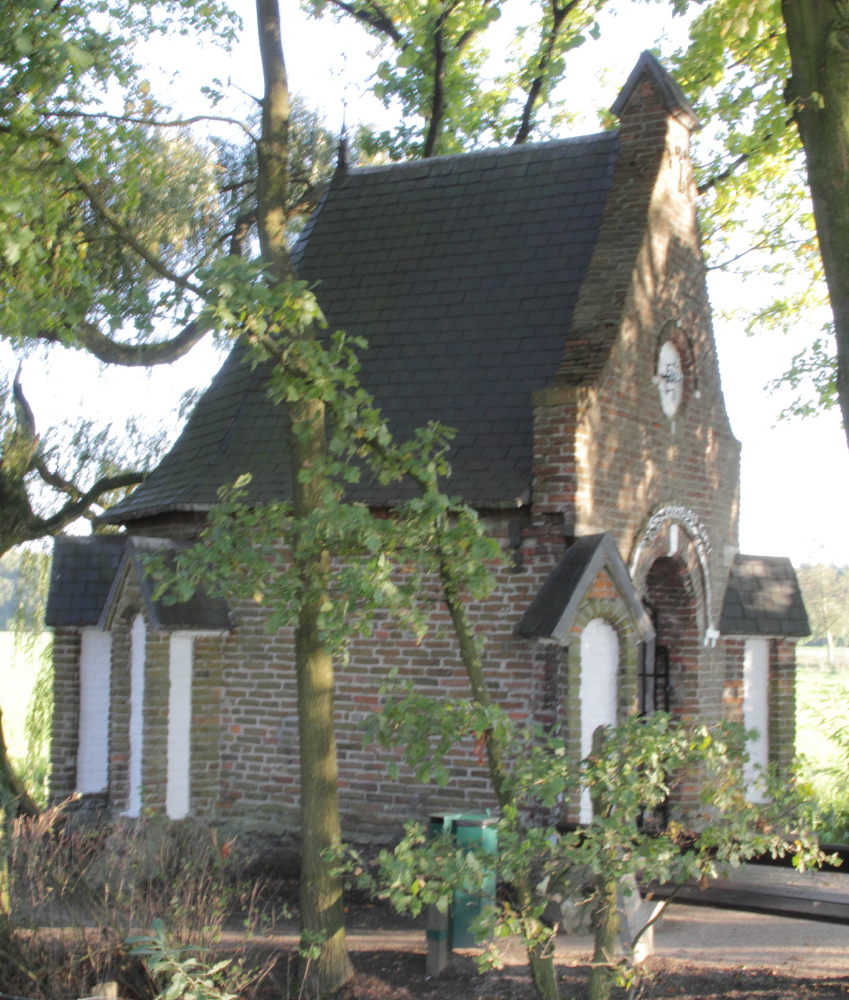
Saint Valentine Chapel Westerhoven

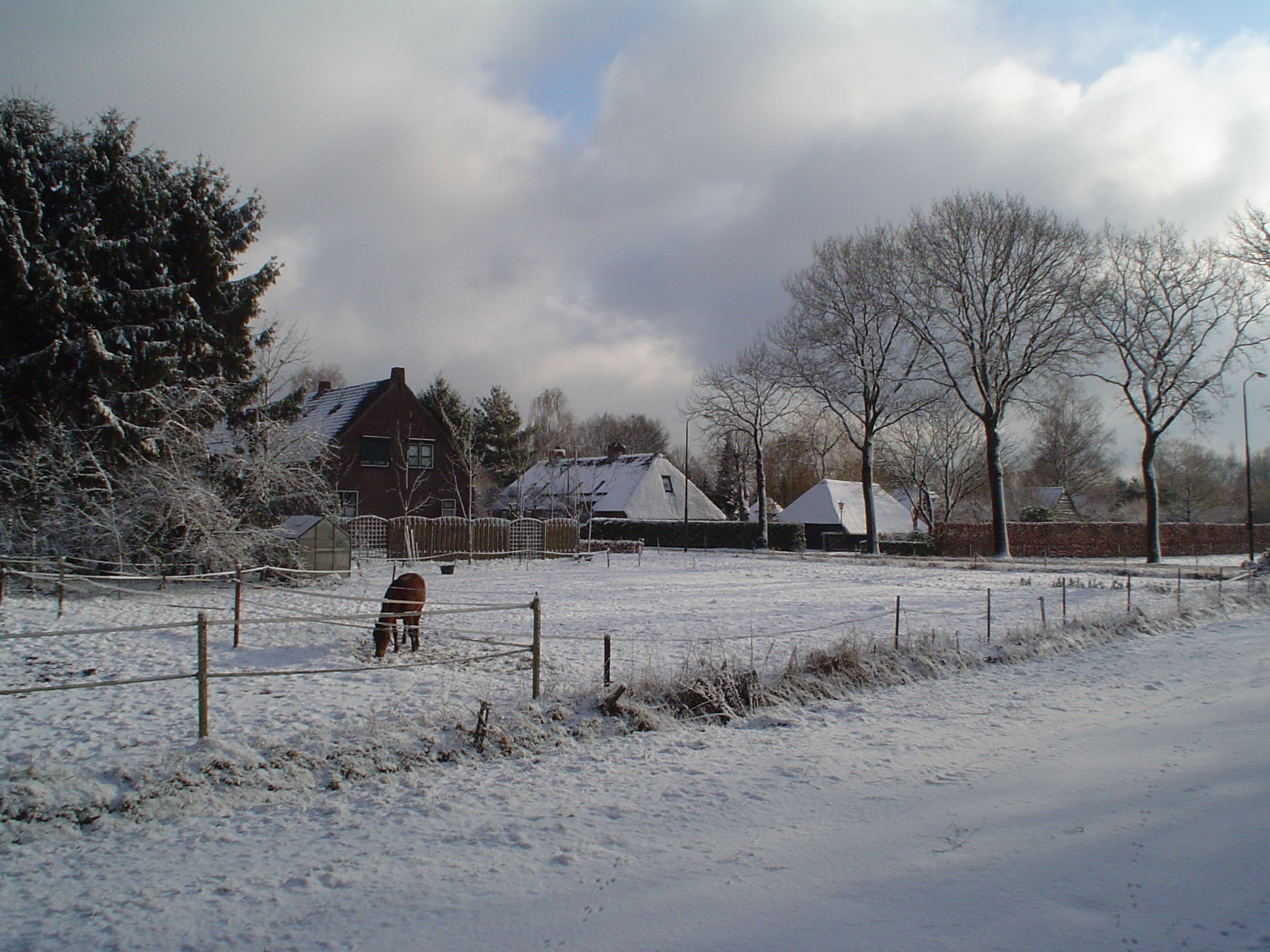
Farmhouses in winter in Broekhoven, near Riethoven
