= Hoogeloon, Hapert en Casteren =

Coordinates: 51°24′N 5°16′E

Coat of Arms

Hoogeloon, Hapert en Casteren is a former municipality in the Dutch province of North Brabant. It covered the villages of Hoogeloon, Hapert and Casteren.

Hoogeloon, Hapert en Casteren merged with Bladel en Netersel in 1997, to form the new municipality of "Bladel".
