= Moergestel =

- Village
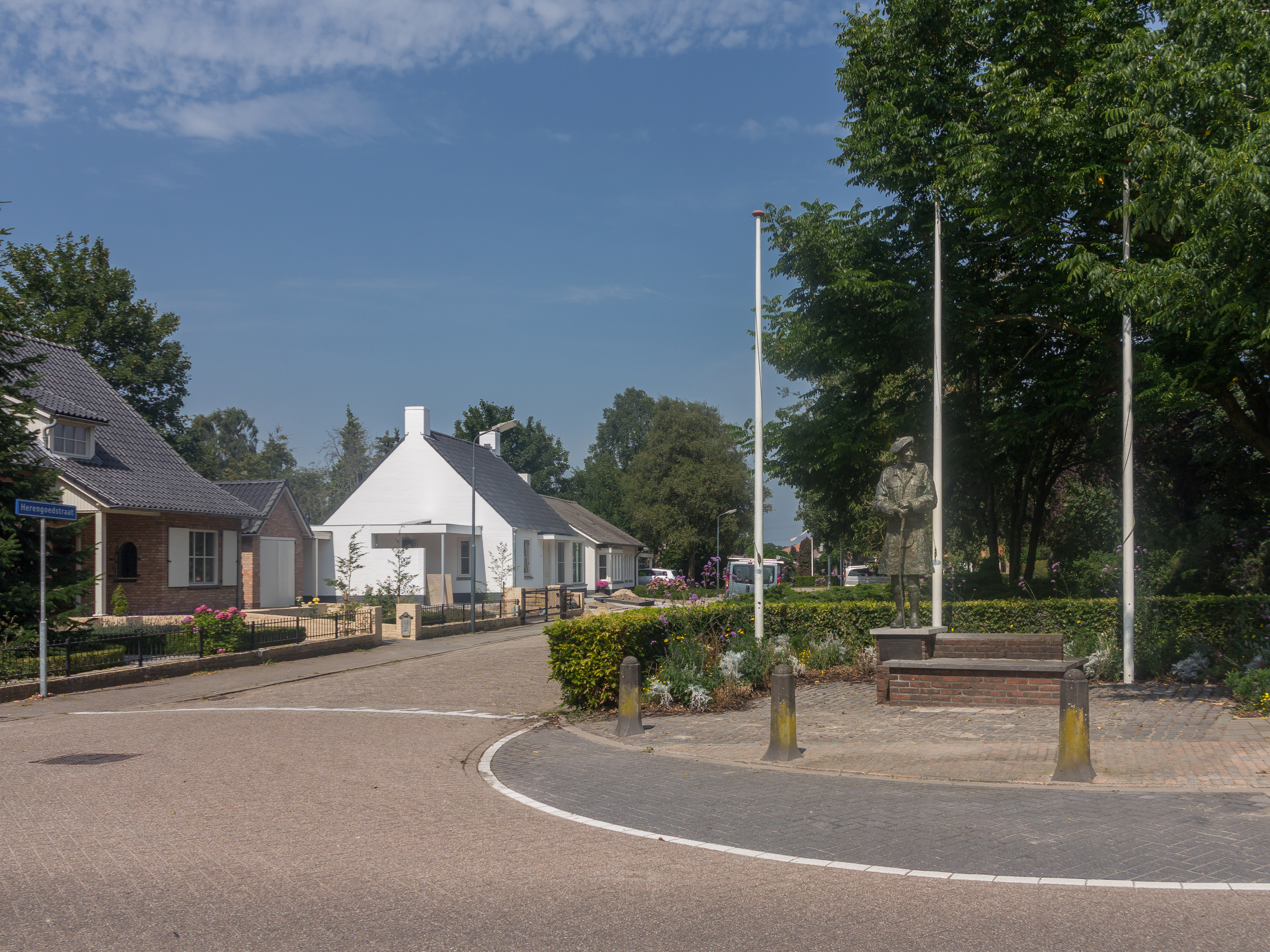
- Street view with statue of general C.M. Barber

- Coat of arms

- Location in the province of North Brabant in the Netherlands Moergestel (Netherlands)
- Coordinates: 51°33′0″N 5°11′0″E
- Country: Netherlands
- Province: North Brabant
- Municipality: Oisterwijk

Area
  - Total: 18.08 km^{2} (6.98 sq mi)
- Elevation: 11 m (36 ft)

Population (2021)
  - Total: 5,690
  - Density: 315/km^{2} (815/sq mi)
- Time zone: UTC+1 (CET)
  - Summer (DST): UTC+2 (CEST)
- Postal code: 5066
- Dialing code: 013

Moergestel (Dutch: [muːrˈɣɛstəl]) is a village in the Dutch province of North Brabant. It is located in the municipality of Oisterwijk, about 7 km East of Tilburg.

== History ==
The village was first mentioned in 1147 as Gestele, and means "guest house". Moer (moorland / peat excavation settlement) was later added to distinguish from Luyksgestel. Moergestel started on a sandy ridge near the brook Reusel. It is started to develop when the roads from Tilburg to Eindhoven and Oisterwijk to Hilvarenbeek intersected in the village.

The tower of the St John, the Baptish church dates from the 16th century. Later the church was added to the tower. Between 1930 and 1931, the church was replaced. The nameless grist mill of Moergestel was built in 1852. Some parts of the wind mill dates from around 1600. In 2010, it was restored and operates on a voluntary basis.

Moergestel was home to 389 people in 1840. Moergestel was a separate municipality until 1997, when it became part of Oisterwijk.

== Gallery ==
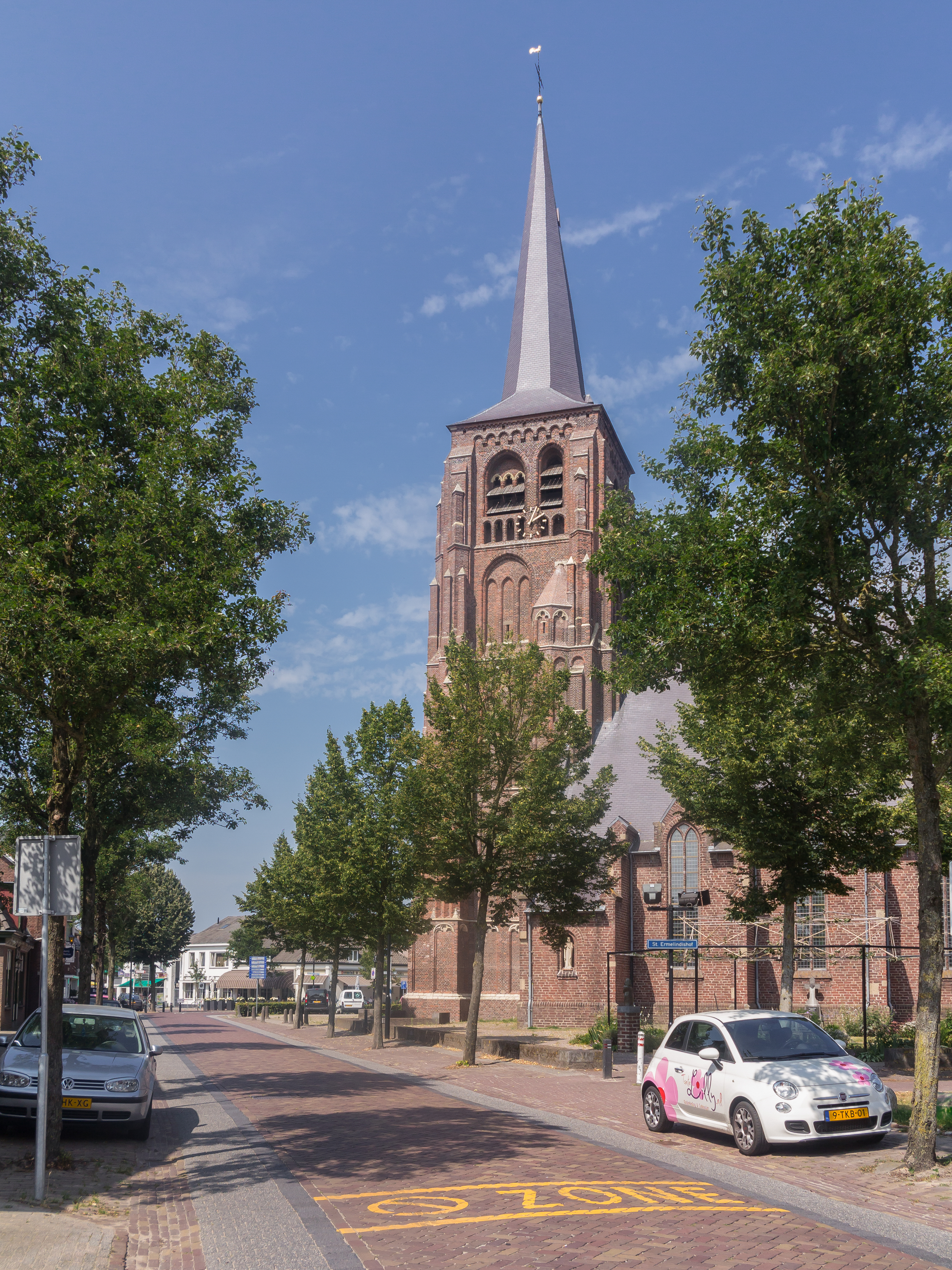
Church: de Sint Janskerk

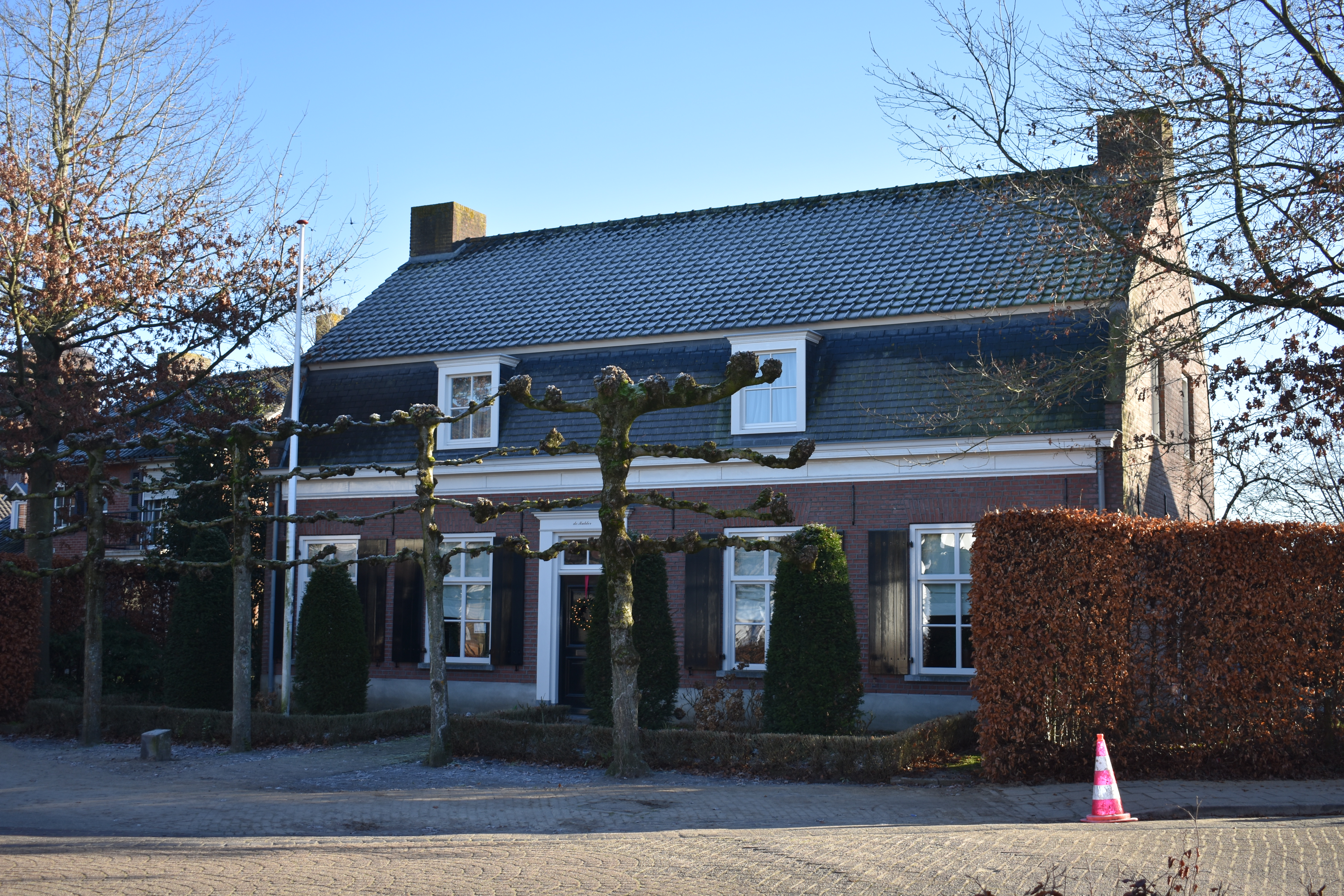
House in Moergestel

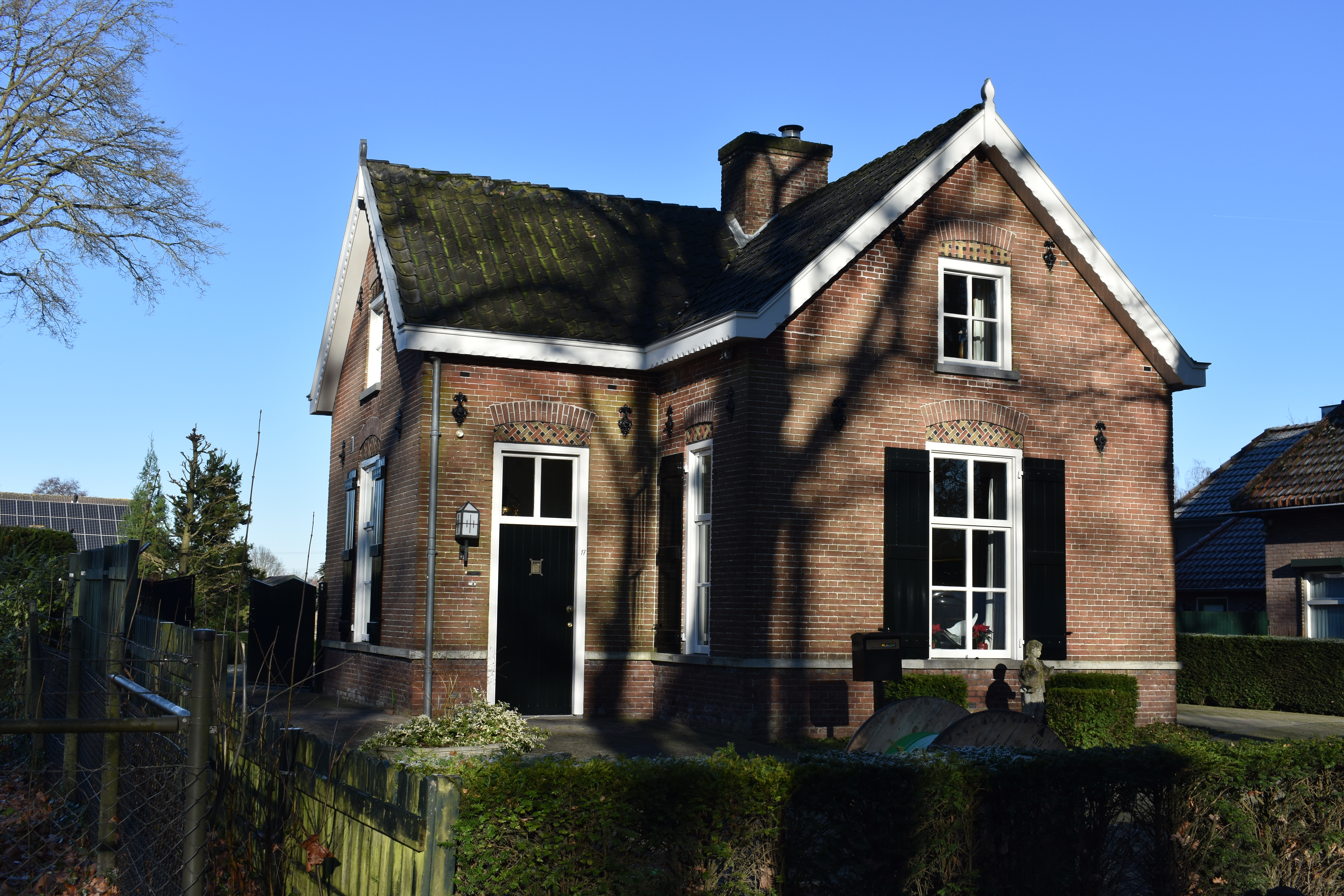
House in Moergestel

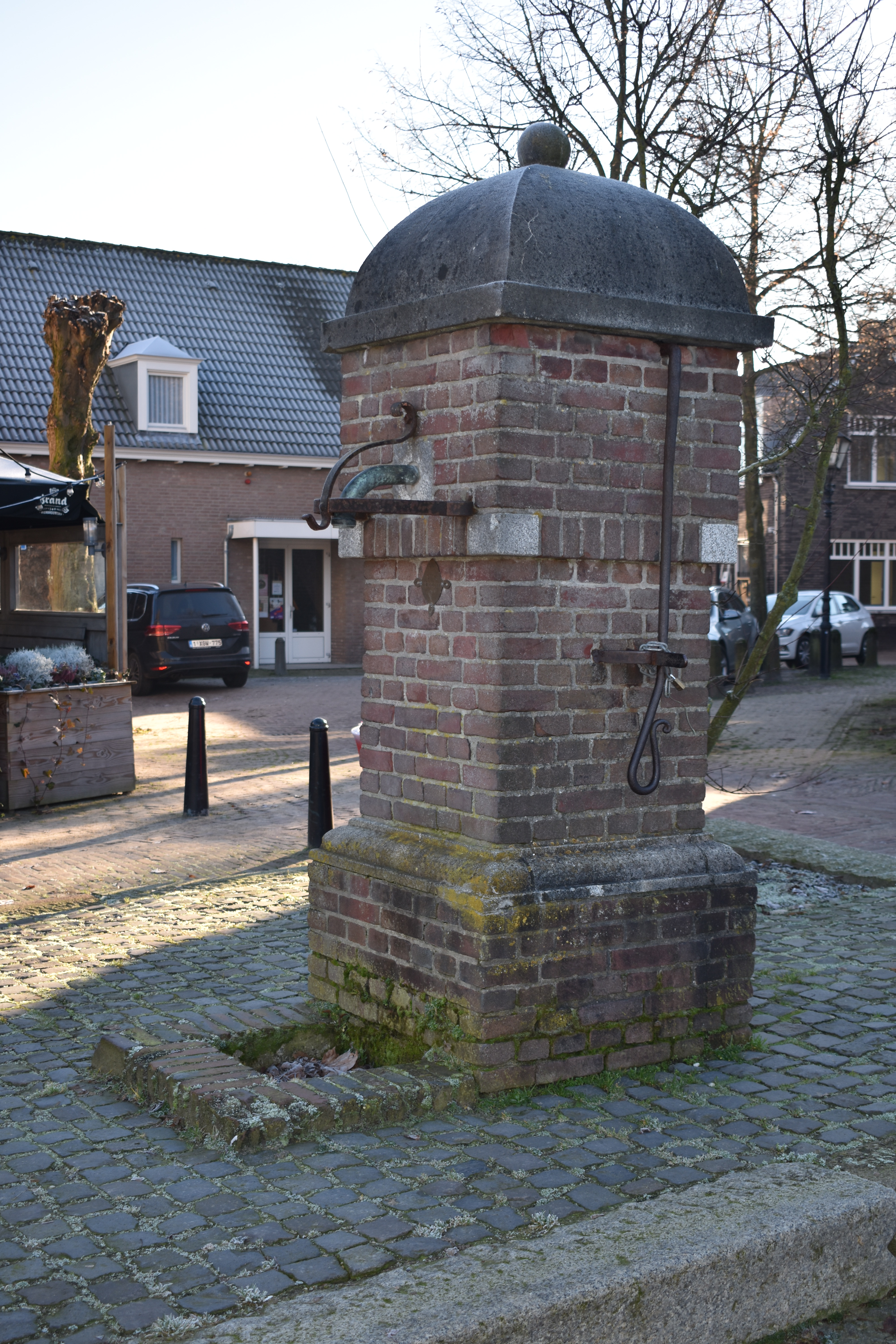
Village pump
