= Radio Bergeijk =

Radio Bergeijk is a Dutch satirical radio programme of which Peer van Eersel and Toon Spoorenberg are the anchormen. They are played by the comedians George van Houts and Pieter Bouwman respectively. The first episode was broadcast on April 3, 2001 from 00:44 AM to 01:00 AM. From then on, a new episode airs every weekday. In January 2004 there were dramatic changes in the Dutch radio programming and Radio Bergeijk was forced to broadcast just every Saturday from 13:30 to 14:00 on Radio 1.

== Subjects of the programme ==
Radio Bergeijk handles controversial subjects arising in Dutch society. Examples of the most popular subjects of the programme are the national immigration policy, health care, the elderly, the society which seems to get less and less tolerant and World War II. One could see the town of Bergeijk as a small country: everything which happens in the world also seems to happen in Bergeijk. Radio Bergeijk has elements of black humour, such as extremely unfair behaviour of the anchormen, foul language, violence and the abuse of minority groups. For instance, guests with a charitable initiative often get abused by the anchormen during an interview which often results in a fight. A second example is that the town of Bergeijk always seems to be in conflict with neighbouring towns, which sometimes results in a true battle.

The programme has several recurrent elements, such as local news, sports news, industrial news, interviews with politicians, live coverage on remarkable events and many more. These elements of the programme are always the same and seem to have strict rules. This gives the listener a grip on the presentation style so that he can focus on the content of the programme. Sometimes, this presentation style is dropped and a major event happens live: the army of Bergeijk is sent to Bosnia and practices in Bergeijk for experience, the anchormen are mixed up in a fiery argument and one threatens to commit suicide, a group of women violently rob every man in the city, the anchormen die and are sent to the heavenly gate where they meet God, et cetera. Almost every episode have short-term items (stand-alone gags), medium-term items (single references to shows in the past or the future) and long-term items which last several episodes.

== Characters appearing in the programme ==
- Peer van Eersel and Toon Spoorenberg are two divorced, old-fashioned, middle-aged men who illegally live on disability insurance benefit and voluntarily work as radio producers. They often suffer from midlife crisis and hark back to the good old days as they cannot keep up with modern developments. They have a very determined, twisted, selfish, old-fashioned and short-sighted view on the subjects they discuss, always taking (without knowing) the opposite stand. Their popularity in the town is almost nil, but they nevertheless fulfil their "duty".
- Ted van Lieshout is the technician who takes care of the (fictional) broadcasting and the equipment. Although he can never be heard on the programme, he plays an important role in the show. The anchormen have brief conversations with him, but only by microphone and headphone, so the listener never hears his voice. Tedje is the one who picks the music which must be relevant to the subjects of the show. The broadcast always gives an awkward impression, because Tedje forgets to close the microphone and the listeners can hear private (and not too pleasant) conversations between Peer and Toon. This is often not noticed by Peer and Toon, but when it is, it results in an embarrassing situation (and a fight).
- Beeks. Owner of the favourite bar of Peer and Toon. He is shy but always relatively popular with the anchormen, because he supplies the drinks (gin with a chaser). Peer and Toon always have a great debt with this man.
- Theo van Deursen. Citizen of Bergeijk. He always has great (but not always charitable) initiatives. He is a regular guest at the programme.
- Von Hunstädt. A German veteran. Very popular with the anchormen.
- Bets van Loon. The cleaning lady. She always leaves a strange message on the answering machine.
- et cetera. The programme has tens of very developed and very different characters which return on a regular basis.

== Radio Bergeijk and Bergeijk ==
Bergeijk is a town in the southern part of the Netherlands, close to the border of Belgium. The entire content of the programme is fictitious, but often based on real events, places and people. Actual details such as street names, local stores and characteristics of the surrounding area of Bergeijk are used as an inspiration for the radio programme. (For example, the name of the anchormen's favourite bar is Café Beeks, which actually exists in a neighbouring town.) But on a larger scale, the actual subjects are based on national and international events.

== In other media ==
The radio show was adapted into a celebrity comics series by Jeroen de Leijer.
