= Bladel en Netersel =

Coordinates: 51°23′N 5°13′E

Bladel en Netersel is a former municipality in the Dutch province of North Brabant. It covered the villages of Bladel and Netersel.

Bladel en Netersel merged with Hoogeloon, Hapert en Casteren in 1997, to form the new municipality of "Bladel".
