= Tommie van der Leegte =

Dutch footballer (born 1977)

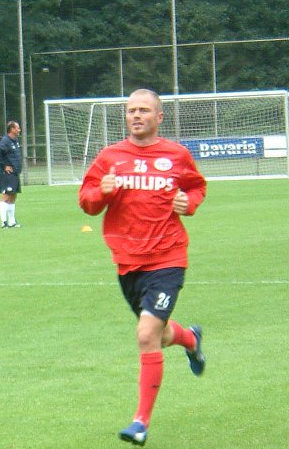
- Van der Leegte with PSV in 2008

Personal information
- Date of birth: 27 March 1977 (age 49)
- Place of birth: Bergeijk, Netherlands
- Height: 1.79 m (5 ft 10 in)
- Position: Defensive midfielder

Youth career
- 1983–1988: RKVV EMK
- 1988–1994: PSV

Senior career*
Years	Team	Apps	(Gls)
1994–1997	PSV	30	(1)
1997	→ RKC (loan)	12	(0)
1997–2000	RKC	68	(8)
2000–2003	Twente	58	(6)
2003	→ RKC (loan)	11	(0)
2003–2006	ADO Den Haag	80	(3)
2006–2007	VfL Wolfsburg	45	(0)
2007–2008	PSV	2	(0)
2008–2010	NAC Breda	28	(0)
Total		334	(18)

International career
1991	Netherlands U16	3	(0)
1992–1993	Netherlands U17	8	(2)
1994	Netherlands U18	1	(0)
1994–1995	Netherlands U19	10	(4)
1995–2000	Netherlands U21	14	(0)
- * Club domestic league appearances and goals

Tommie van der Leegte (born 27 March 1977) is a Dutch former professional footballer who played as a defensive midfielder. A former youth international, he represented clubs including PSV and VfL Wolfsburg.

== Club career ==
=== Early life, family and education ===
Van der Leegte was born on 27 March 1977 in Bergeijk, North Brabant, Netherlands, and later moved with his family to Nuenen, where he grew up just 300 meters from the local football club RKVV EMK. His father, Piet, who died in a car accident when Tommie was six years old, was a coach at the club. Under his father's influence, Van der Leegte developed a passion for football, beginning to train unofficially at the age of five and joining RKVV EMK's youth teams soon after. Despite his young age, he quickly excelled, playing as a midfielder and forward and contributing significantly to his teams.

At the age of 11, Van der Leegte joined PSV Eindhoven's youth academy, having been scouted by Gerrit van Tilburg. Although PSV had shown interest earlier, his mother initially preferred for him to stay at RKVV EMK to enjoy playing with friends. Encouraged by both Van Tilburg and Adrie van Kraay, a PSV youth coach and family acquaintance, Van der Leegte eventually made the move.

Academically, Van der Leegte struggled, prioritising football over studies. After repeating two years in secondary school (MAVO), he left formal education at 17 to focus on his professional football career, having already signed his first youth contract with PSV at 15 and a professional contract at 17.

=== PSV ===
Van der Leegte joined PSV Eindhoven's youth academy at the age of 11, progressing through the ranks from the under-12 team to the under-19 team. Initially playing as a left winger, forward, or attacking midfielder, he later transitioned to a defensive midfield role. During his time in the youth setup, he played alongside future professionals such as Björn van der Doelen, Boudewijn Zenden, and Fernando Derveld, under coaches including Huub Stevens, Adrie van Kraay, and Robert Verbeek.

He made his first-team debut for PSV on 26 November 1994, at the age of 17, playing the full match in a 0–0 draw against FC Volendam under interim manager Kees Rijvers.

In his early seasons with PSV, Van der Leegte trained and played alongside established players such as Luc Nilis, Arthur Numan, and Ronaldo. Initially overawed by the presence of these high-profile teammates, he gradually integrated into the squad, with Numan providing mentorship to younger players. Van der Leegte primarily featured as a substitute under managers Kees Rijvers and Dick Advocaat, who had also previously named him captain of the Netherlands U18 team.

Injury to Arthur Numan briefly forced Van der Leegte into the unfamiliar role of left-back, a position he found challenging. While PSV won the KNVB Cup in the 1995–96 season, Van der Leegte played a limited role, often serving as a reserve. Nevertheless, he participated in the celebrations following the team's victory.

=== RKC Waalwijk ===
In November 1996, almost halfway through the 1996–97 season, Van der Leegte was loaned to RKC Waalwijk from PSV Eindhoven. While no purchase option was included in the loan, his performances impressed, earning praise from players such as Phillip Cocu. Despite rejoining PSV for pre-season training, limited opportunities led to a permanent transfer to RKC ahead of the 1997–98 season.

At RKC, Van der Leegte transitioned into a defensive midfield role under coach Martin Jol, who was instrumental in shaping his playing style. He credited his time at the club with helping him develop resilience and adaptability, particularly through the demands of relegation battles. RKC finished 16th in the Eredivisie in three consecutive seasons before improving to 11th in 1999–2000.

During his four seasons with RKC, Van der Leegte played alongside notable teammates, including Marcel Brands and Dennis Rommedahl, and described the club as a close-knit and welcoming environment.

=== Twente ===
In the 2000–01 season, he transferred to Twente for 4 million guilders (approximately €1.8 million), where he played two seasons. During his third season, he returned to RKC Waalwijk on loan, finishing the campaign there.

=== ADO Den Haag ===
In the summer of 2003, he joined ADO Den Haag.

=== VfL Wolfsburg ===
Midway through the 2005–06 season, Van der Leegte moved to VfL Wolfsburg, where he teamed up with fellow Dutch players Kevin Hofland and Rick Hoogendorp.

=== Return to PSV ===
In May 2007, speculation linked him to a return to PSV as Phillip Cocu's successor. Shortly after, he signed a two-year contract with PSV.

=== NAC Breda ===
In September 2008, he joined NAC Breda on a two-year deal.

Van der Leegte retired in March 2010 due to persistent injuries, ending a 16-year professional career.

== International career ==
Van de Leegte represented the Netherlands at youth international levels, playing for the under-18s at the 1995 UEFA European Under-18 Championship and the under-21s at the 2000 UEFA European Under-21 Championship.

== Post-playing career ==
After football, he worked in the family business VDL Groep and owned various companies. In 2017, he suffered a brain hemorrhage.

In 2018, Van der Leegte revealed that he had been detained in Orange County jail, due to passport issues during a trip to Miami. A missing page in his passport and photos from a prior trip to Iraq raised suspicions, leading to hours of interrogation and incarceration. Van der Leegte described the experience as terrifying, with nearly 40 hours without food or sleep, before being released and sent back to the Netherlands.

In 2021 he became team manager at FC Eindhoven.

== Honours ==
PSV

- Eredivisie: 1996–97, 2007–08
- KNVB Cup: 1995–96
- Johan Cruyff Shield: 1997

Twente

- KNVB Cup: 2000–01
