= Luyksgestel =

- Village
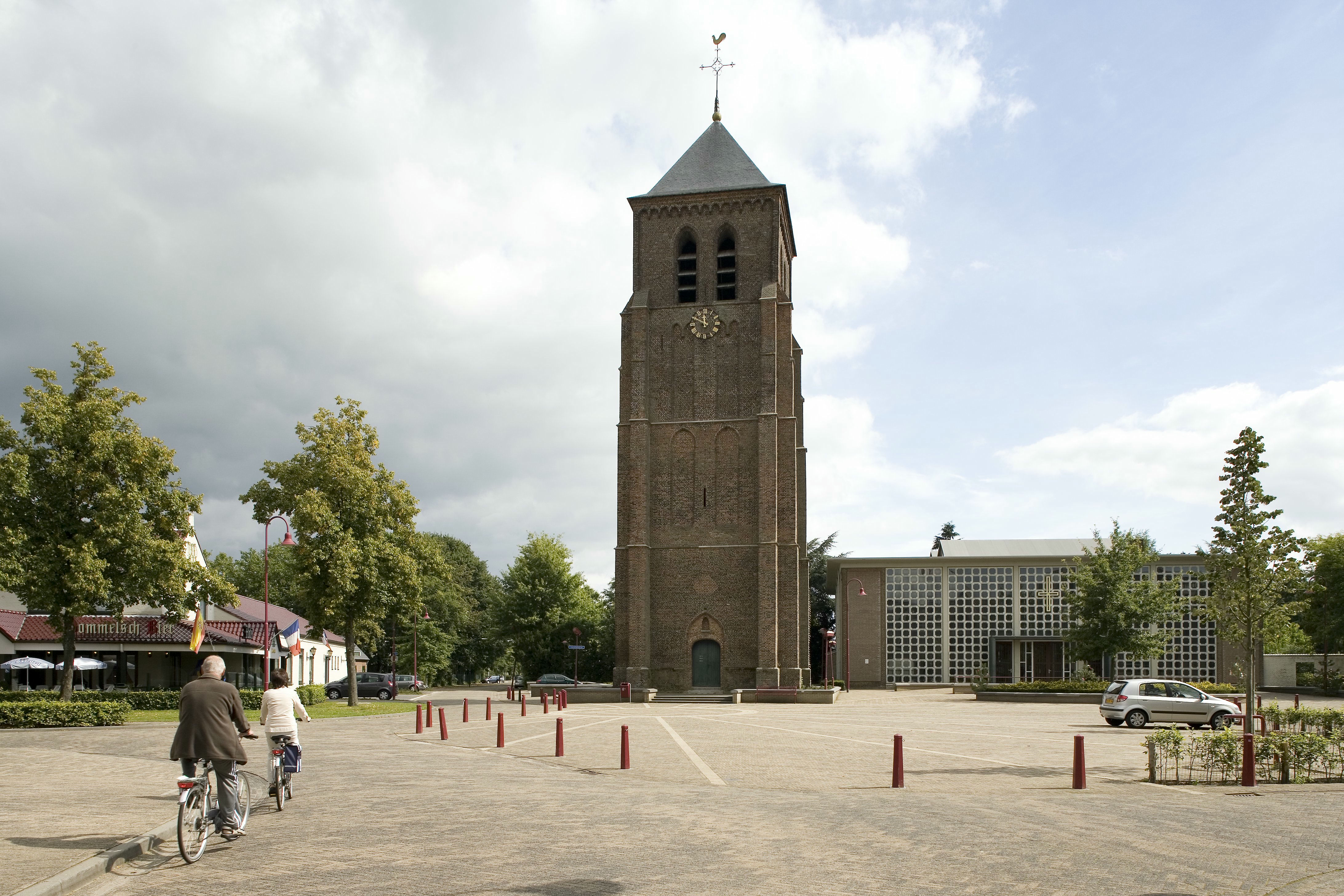
- Church of Luyksgestel

- Flag Coat of arms

- Location within North Brabant Location within Netherlands Location within Europe
- Coordinates: 51°17′24″N 5°19′26″E
- Country: Netherlands
- Province: North Brabant
- Municipality: Bergeijk

Area
  - Total: 1.28 km^{2} (0.49 sq mi)
- Elevation: 39 m (128 ft)

Population (2021)
  - Total: 2,480
  - Density: 1,940/km^{2} (5,020/sq mi)
- Time zone: UTC+1 (CET)
  - Summer (DST): UTC+2 (CEST)
- Postal code: 5575
- Dialing code: 0497

Luyksgestel (Dutch pronunciation: [ˈlœyksxɛstəl]) is a village in the Netherlands. It is located in the province of North Brabant, within the municipality of Bergeijk.

== History ==
It was first mentioned in 1343 as Gastel, and means "guest house". Luik (French: Liège) has been added to distinguish from Moergestel.

For centuries, Luyksgestel was a part of the territories of the Southern Netherlands (present-day Belgium and surroundings). Until the French revolution it was an exclave of the Bishopric of Liège. Subsequently, until 1819, it belonged to the United kingdom of the Netherlands' province of Antwerp, and only then it was transferred to where it currently belongs: the province of North Brabant, in exchange for Lommel, a neighbouring Brabantian town that was put into the province of Limburg. Luyksgestel was a separate municipality until 1997, when it became part of the municipality Bergeijk.

== People Born in Luyksgestel ==
Harrie Lavreysen

== Gallery ==
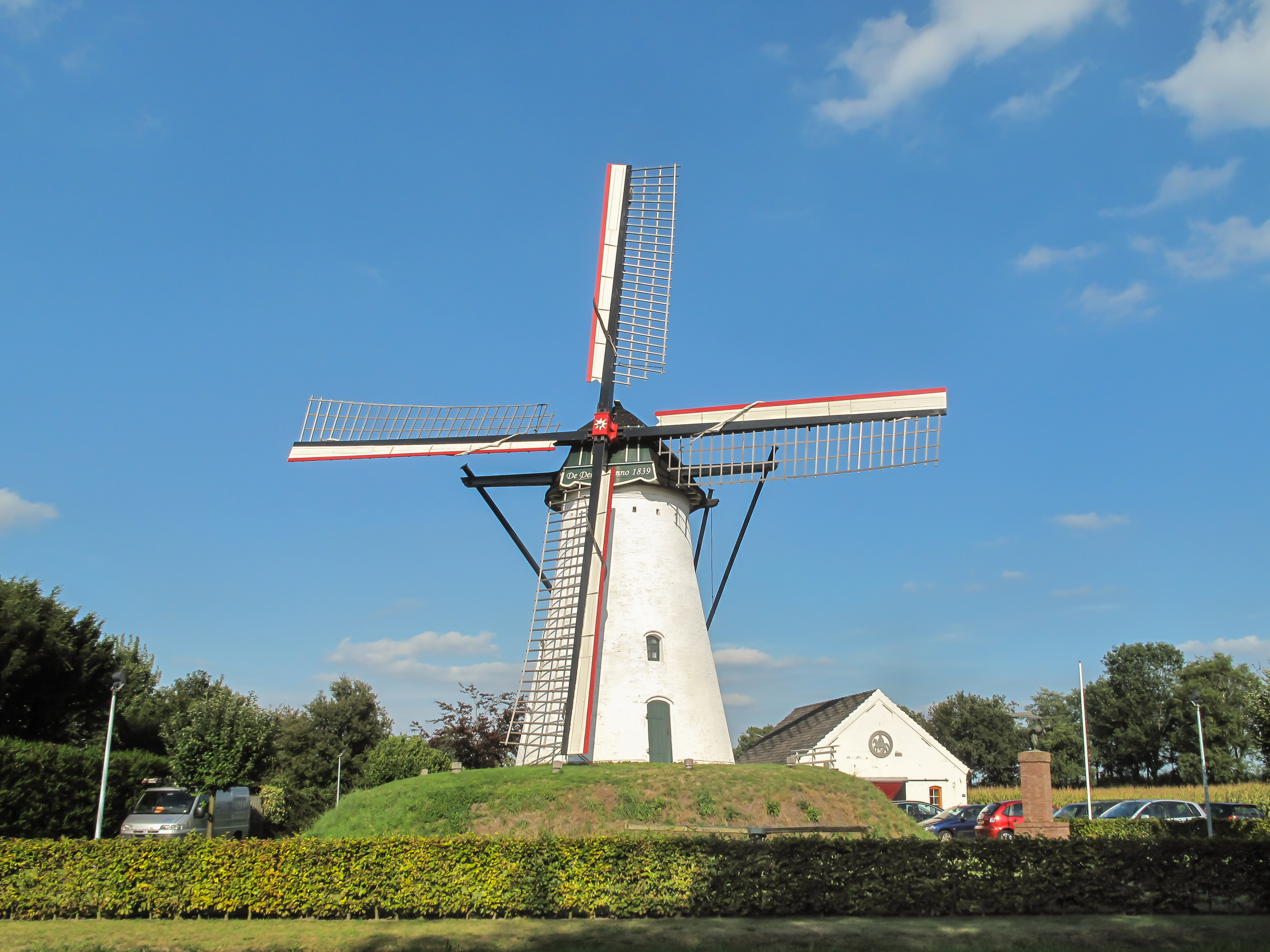
Luyksgestel, windmill: grist mill De Deen

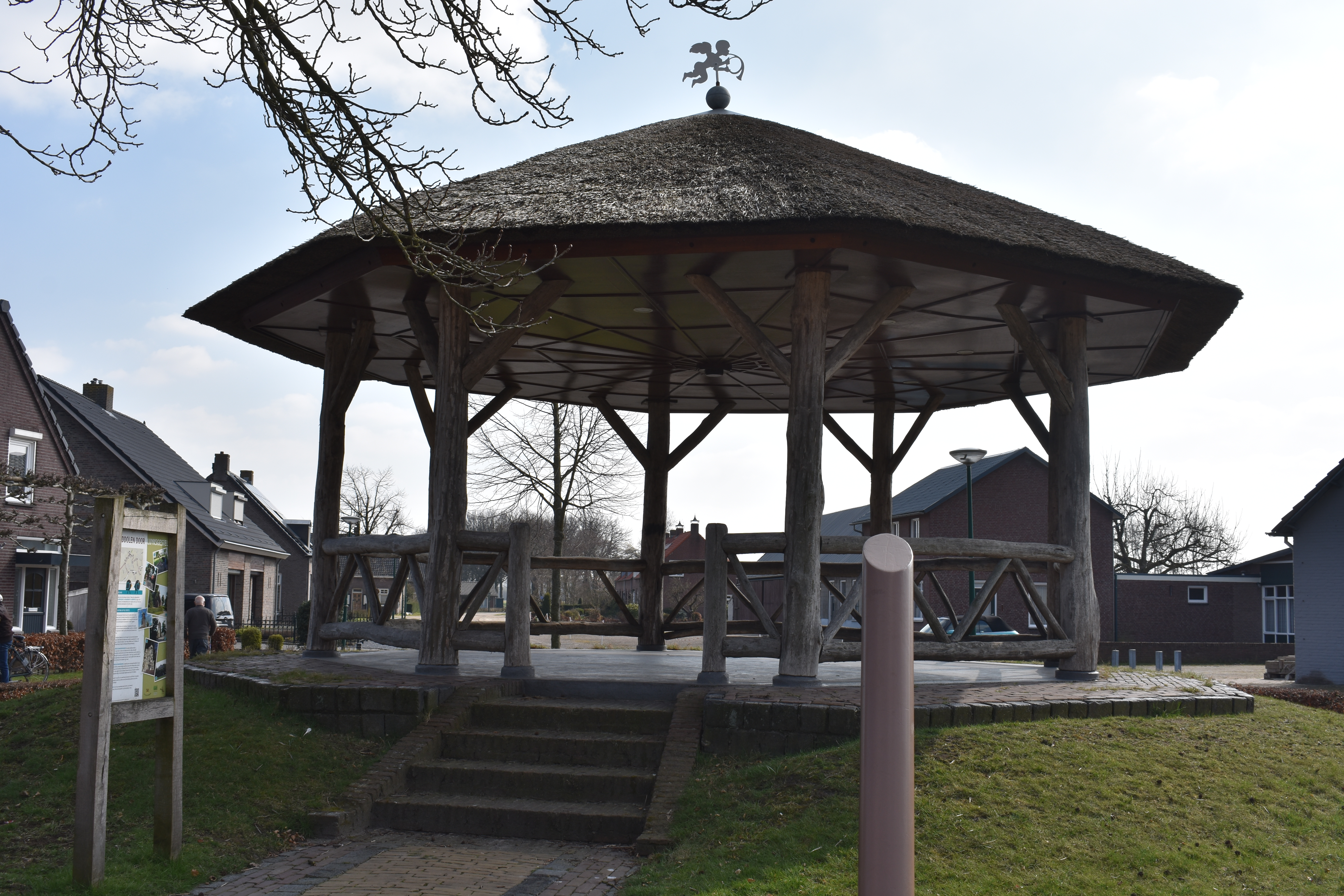
Bandstand

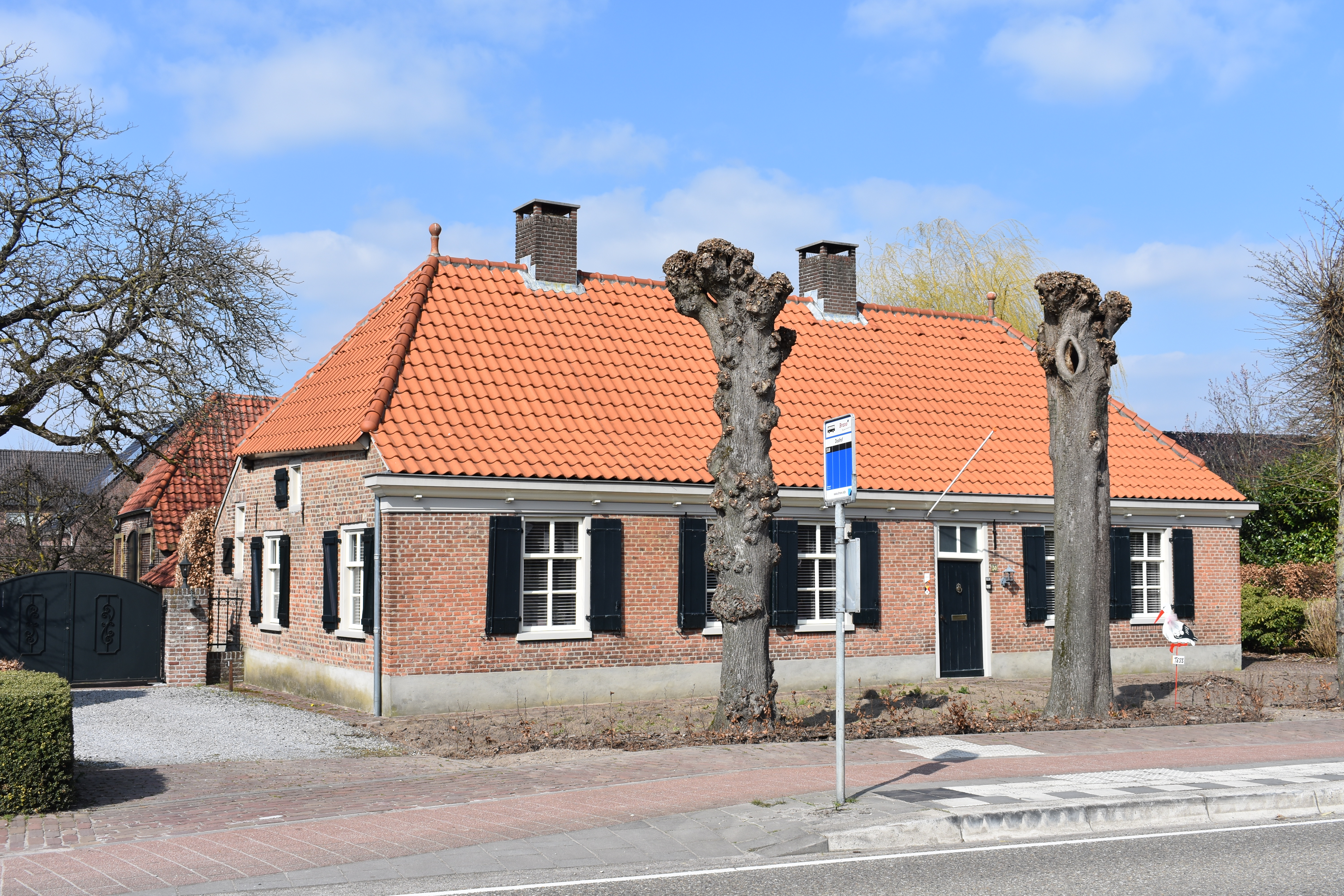
House in Luykgestel

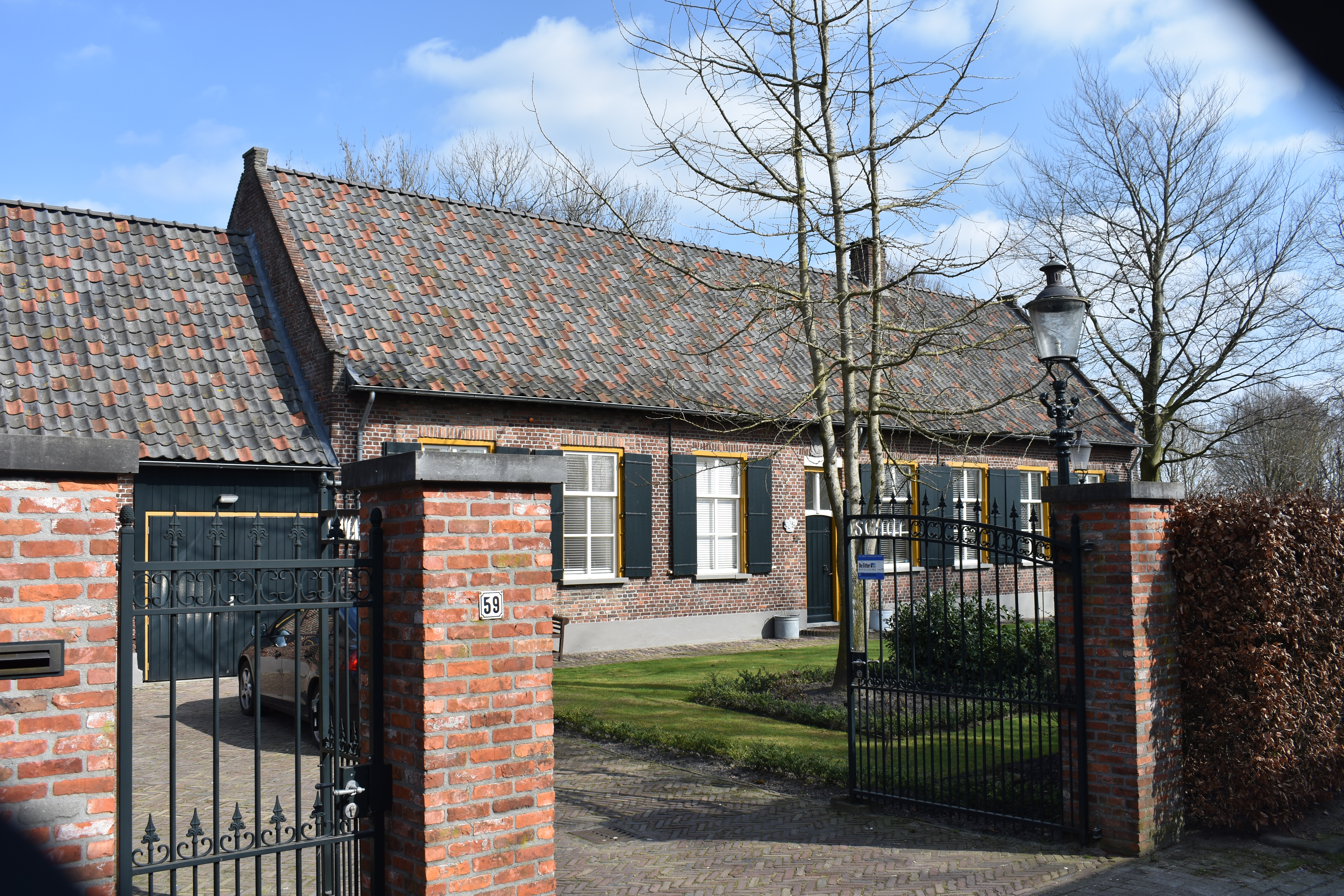
House in Luykgestel
