= Henk van Gerven =

Dutch politician (born 1955)

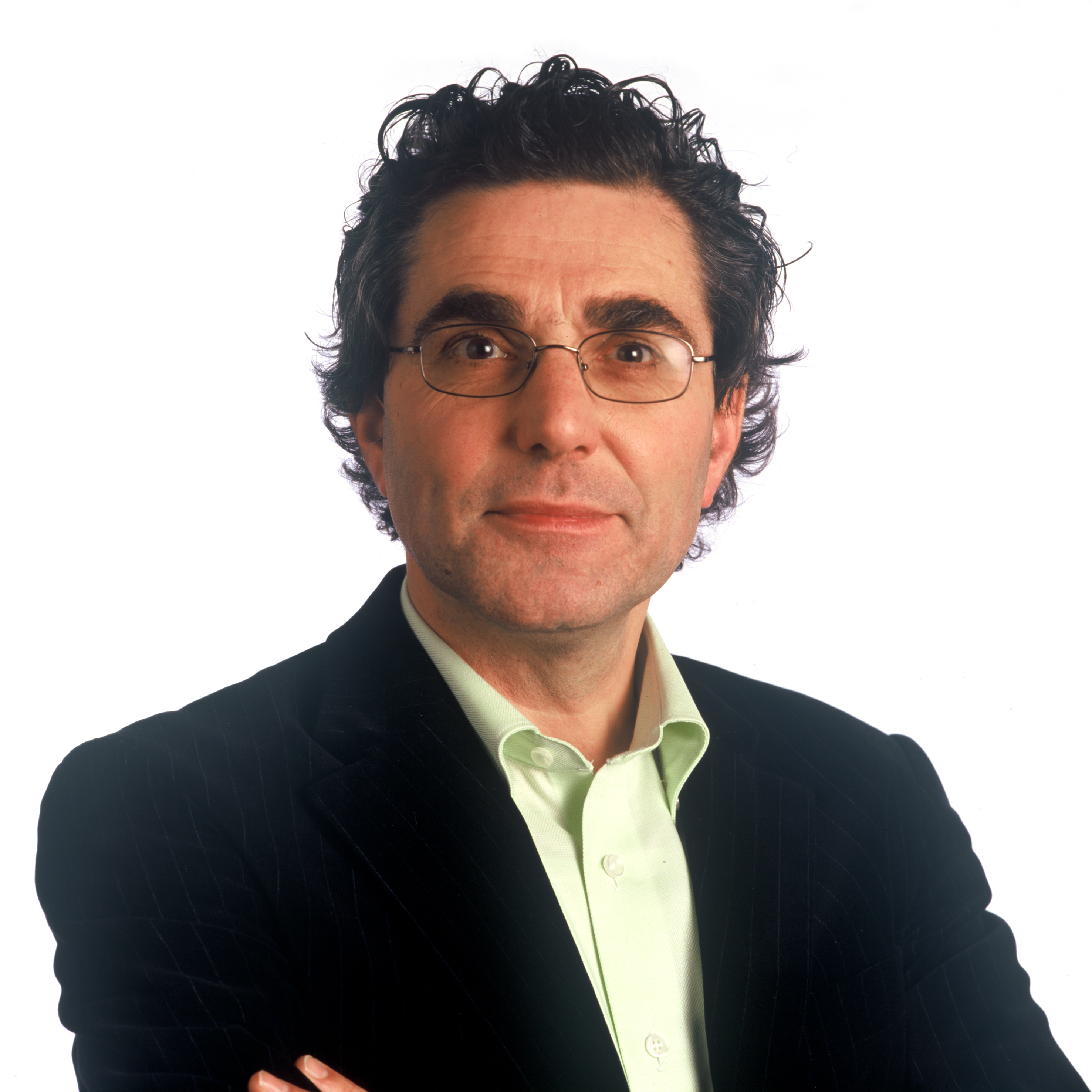
- Henk van Gerven

Member of the House of Representatives
- In office 30 November 2006 – 23 March 2017

Personal details
- Born: 11 March 1955 (age 71) Riethoven
- Party: Socialist Party
- Occupation: Politician

Henricus Petrus Johannes "Henk" van Gerven (born 11 March 1955 in Riethoven) is a Dutch politician and general practitioner. As a member of the Socialist Party (Socialistische Partij) he was an MP from 30 November 2006 to 23 March 2017. He focused on matters of health care (especially physicians, hospitals and medications), natural environment and public expenditure.

From 1995 to 1996 he was a member of the States-Provincial of North Brabant. From 1996 to 2006 he was a member of the municipal council of Oss and also an alderman of this North Brabant municipality from both 1996 to 2000 and from 2002 to 2006.

Van Gerven studied medicine at Radboud University Nijmegen.

== Electoral history ==
Electoral history of Henk van Gerven
Year	Body	Party	Pos.	Votes	Result		Ref.
Year	Body	Party	Pos.	Votes	Party seats	Individual	Ref.
2024	European Parliament	Socialist Party	29 (Note: Van Gerven participated as a lijstduwer.)	888	0	Lost	
