= Wilbert Das =

Dutch fashion designer

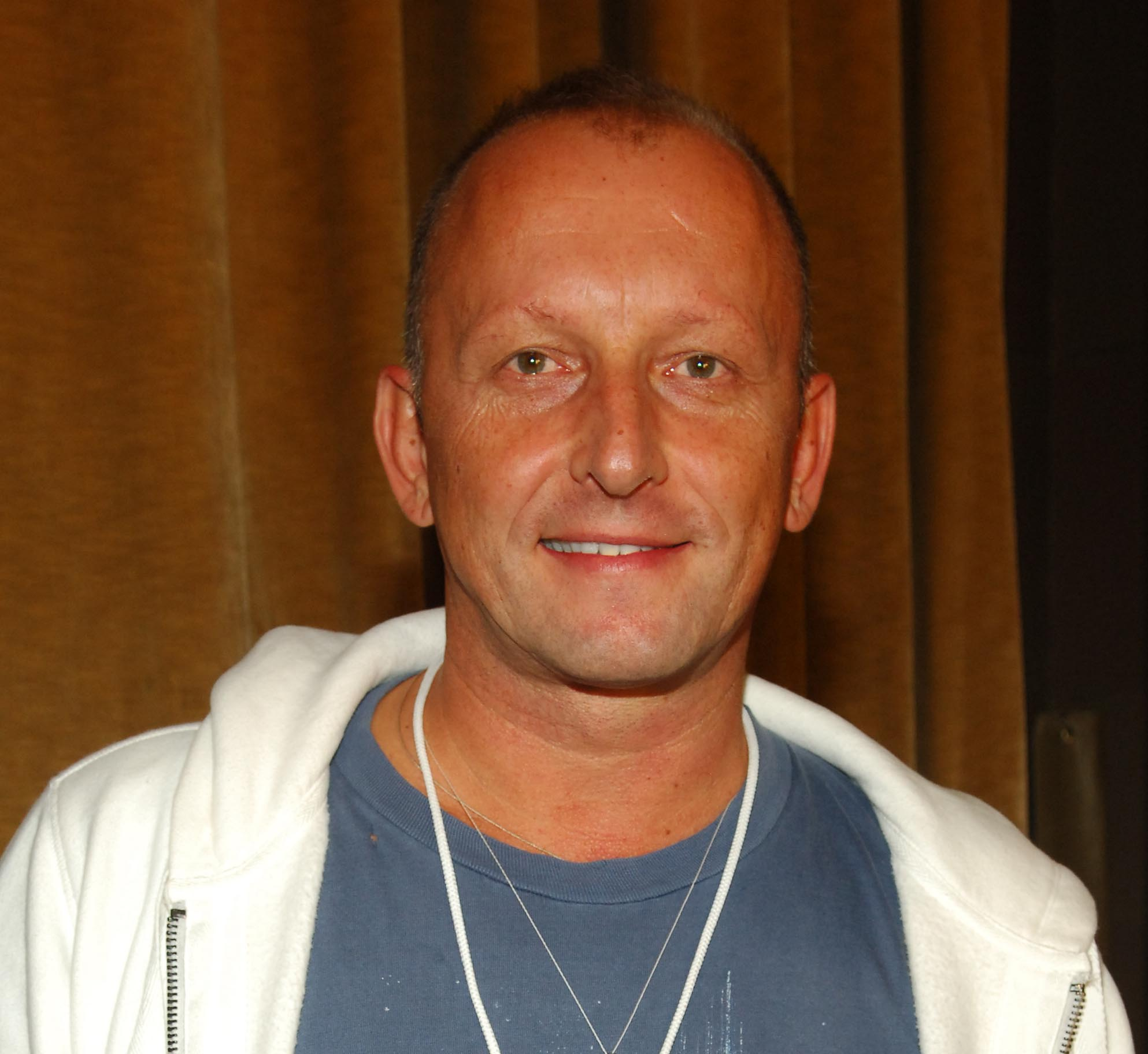
- Born: 2 December 1963 (age 62); Holland
- Education: Academy of Fine Arts in Arnhem
- Occupation: Fashion designer
- Label: Former Creative Director of Diesel

Wilbert Das (born 2 December 1963) is a Dutch fashion designer.

== Biography ==
Wilbert Das spent his formative years working on his parents dairy farm in the small village of Riethoven in the southern Netherlands. At age 19, he left Riethoven to study fashion design at the Academy of Fine Arts in Arnhem, where he received his diploma in 1988. Das was intrigued by the revolution that was taking place in Italian fashion; after graduating from Arnhem, Das travelled to Italy for an interview with clothing manufacturer Renzo Rosso, the owner of the fashion brand Diesel. Das was offered a job on the spot. In fact, he started working at Diesel that day in the role of assistant male designer on the Male, Accessories, Leather and Kids lines; he was soon directing the style office. In 1993, Das was recognized with the title of Creative Director.

== Collection Design ==
During Das' early years with Diesel, the company became most famous for its denim collections. Throughout this time, Diesel used many techniques to age jeans and give them a more vintage feel; this included experimenting with dyes, destruction, movement of pockets, reshaping and introduction of curves.

In subsequent years, and under Das's creative direction, Diesel introduced collections of footwear, eyewear (Diesel Shades), jewellery (Diesel Jewellery), and watches (Diesel Timeframes).

== Communications & Advertising ==
As well as being responsible for the development of all Diesel's fashion and accessories collection, in his role as Creative Director, Das also oversaw the creative aspects of every Diesel campaign from the time the company began advertising until 2009. The influence of Diesel's communications campaigns, published under the umbrella label “For Successful Living”, have won Diesel and Das the Grand Prix, Gold, and ‘Advertiser of the Year’ awards at the International Festival of Advertising at Cannes.
