= Kabouter =

Creature in Dutch folklore

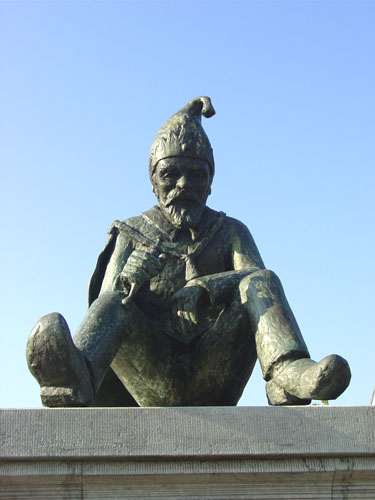
Kyrie, the gnome king from the old folklore from the Campine, a region in the Dutch province of North Brabant.

The Kabouter (Dutch pronunciation: [kaːˈbʌutər]) is a gnome-like creature in Dutch folklore. The Dutch Kabouter is akin to the Irish leprechaun, Scandinavian tomte or nisse, the English hob, the Scottish brownie and the German Klabauter or kobold.

In the folklore of the Low Countries, kabouters are tiny people, about 10–15 cm tall, who live in or near houses and stables, or in hills, in forests or on heaths. Many stories refer to vast kabouter kingdoms with specific locations where they were seen more often or resided. In modern children's stories, Kabouters live in mushrooms or sometimes underground. Kabouters can be regarded as spirits who help in the home by doing tasks at night and care for the animals like milking them. Descriptions of kabouters vary throughout time and place. Often kabouters are associated with red squirrels. The males have long, full beards and they all wear tall, pointed hats, generally of a red or green colour. Kabouters are shy of humans and in stories often punish people for spying on them. Kabouters are sometimes associated with collecting gold or treasure, but this seems mostly connected to their association with lost objects. Often they would also steal livestock for themselves if those were left unattended by the farmers. Blinding was a common punishment for spying on the gnomes, but they could also make life more difficult by souring the milk, blackening the grain, making objects disappear, or scaring the livestock. Leaving milk and bread out for kabouters was a way to improve relationships with them. Kabouters could become very old and many are depicted with grey hair. Throughout Flanders and the Netherlands, they exist under a number of different local names such as alvermanneke or auwelke.

A well known story is about the disappearance of kabouters from the Campine to an unknown place after a local hunter shot their king Kyrië.

Other stories about the disappearance of the Kabouters exist as well. About the disappearance of kabouters from East Flanders and West Flanders, telling of the boy that kept losing cows until he held onto a cow tail and was taken with the cow into a kabouter kingdom, after which he spoke so beautifully that the kabouters gave him gold and his 15 cows for him to marry his love, after which the kabouters forever disappeared to the other side of the Rhine where they still live to this day.

In the Legend of the Wooden Shoes, an old Dutch folktale, a kabouter teaches a Dutch man how to make piles and wooden shoes.

The Dutch illustrator Rien Poortvliet played an important part in modern Kabouter lore with his publication of Leven en werken van de Kabouter (The Life and Works of the Gnome), later translated into English and published as Gnomes.

In popular culture today, the business Travelocity uses a Rien Poortvliet-style statue of a kabouter for commercials. They call him the Travelocity Roaming Gnome.

== See also ==
- Dick Laan
- Gnome King Kyrië
- Kabouter Plop
- Kabouter Wesley
- Paulus the woodgnome
