= Riethoven =

- Village
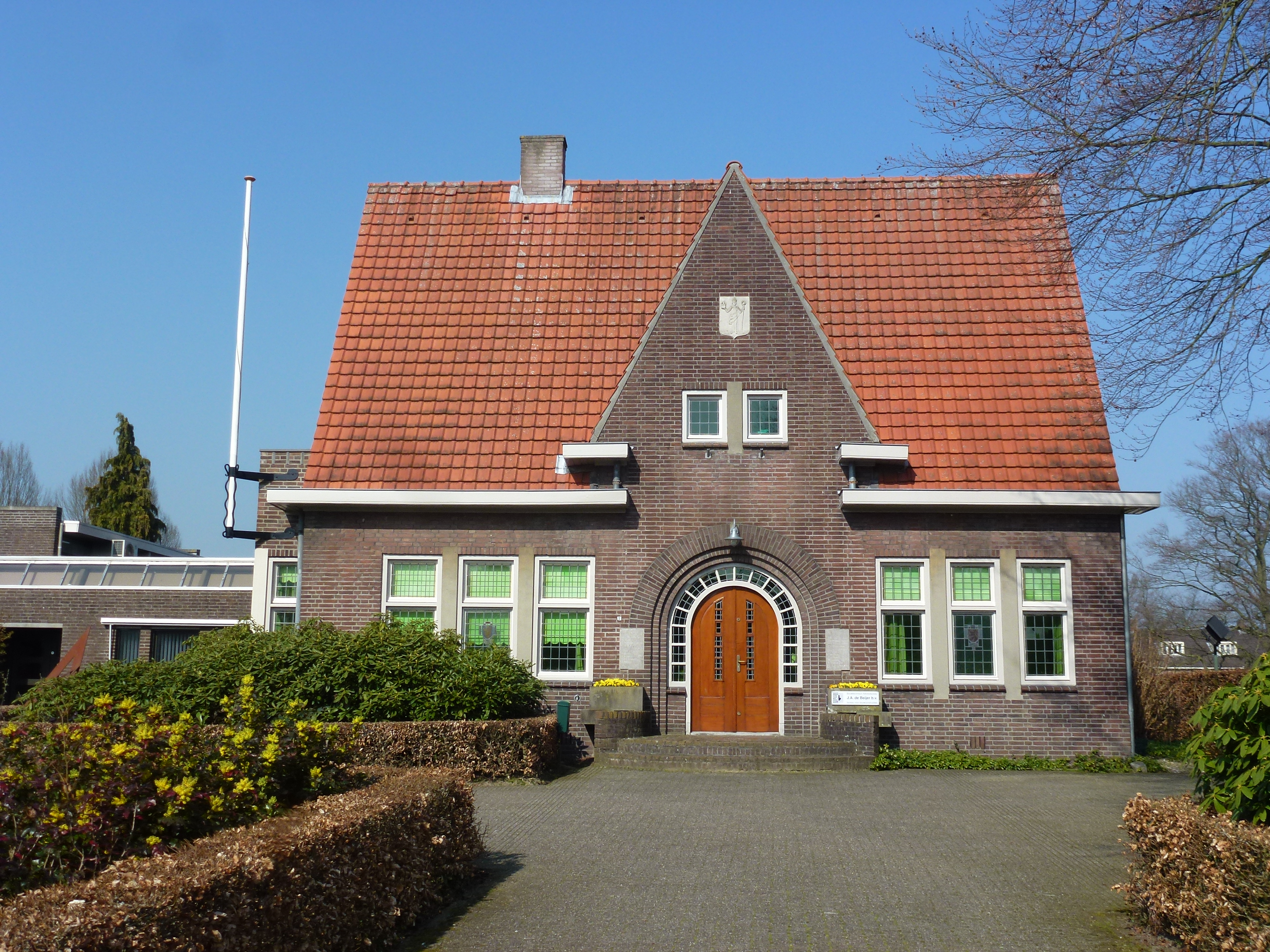
- Former town hall

- Flag Coat of arms

- Location within North Brabant Location within Netherlands Location within Europe
- Coordinates: 51°21′13″N 5°23′11″E
- Country: Netherlands
- Province: North Brabant
- Municipality: Bergeijk

Area
  - Total: 1.16 km^{2} (0.45 sq mi)
- Elevation: 28 m (92 ft)

Population (2021)
  - Total: 1,850
  - Density: 1,590/km^{2} (4,130/sq mi)
- Time zone: UTC+1 (CET)
  - Summer (DST): UTC+2 (CEST)
- Postal code: 5561
- Dialing code: 040

Riethoven (Dutch pronunciation: [ˈritˌɦoːvə(n)]) is a village in the Dutch province of North Brabant. It is located in the municipality of Bergeijk, about 15 km (9.3 mi) southwest of Eindhoven. The adjacent township of Walik is in general considered to be a part of Riethoven. Riethoven was originally called Rijthoven, but with time it changed into Riethoven. In Dutch The name means: farms at the Rijt, the Rijt being a river near the municipality.

Riethoven was a separate municipality until 1997, when it became part of Bergeijk.

The spoken language is Kempenlands (an East Brabantian dialect, which is very similar to Standard Dutch).

== Notable people ==
- Martin Rythovius (1511), the first Bishop of Ypres
- Henk van Gerven (1955), politician
- Wilbert Das (1963), Fashion designer

== Gallery ==
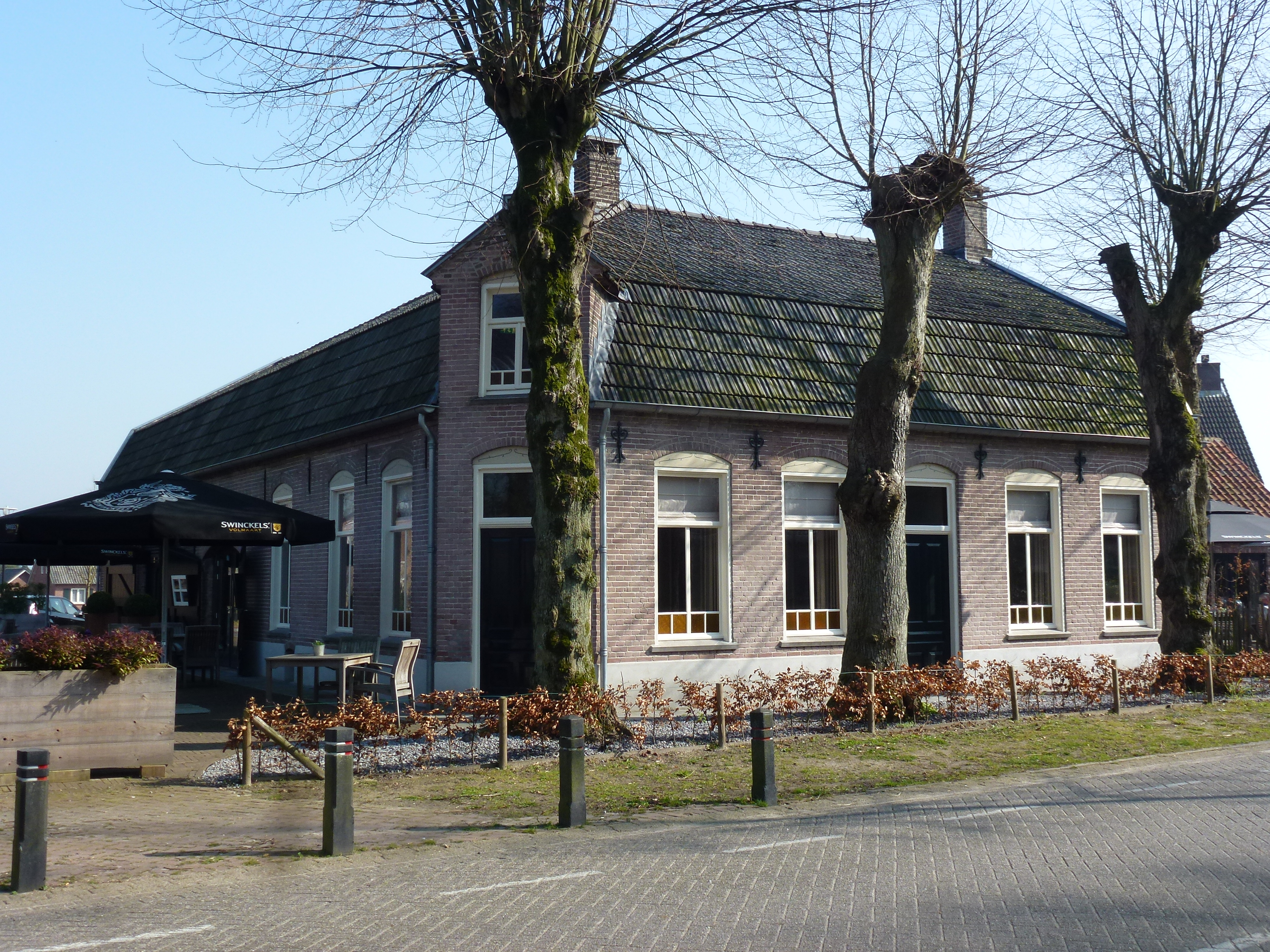
Bar in Riethoven

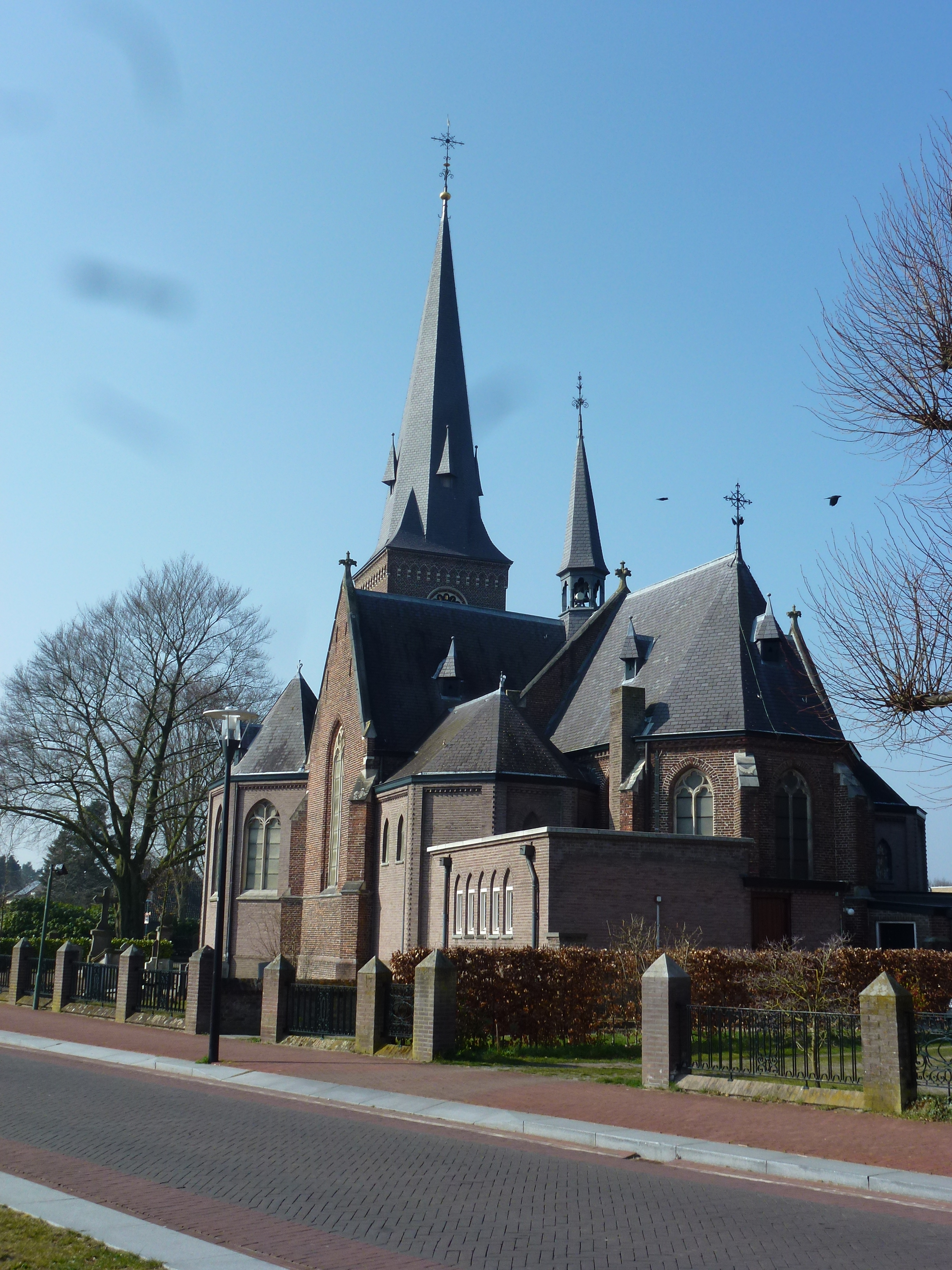
St Willibrordus Church

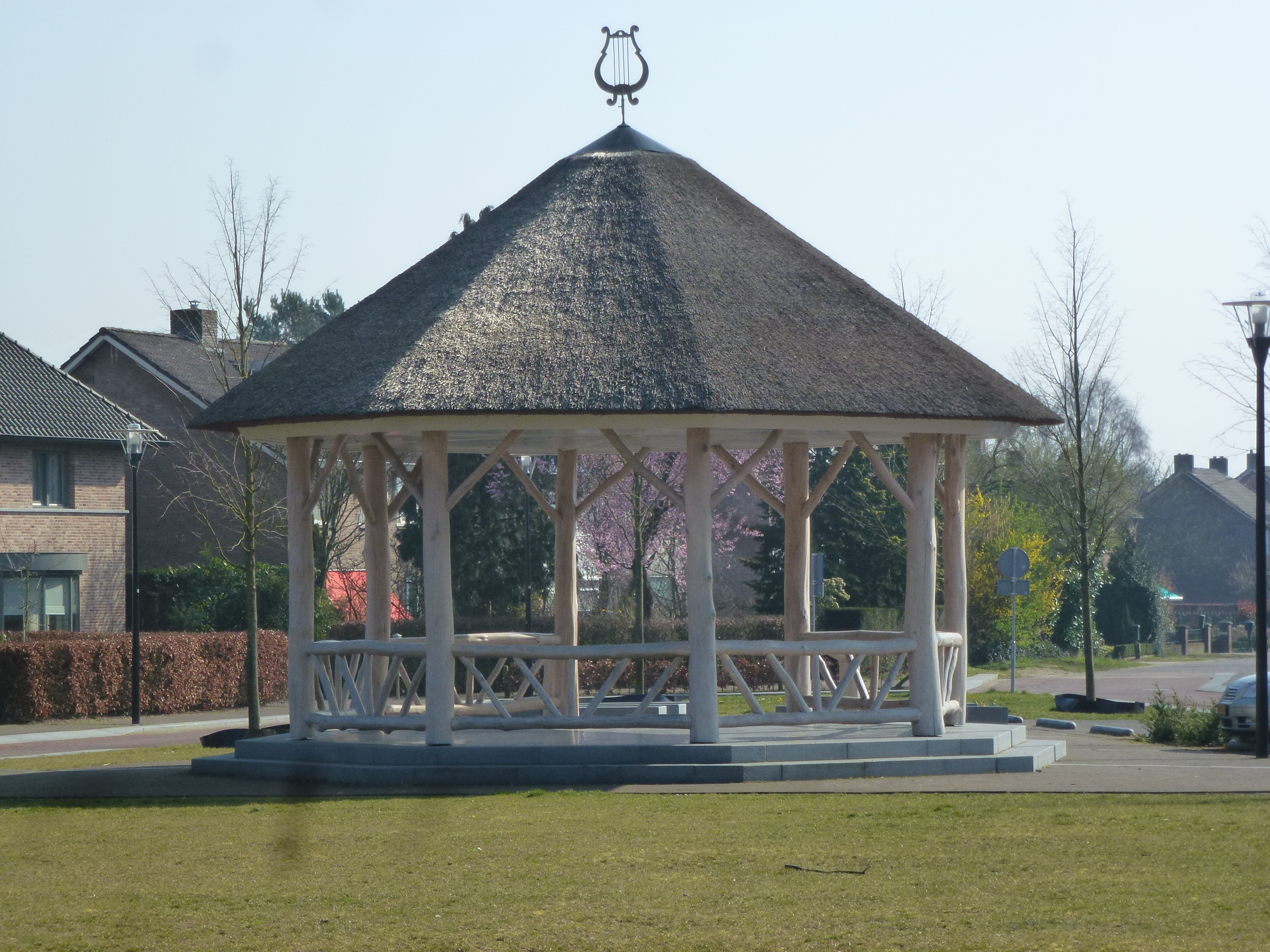
Bandstand

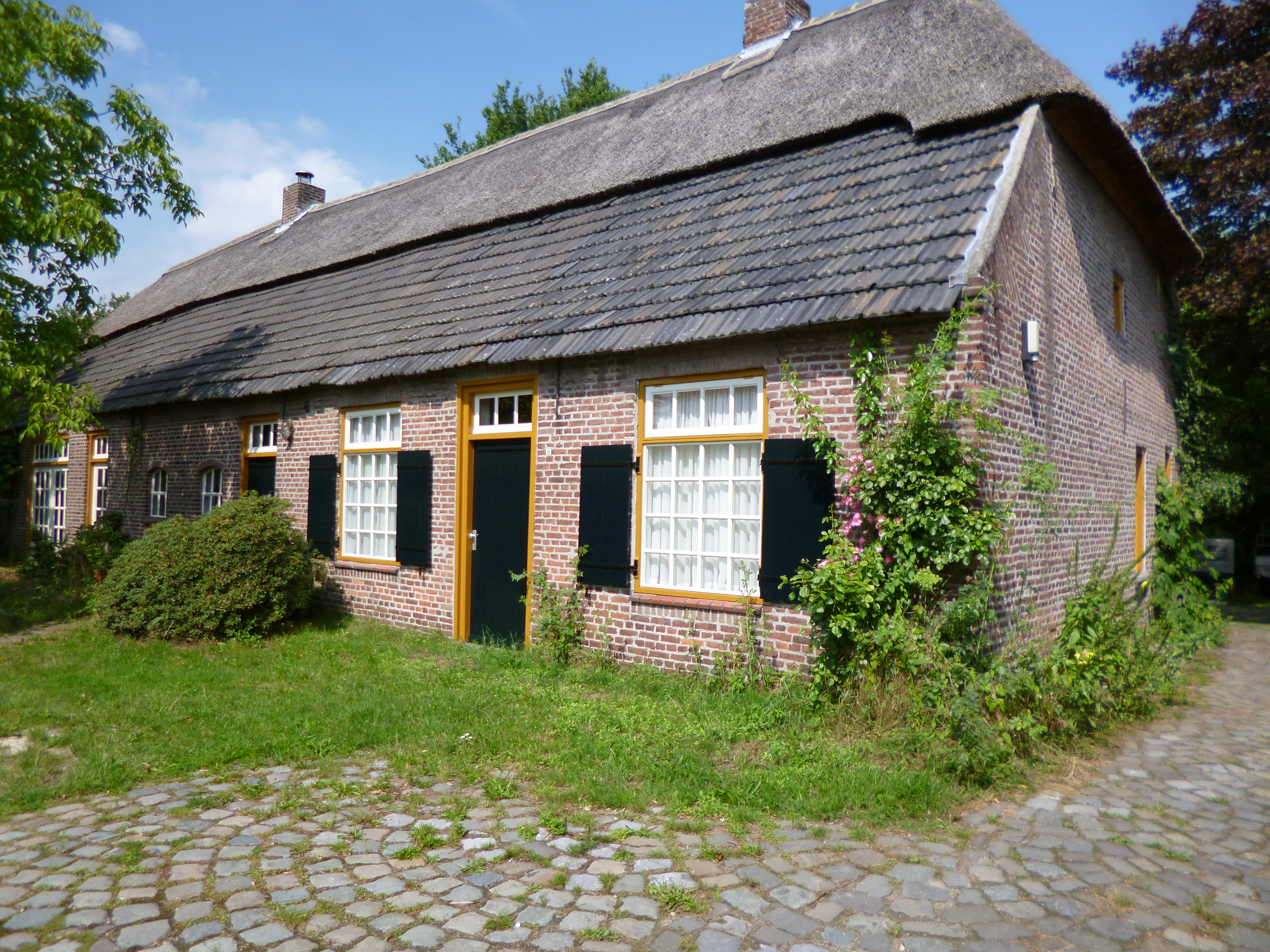
Farm in Riethoven
