= Justinia gens =

Ancient Roman family

The gens Justinia was an obscure plebeian family at ancient Rome. No members of this gens are mentioned in ancient writers, but several are known from inscriptions, chiefly from Gaul and Germania.

== Origin ==
The root of the nomen Justinius is the cognomen Jūstus, referring to someone known for being "just" or "fair". This was one of a large class of surnames derived from the character of an individual. From the surname arose both Justinus, a diminutive cognomen, and the nomen Justius. Justinius must have been formed from one of these two, using the gentile-forming suffix -inius, which could form new gentilicia from either nomina or cognomina.

== Praenomina ==
The only praenomina associated with the Justinii appearing in inscriptions are Marcus, Gaius, and Tiberius, of which the first two were very common at all periods of Roman history, while Tiberius was favoured by a smaller range of families.

== Members ==
- Justinia, named on a piece of pottery from Londinium in Britannia.
- Marcus Justinius Albus, made an offering to Nehalennia at Ganventa in Gallia Belgica, dating to the latter half of the second century, or the first half of the third.
- Justinius, made an offering to the local goddess near the present site of Pesch, near Bad Münstereifel, formerly part of Germania Inferior, in the latter half of the second century, or the first half of the third.
- Justinia Eutychia, buried at Porolissum in Dacia, aged forty-five, in a tomb built by her husband, the decurion Livius Rufus, between AD 150 and 270.
- Justinia Apra, buried at Iuvavum in Noricum, aged thirty-seven, with a monument from her husband, Marcus Lollius Victor, dating between AD 150 and 300.
- Gaius Justinius Favor, along with Desiderata, perhaps his wife, made an offering to Jupiter Optimus Maximus and Juno Regina at Mogontiacum in Germania Superior.
- Tiberius Justinius Fortunatus, buried at Tucca in Mauretania Caesariensis, aged fifty-five, with a monument from his son.
- Justinia Justina, buried at Noviomagus Nemetum in Germania Superior, with a monument from her husband, Drombinius Sacer.
- Justinia Lupula, buried at Arelate in Gallia Narbonensis, with a monument from her husband, Fannius Paternus, a soldier in the Legio XXX Ulpia Victrix.
- Marcus Justinius Marcellus, an infant buried at Lugdunum in Gallia Lugdunensis, aged one year, forty-seven days, with a monument from his parents, Marcus Justinius Secundus and Primania Marcellina.
- Justinius Mercurialis, made an offering to the local Genius at Suromagus in Gallia Belgica.
- Justinia Paterna, dedicated a tomb for Firminus, perhaps her husband, at the present site of Rheder, formerly part of Germania Inferior, between AD 170 and 230.
- Marcus Justinius Secundus, along with his wife, Primania Marcella, built a tomb at Lugdunum for their infant son, Marcus Justinius Marcellus.
- Tiberius Justinius Titianus, a beneficarius, an administrative officer in the Legio XXII Primigenia, who along with Servandia Augusta, perhaps his wife, made an offering to Mercury at Mogontiacum in AD 210. Titianus made another offering to Epona and the Genius of the Leuci at Nasium in Gallia Belgica.
- Justinia Ursa, together with her husband, Aulus Valerius Verus, made an offering to the Matronae Aufaniae at the present site of Kommern, formerly part of Germania Inferior.
- Justinia Valeria, together with her son, Camullius Onesimus, dedicated a tomb at Vasio in Gallia Narbonensis to her husband, Titus Camullius Telesphorus.
- Justinius Victorinus, buried at Aquileia in Venetia and Histria, in a tomb dedicated by his wife, Flavia Marcella, dating between AD 250 and 350.
- Justinia Villana, buried at Colonia in Germania Inferior, with a monument from her husband, Titus Sentius Ursio.

== See also ==
- List of Roman gentes

== Bibliography ==
- Theodor Mommsen et alii, Corpus Inscriptionum Latinarum (The Body of Latin Inscriptions, abbreviated CIL), Berlin-Brandenburgische Akademie der Wissenschaften (1853–present).
- René Cagnat et alii, L'Année épigraphique (The Year in Epigraphy, abbreviated AE), Presses Universitaires de France (1888–present).
- George Davis Chase, "The Origin of Roman Praenomina", in Harvard Studies in Classical Philology, vol. VIII, pp. 103–184 (1897).
- Giovanni Battista Brusin, Inscriptiones Aquileiae (Inscriptions of Aquileia), Udine (1991–1993).
