= Nehalennia (disambiguation) =

Nehalennia is an ancient European goddess.

Nehalennia or Nehellenia may also refer to:

- Nehalennia (damselfly), a genus of insects, of the family Coenagrionidae
- Queen Nehellenia, an antagonist from the Sailor Moon series
- "Nehalennia", a song by Heidevolk on the album Uit oude grond
- Nehellenia (drag queen), a contestant on the second season of Drag Race Italia
