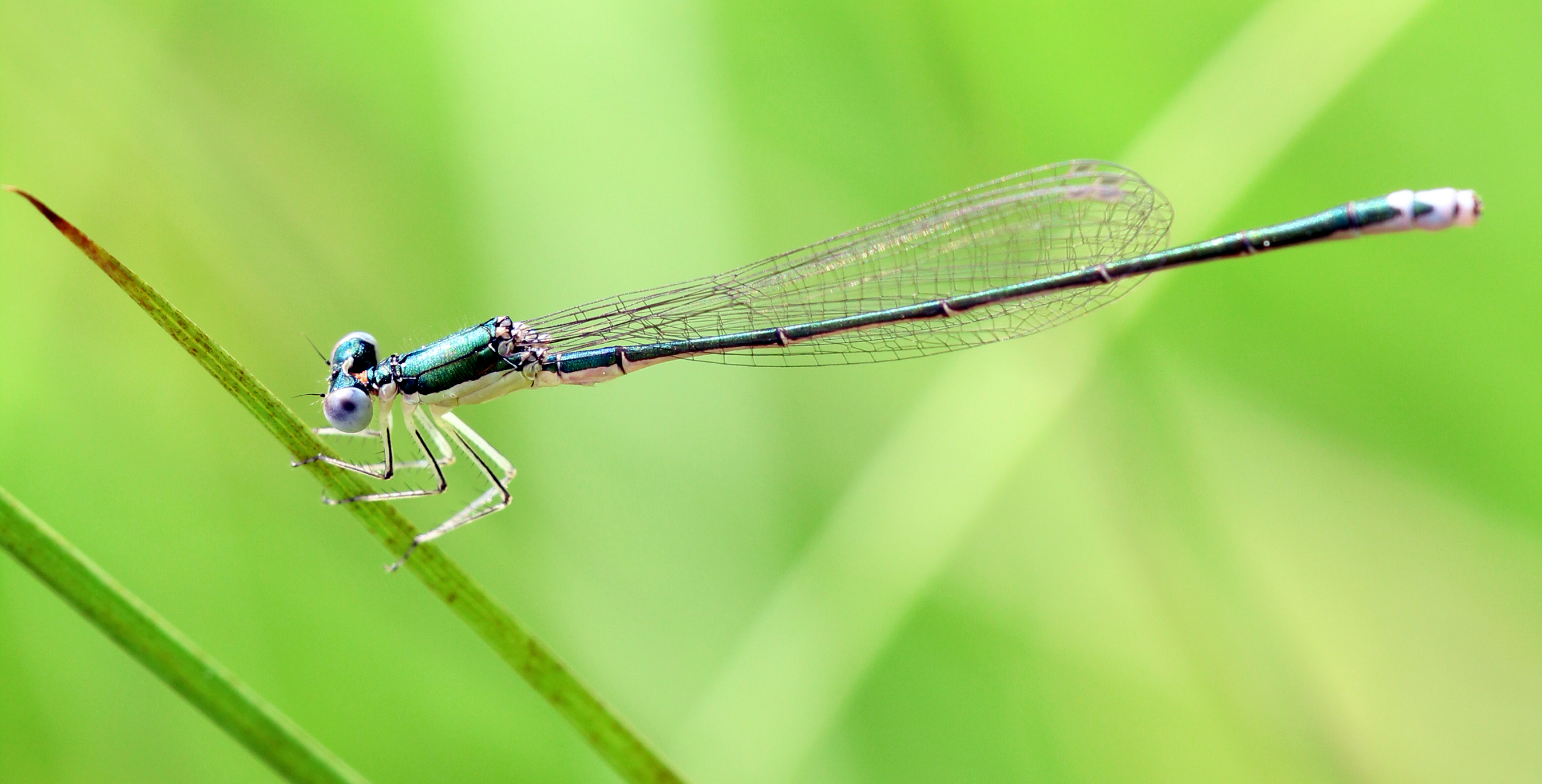

Conservation status
- Least Concern (IUCN 3.1)

Scientific classification
- Kingdom: Animalia
- Phylum: Arthropoda
- Clade: Pancrustacea
- Class: Insecta
- Order: Odonata
- Suborder: Zygoptera
- Family: Coenagrionidae
- Genus: Nehalennia
- Species: N. irene

Binomial name
- Nehalennia irene (Hagen, 1861)

= Sedge sprite =

Species of damselfly

The sedge sprite (Nehalennia irene) is a species of damselfly in the family Coenagrionidae.

== Identification ==
On male sedge sprites, the thorax is bright green above and black above blue or yellow-green on the sides. His abdomen is dark iridescent green and has a blue tip with dark green spots. His large eyes are black above blue with a thin blue bar across the top of the head. On female sedge sprites, the back of the thorax is dark green and the sides are yellowish. Her abdomen is dark above and yellowish below. Her large eyes are greenish or yellowish.

== Diet ==
The sedge sprite feeds on insects. This damselfly flight pattern is low, in and out of vegetation away from open water.

== Size ==
The sedge sprite is a rather small damselfly in size. It has an average length of 1-1.5 inches (25-38 millimeters).

== Habitat ==
The sedge sprite is usually found along vernal pools, marshes and grassy ponds.

== Distribution ==
- United States: (Alaska • California • Connecticut • District Of Columbia • Delaware • Iowa • Idaho • Illinois • Indiana • Kentucky • Massachusetts • Maryland • Maine • Michigan • Minnesota • Montana • Nebraska • North Dakota • New Hampshire • New Jersey • Ohio • Oregon • Pennsylvania • Rhode Island • South Carolina • Utah • Vermont • Washington • Wisconsin • West Virginia • Wyoming)
- Canada: (Alberta • British Columbia • Manitoba • New Brunswick • Newfoundland and Labrador • Northwest Territories • Nova Scotia • Nunavut • Ontario • Prince Edward Island • Quebec • Saskatchewan)

== Flight season ==
The sedge sprite is most active through mid May to early September.

== Habits ==
This species of damselfly has relatively narrow wings that are held above the abdomen when at rest. It will perch on many emergent plants.

== Similar species ==
Sedge sprites are similar to sphagnum sprites and southern sprites.
