= Mythology in the Low Countries =

Dutch, Belgian, and Luxembourger mythology

The mythology of the modern-day Netherlands, Belgium and Luxembourg has its roots in the mythologies of pre-Christian (e.g. Gaulish (Gallo-Roman) and Germanic) cultures, predating the region's Christianization under the influence of the Franks in the Early Middle Ages. At the time of the Roman Empire and in the Early Middle Ages, some of the resident peoples of the Low Countries' included:

- Germanic tribes north of the Rhine River (with a lot of exceptions like the Eburones or the Celtic Nervii,...)
- Low Franconians
- Frisii (and later, in the same area, the Frisians)
- Tubanti
- Canninefates
- Batavians
- the decidedly more Celtic and Gallo-Roman Belgae tribes of Gallia Belgica south of the Rhine (also mainly but with many exceptions).

Old Dutch mythology can mean the myths specifically told in Old Dutch language. However, many of the myths in this language are ancient and part of larger movements across Europe, such as Roman mythology that spread through the Roman Empire, and Continental Germanic mythology. Pre-Christian traditions of the veneration of trees (particularly the oak, see Donar's oak), springs and woods native to the Low Countries survived in Christianized guise into the Middle Ages. Sources for the reconstruction of pre-Christian traditions include the accounts of the Anglo-Saxon missionaries to the region, medieval and modern folklore and legend, and local toponymy.

== Pre-Christian traditions ==
=== Deities ===
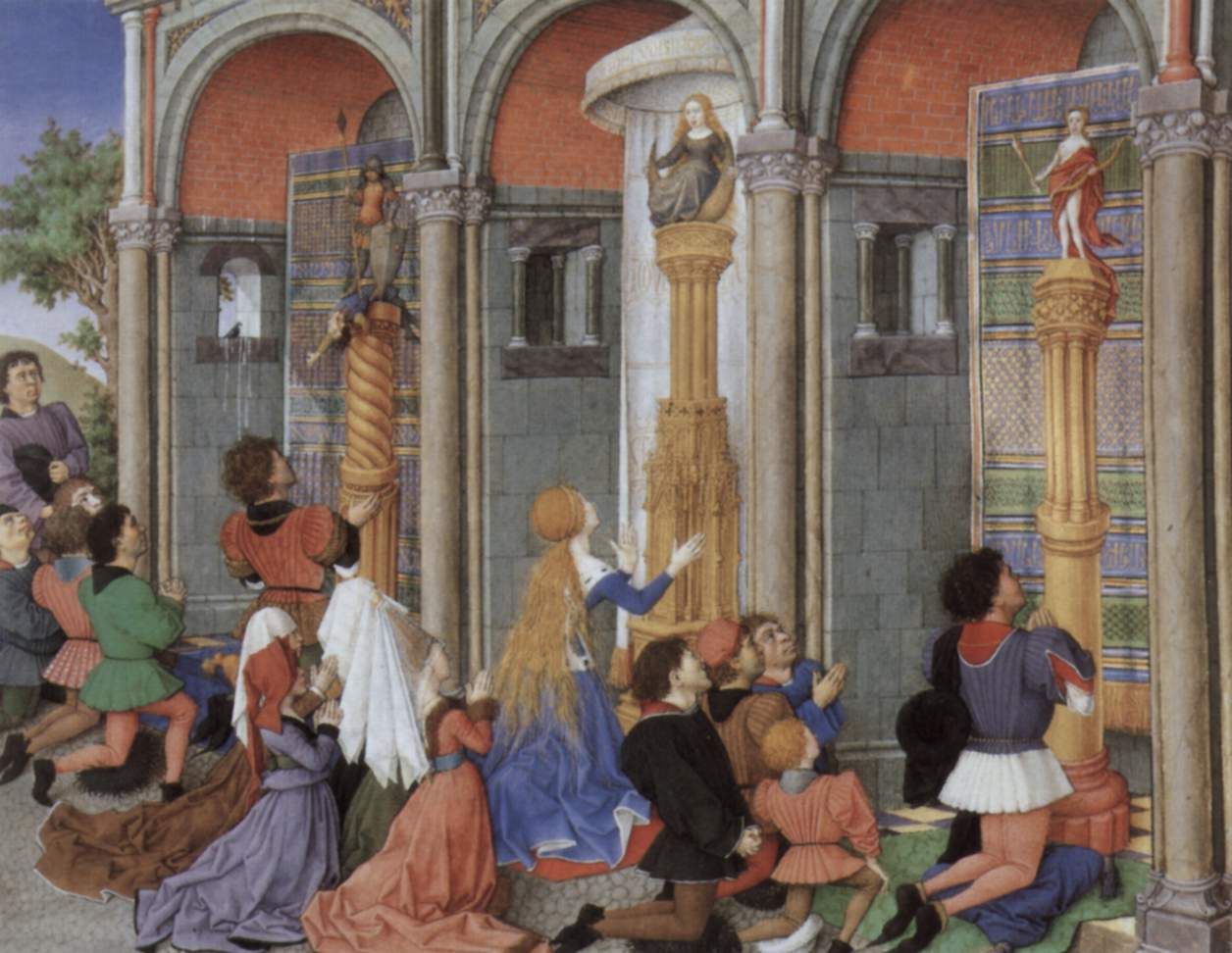
A tribute to pagan mythology illustrated in Emilia, Arcite, and Palamon worship at the shrines of the Gods - from the Théséide, circa 1460-70 by Flemish artist Barthélemy d'Eyck.

From ancient regional mythology, most names of ancient gods and goddesses in this region come from local tribal lore, particularly in the North. Many of the deities are the same as eastern Germanic Deities: Wodan is Dutch for Odin, the god of war and leader of the Wild Hunt. The Wild Hunt was retold in Dutch with Wodan leading under different guises: Gait with his dogs; Derk with his dogs; Derk with his boar; the glowing horse; Henske with his dogs.). Donar is Dutch for Thor, the god of thunder.

In Dutch the days of the week are named for Germanic gods, a custom derived from parallel Roman practice. Note that the following days were named through Roman influence, because the Romans found them to be (roughly) equivalent to their Roman deities:

1. maandag (Monday) named after Máni - compared to "dies Lunae" (Luna's day)
2. dinsdag (Tuesday) named after Tyr - compared to "dies Martis" (Mars' day)
3. woensdag (Wednesday) after Wodan - compared to "dies Mercurii" (Mercury's day)
4. donderdag (Thursday) is named after Donar - compared to "dies Jovis" (Jupiter's day)
5. vrijdag (Friday) after Frîja - compared to "dies Veneris" (Venus' day).

However other ancient deities are Druidic, Celtic and Gallo-Roman in nature, particularly in the south and throughout Flanders: Erecura, the goddess of the earth, Rosmerta, goddess of fertility, and the deities mentioned by Saint Eligius in Flanders (Jupiter, Neptune, Orcus, Diana, and Minerva).

Finally some deities were regional or specific to one clan: Arduinna was the Celtic goddess of the Ardennes forest. Nehalennia was a goddess of travellers in Zeeland, where over 160 stone votives depicting her image were located in the sea. Vagdavercustis was an ancient goddess of the Batavians mentioned on an altar near Cologne. Tanfana is another more mysterious goddess recorded in the 1st century AD.

=== Other beings ===
The Dutch words witte wieven and wittewijven in Dutch dialects means "white women". They were spirits of the women who died of heartbreak after their men had been untrue to them. They would live on in the mists and appear when it was night and misty. They would attack men who were untrue to their women by getting them lost in the mists.

Nature spirits: The following beings may have originated as deities or supernatural beings in mythology, and later recharacterized as nature spirits during the Middle Ages; The Dutch like other Germanic people believed in elves, the Dutch words for them are elfen, elven, and alven. The moss maidens, who appear in Old Dutch and Southern Germanic folklore were known as tree spirits or wood elves, often chased in the Dutch version of the Wild Hunt. The Kabouter was the Dutch name for the kobold (gnome), a household spirit and earth spirit who usually lived underground.

=== Mythological heroes ===
The first epic heroes, kings and leaders of The Low Countries, considered mythological, in the sense of supernatural and foundational, include:

- Tuisto (Tuisco) - the mythical ancestor of all Germanic tribes.
  - Mannus - ancestor of a number of Germanic tribes, son of Tuisto.
    - Ing (Ingwaz, Yngvi) - founder of the Ingaevones tribe, son of Mannus.
    - Istaev - founder of the Istvaeones tribe, son of Mannus.
- Redbad, King of the Frisians
- Folcwald - hero of Frisian tribes.
  - Finn (Frisian) - hero of Frisian tribes, Frisian lord, son of Folcwald.
- Merovech, semi-legendary founder of the Merovingian dynasty

=== Mythological objects ===
Objects considered magical or sacred in the Low Countries (7th century) included: Oak trees, springs and wooded groves had sacred and medicinal powers.

Corn dollies ("vetulas") were thought to hold the spirit of the corn in harvest rituals. Amulets and charms were worn on the head or the arms ("phylacteries") for protection and veneration of the gods and goddesses.

Neolithic ground axes were collected, thought to be Donar's lightning. Farmers hung these axes in their homes to protect against lightning strike, in accordance with the belief that 'lightning never strikes the same place twice'.

=== Missionary accounts ===
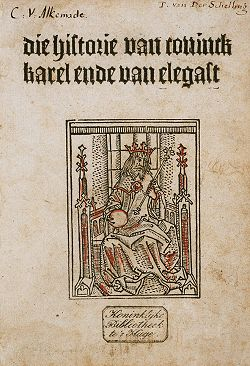
Old publication of Karel ende Van Elegast, 12th century Dutch story of an "elf-guest" or "elf-spirit" who supports the Christian King Charlemagne.

After the influence of Christian missionaries, the original mythologies were lessened in power, and for the most part adapted into folklore and legends, often made diminutive. The witte wieven for example became ghosts haunting sacred sites. However sacred beliefs and practices continued, often incorporated with Christianity. In a good example, the 12th century poem from the Netherlands Karel ende Elegast (Charlemagne and elf guest), an elven being is described as the hero who befriends and helps the Christian king Charlemagne in the forest. The Bishop of Utrecht Arnold II van Hoorn, 1372-1375, noted the Flemish people still believed in wearing amulets and charms ("phylacteries"); he defined them as amulets worn on the head or arms, sometimes made out of books or scripture. In the Hieronymous Bosch painting, Cure of Folly, 1475-1480, the woman balancing a book on her head is thought to be a satire of the people wearing phylacteries.

The written biographies of the Christian missionaries to the Netherlands, sermonizing against pre-Christian beliefs, are coincidentally some of the earliest written accounts of the myths that existed in the region. The missionary texts written by the incoming Christian missionaries in the 7th century and 8th century recorded details of the pre-Christian myths of the native culture, although the missionaries showed religious hostility to them as pagan beliefs. The main missionaries of the Netherlands were Willibrord, Bonifatius and Saint Eligius.

==== Willibrord ====
Willibrord (658 – 739), appointed Bishop of Utrecht, came to the Netherlands in 690, and was the first Anglo-Saxon missionary to preach Christianity there. The Christian Franks had just reoccupied and taken control of the lands from the Frisian tribes. The vita of Willibrord records he went on a missionary journey to an island called Fositesland (most think this was Helgoland occupied by ethnic Frisians), between Friesland and Denmark. Willibrord found it had sanctuaries and shrines dedicated to the Scandinavian gods Fosite, son of Balder and Nanna. He found the land was extremely sacred to the native people. A sacred well existed, and people drank its spring water only in silence. Willibrord slew the sacred cattle he found there, and baptized three people in the well within a few days of arriving.

Willibrord took other mission trips on the Dutch mainland where he witnessed that the people considered clearings in woods, springs and wells sacred to their mythology and religion. Willibrord tried to erase their pagan shrines and landmarks. He built a church in a sacred heathen clearing in the forest, destroyed a sacred forest in Heiloo and renamed heathen wells as Christian wells. Many wells were renamed in his name.

In 714, the Frisian King Radboud drove Willibrord and his priests out of the area. Willibrord returned about 719 after the Frankish troops had taken control of the area and the King Radboud had died. Willibrord continued to dismantle pre-Christian sanctuaries.

==== Bonifatius ====
Bonifatius (672–753), also known as Boniface, was the next missionary among the Frisians and Saxons. He arrived on a missionary trip to the Netherlands in 716, specifically going to Dorestad, modern-day Wijk bij Duurstede. When he arrived, Bonifatius found that the Frisians had restored and rebuilt their fana delubrorum, the heathen temples, after Willibrord had been driven out. King Radboud allowed Bonifatius to spread Christian messages but he found the natives had a pantheon of gods and were not that impressed with Christianity. He left the same year.

In 719 Rome appointed Bonifatius to convert "the savage people of Germania". Bonifatius joined Willibrord in Utrecht to receive a three-year missionary training, then in 721 travelled east of the Netherlands into Hesse, Germany. Bonifatius undertook a final preaching mission in Friesland in June 753 when he was attacked and killed by a group of Frisians with unknown (legend says resentful) intentions.

==== Saint Eligius ====
One of the best glimpses of late Druidic practices in the territory of the modern day Flanders region comes from the Vita Eligii (Life of Saint Eligius) (588 to 660) (written by Saint Ouen). Eligius was the Christian missionary to the people of the Low Countries in the 7th century. Ouen drew together the familiar admonitions of Eligius to the people of Flanders. Eligius in his sermons denounced "pagan customs" that the people followed. In particular, he denounced many Roman deities and Druidic mythological beliefs and objects:

"I denounce and contest, that you shall observe no sacrilegious pagan customs. For no cause or infirmity should you consult magicians, diviners, sorcerers or incantators. ..Do not observe auguries ... No influence attaches to the first work of the day or the [phase of the] moon. ... [Do not] make vetulas [a type of corn dolly], little deer or iotticos or set tables [for the house-elf] at night or exchange New Year gifts or supply superfluous drinks [a Yule midsummer custom]...No Christian. .. performs solestitia [solstice rites?] or dancing or leaping or diabolical chants. No Christian should presume to invoke the name of a demon, not Neptune or Orcus or Diana or Minerva or Geniscus... No one should observe Jove's day in idleness. ... No Christian should make or render any devotion to the gods of the trivium, where three roads meet, to the fanes or the rocks, or springs or groves or corners. None should presume to hang any phylacteries from the neck of man nor beast. ..None should presume to make lustrations or incantations with herbs, or to pass cattle through a hollow tree or ditch ... No woman should presume to hang amber from her neck or call upon Minerva or other ill-starred beings in their weaving or dyeing. .. None should call the sun or moon lord or swear by them. .. No one should tell fate or fortune or horoscopes by them as those do who believe that a person must be what he was born to be."

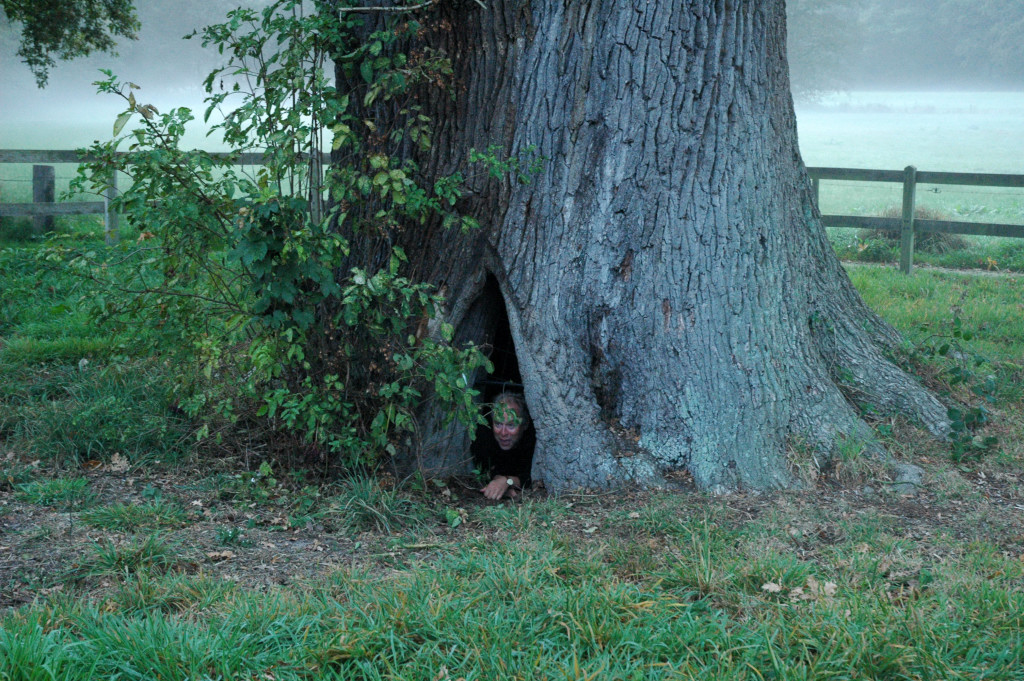
Dikke Boom: this is the largest oak tree in the Netherlands today. The Dutch thought oak trees sacred.

=== Procopius ===
Procopius in the 540s records a belief and/or funerary rite observed at the mouths of the Rhine involving the passage of the dead to the island of Brittia (Great Britain).

== Folklore ==
In 1918, William Elliot Griffis wrote down and translated Dutch folk tales, and published the book, Dutch Fairy Tales for Young Folks. Among them, the story of The Legend of the Wooden Shoe, clearly begins with fragments of Druidic mythology in the ancient Netherlands retold for children:

"In years long gone, too many for the almanac to tell of, or for clocks and watches to measure, millions of good fairies came down from the sun and went into the earth. There, they changed themselves into roots and leaves, and became trees. There were many kinds of these, as they covered the earth, but the pine and birch, ash and oak, were the chief ones that made Holland. The fairies that lived in the trees bore the name of Moss Maidens, or Tree 'Trintjes,' which is the Dutch pet name for Kate, or Katharine...."

The story outlines the following traditional beliefs in Holland: Wodan (mentioned here as "God of Sun") is the deity the Dutch shared with other Germanic people, and is the Dutch name for Odin. Wednesday is named after him; Holland is from the phrase Holt Land which means "Land of Many Trees". The tale says the land was once covered with forests and people lived in the trees for a "thousand years" until they became an agricultural people. In fact, the trees kept the land firm otherwise it would melt or disappear under water and floods. Eyck is ancient Dutch word for oak (the modern spelling is 'Eik')that has become a popular Dutch surname. There is notable ambiguity in the tale if the Moss Maiden and Trintje were tree fairies, or a wood elf and tree elf, respectively. As elves, they communicate the trees' promise to humans to "stand upside down" for the Dutch people. The oak trees in particular were the mythical life giving and medicinal tree and had many mythical purposes:

"Under its branches, near the trunk, people laid their sick, hoping for help from the gods. Beneath the oak boughs. ..wives joined hand in hand around its girth, hoping to have beautiful children. Up among its leafy branches the new babies lay, before they were found in the cradle by the other children. To make a young child grow up to be strong and healthy, mothers drew them through a split sapling or young tree. Even more wonderful, as medicine for the country itself, the oak had power to heal. The new land sometimes suffered from disease called the val [or fall]. When sick with the val, the ground sunk. Then people, houses, churches, barns and cattle all went down, out of sight, and were lost forever, in a flood of water."

In this legend, the Kabouter and the elves show mankind how to turn the trees into piles to drive into them upside down into the ground and thus to make the land firm to build on, later how to make wooden shoes. Note that historically, Dutch land was low and prone to flooding, hence the land would sometimes flood and wipe out towns and villages, and the flooding was worse when forests were cut down to make way for agricultural and pastoral lands.

== Landmarks and toponymy ==
Many regional legends exist in the Low Countries about the origins of natural landmarks such as hills, bodies of water, springs, wells, forests and the sea, that attribute creation to the ancient gods. Other legends tell where different witte wieven lived on as spirits in the Middle Ages, which are probably recharacterized stories of sacred sites. Many nice examples were collected in the book Veluwsche Sagen by Gustaaf van de Wall Perné (1877-1911). The Veluwsche Sagen was a historically researched collection of Dutch "sagas" from the legends and folk almanacs in the province of Gelderland:

The creation of the Uddeler- and Bleeke Lake(s): This myth concerns a battle that allegedly took place between Donar the God of Thunder with the winter giants and the "Midgaardslang" (a giant snake monster) who strategically align against him. The giants throw hail down, while the snake climbs into a tall oak tree and blows poison into the air. Donar attacks, riding through the air on "his billy-goat wagon", the sky blazes and the earth trembles because of his "never missing thunderhammer." Donar strikes the snake on his head with such force on the head that not only was the monster crushed, the mighty thunderhammer went seven miles deep into the earth. The snake dies. However, in the attack the snake's poison scorches and stuns Donar. Donar crashes down, with his "steerless goats" and wagon onto the Donderberg (meaning Donar's hill or "Thunder-hill") in Dieren. Then the earth sank into the sea, the seagod blew a horn and a big black ship came to collect Donar's body. When the floodwaters receded, two lakes mark the spot that are "as deep as the world, the Uddelermeer or "Lake of Uddel" (Uttiloch), and the Godenmeer (God's lake)..." Later the legend continues that Thor's hammer surfaced from the depths. The grave of Midgaardslang became overgrown with the forest nearby, until in 1222 a bright flame shot out of the pool and the ghost of the snake wriggled up and fled north. The forest was burned and a moor near the lake remains where the forest once was.

Perné notes that Donar was worshipped at the Godenmeer (lake of the Gods), although the translator thinks that the lake Godenmeer may be a Christian version of Wodenmeer, a lake originally dedicated to Wodan.

=== Monuments ===
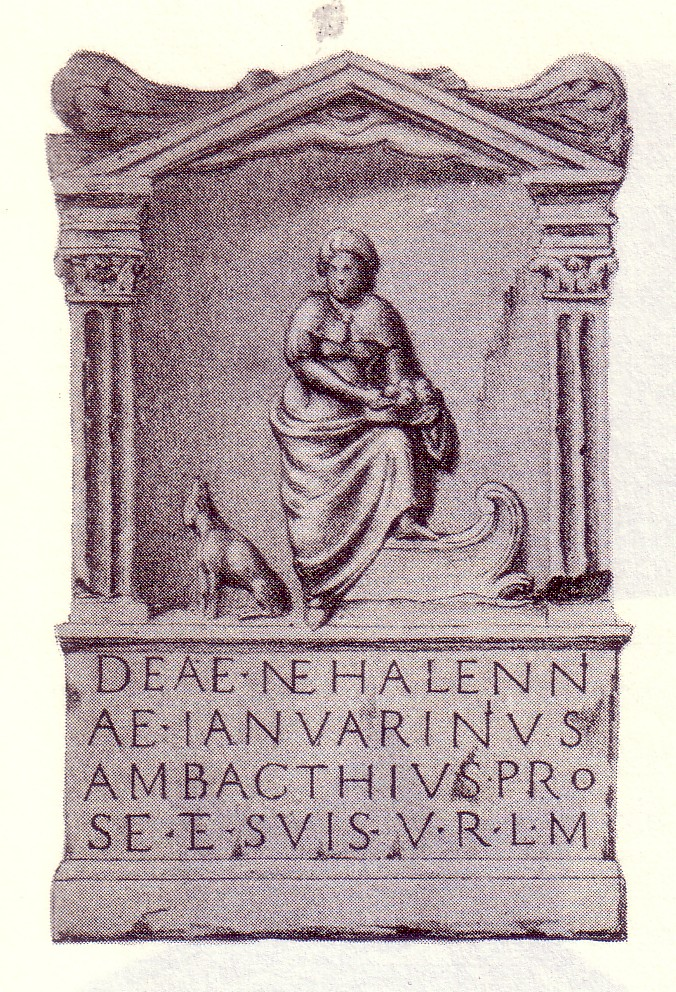
Carved stone votive for Nehalennia in Domburg, Zeeland, the Netherlands

An ancient stone altar dating from around the 2nd century CE found at Cologne (Köln), Germany is dedicated to the goddess Vagdavercustis. Vagdavercustis was most likely a native Germanic or Celtic goddess, who may have had a link with trees or woods. There is some evidence that Vagdavercustis was worshipped by the Batavians between present-day Netherlands and Cologne.

Another ancient stone altar has also been found in Ubbergen, on the Hengstberg (Stallion-hill). It has the following inscription: "Mercurius Friausius (or Eriasus)". Mercurius is Latin for the Roman god Mercury, the Roman equivalent of Wodan. Friausius is suggested to refer to his wife Frigg.

In the now flooded sites of Domburg and Colijnsplaat, on the East Scheldte Estuary, there are the remains of temples each dedicated to a deity Nehalennia. Over 160 carved stone votives with her image have been dredged up at those sites and several inscriptions in Latin thank her for safe passage on the seas.

In Empel there is the remains of a temple to Hercules Magusanus. This was the Romans' Latin name for the supreme god of the Batavians, Donar. Stone votives and broken weapons as symbolic offerings are at the location.

=== List of toponyms ===
Holland: This place name derives from the words Holt Land which means "Land of Many Trees", "Forest Land." According to the tradition (The Legend of the Wooden Shoe), the trees were filled with good spirits, and kept the land firm otherwise it would melt or disappear under water and floods.

Eyck names: The popular Dutch names, Eyck and Van Eyck, mean "oak" and "of the oak", respectively. Oak trees were venerated in Druidic religion and mythology.

Many other place names in Netherlands have ancient mythological meanings, some named after Pre-Christian deities or reflecting other myths of the ancient people:

- Donderbergen - translates to "Donar's hills" or "Thunder hills", once dedicated to Donar (located in Dieren).
- Elst - name is derivative of the word "Heliste", which means sanctuary.
- Godenmeer - translates "God's lake" or "Woden's lake" (see legend of the Uddelermeer, Uddeler- and Bleeke Lake).
- Godsberg/Godensbergen - translates "God's hill"/"Gods' hills", once dedicated to Wodan (hills located in Hattem and Ruurlo).
- Helsbergen - translates "Hel's hills", once dedicated to Hel (in Rheden).
- Heilige Berg - translates "Holy Hill" (in Roekel).
- Hemelse bergen - translates "Heavenly hills", once dedicated to Heimdal (in Arnhem, Nunspeet, Oosterbeek).
- Hennendal - translates "Valley of the Dead" (near Hummelo).
- Holland - translates "Land of Hel", land of the Germanic goddess Hel or Holle.
- Manebergen - translates "Moon hills", once a sacrificial place for the Moon.
- Materberg - translates "mother-goddess hills".
- Paasbergen - translates "Easter hills", once dedicated to spring, Ostara (hills with this name located in Arnhem, Ede, Ermelo, Lochem, Lunteren, Terborg / Wisch, Oldenzaal / Losser).
- Nijmegen - derivative of "Novio Magusanus". Magusanus was the Roman name of Donar. Nijmegen was the heart of the Batavian cult of the god Donar. Nijmegen had two temples dedicated to Donar.
- Poppestien - translates "baby stone" is a big flat stone. According to legend, it delivered babies (in Bergum).
- Willibrordsdobbe - the name of a natural well on the island, named after Willibrord, but seen by the locals as a holy well. Note according to history, Willibrord renamed the sacred pagan wells in his own name (on the island of Ameland).
- Wittewievenbult - translates "White Women hill". Local legend holds that some witte wieven appear on Christmas Eve every year and dance on this hill (near the village of Eefde).
- Wittewijvenkuil - translates "White Woman Pit", is a pit between two hills near the village. Local legend holds that three witte wieven lived there (near the village of Barchem).
- Wodansbergen - translates "Wodan's hills", once dedicated to Wodan.
- Woensdrecht - town named after Wodan.
- Woensel - former town, now city district in Eindhoven, named after Wodan: either Wodan's sale (hall) or Wodan's loo (forest).
- Woezik - translates "Wodan's oak". Several Wodans-oaks were known (in Wolfheze).
- Wrangebult - translates "Thorn-hedge-hill". A "wrange" was a plaited hedge of thorns which was sometimes created around a holy place. Local legend holds it was a heathen sacrificial hill (in Hummelo).
- Zonnebergen - translates "Sun hills", once a sacrificial place for the Sun (hills with this name located in Gorssel, Oosterbeek, Vorden, Wageningen).

== See also ==
- Gallia Belgica
- Nordwestblock
- Salian Frankish Mythology
