= Sandraudiga =

Germanic goddess

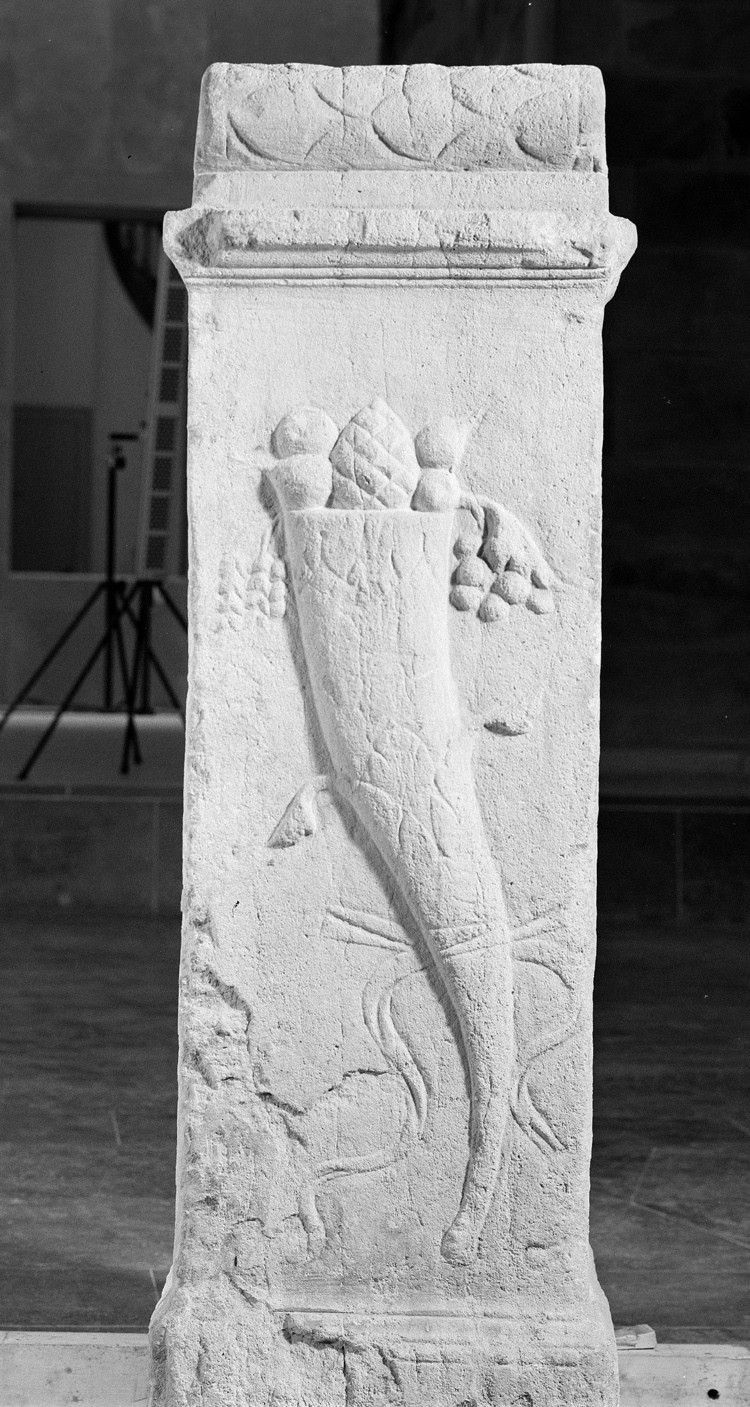
Side of the altar of Sandraudiga from Zundert. Limestone altar, dedicated to the goddess Sandraudiga. Sides decorated with cornucopiae in relief. The left cornucopiae is wrapped in a bow. The top of the altar has a triangular facade at the front, decorated with a leaf motif. On the left and right is a roll scaled along the entire length with a rosette on the front, in the middle 3 large apples in a row, which are badly damaged. On the front only the inscription.

Sandraudiga is a Germanic goddess, attested on a stone with a Latin inscription, found in North Brabant, the Netherlands. Today the stone is housed in the National Museum of Antiquities, Leiden, the Netherlands. The meaning of her name is still subject of discussion, but it has been suggested that it might mean "she who dyes the sand red". Other indigenous (southern) Dutch deities who are locally known at that time are: Vagdavercustis, Burorina, Hludana, Viradectis, Hurstrga/Hurst(ae)rga, Nehalennia and Seneucaega.

== Discovery and Inscription ==
The stone was discovered in 1812 in Tiggelt, Zundert near the village of Rijsbergen and is now in the Rijksmuseum van Oudheden in Leiden. It is made of limestone (139 × 81 × 41 cm). Above the circular base there is an inscription panel and above it a cornice corresponding to the base with an attachment with foliage or scaled decorated scrolls on both sides. The narrow sides each show different cornices as decoration. The four-line inscription is slightly eroded, yet clearly legible. The final A and E of the theonym are carved as a ligature Æ.

Deae / Sandraudigae / cultores / templi

— Corpus Inscriptionum Latinarum CIL XIII, 8774.

The inscription testifies that "Cultores" (cult personnel or functionaries) donated the stone, which is connected to a temple. Based on the region it was found, it seem to have been dedicated by the Batavi. The remains of a possible temple were discovered during subsequent excavations at the site of the stone in the 1950s. Painted remains of the wall, brick fragments, Roman and local ceramics and a number of iron products such as nails and hooks were found that can be dated to the 2nd century. Not far from the site in tiggelt, a Roman-era Germanic settlement from the middle of the 2nd century to the middle of the 3rd century was uncovered in the Rijswijker district "de Bult", which consisted of three courtyards.

== Name and Meaning ==
The two-part name shows Germanic lexemes in its respective parts. Theodor von Grienberger sees the derivation Sandr(i) from Germanic *sanþ (with grammatical alternation d <þ) in the first term, and compares it with the evidence in Old Norse sannr, Old English sóð ('true'). He also compares the link with the Visigothic personal name Sandri-mer ('the truly famous') from the early 7th century. He attributes the second link, audiga, to Gothic audags and further related terms in the Old Germanic languages with the meaning of 'rich', 'blessed' or 'happy'.

Richard M. Meyer rejected Grienberger's explanations as being too abstractly constructed, and considers the connection to the personal name Sandrimer to be problematic, since the 'r' in the theonym must be analogous to stem. The copulation of an abstract concept of “true” with the concept of “wealth” is unusual for the naming of Germanic deities. Meyer sees the goddess as a local special phenomenon that is associated with the place name Zundert and creates the name from the terms Old Saxon, Old English *sand ('sand'), and Gothic rauds and Old Norse rauðs ('reddish, red') as "goddess who reddens the sand" shown.

Siegfried Gutenbrunner has another view with the connection to Germanic *Sundra for 'special' and considers it a reference to the name of the place where it was found, Zundert, as *Sundrauda 'divine special', so that the name could mean “the truly rich”.

Norbert Wagner sees an -ra extension in the first member of the name. In the addition of Grienberger's personal name Sandrimer to the theonym Sandraudiga, he sees only a Romance sonorisation in both documents in the '-d-', a vulgar Latin appearance as in the epithet of Mars Halamardus (đ < þ). He does not see Grienberger's assumption of a grammatical change as given.

For von Grienberger, who emphasized that the stone is decorated with cornucopia on both sides, the name is evidence of a goddess of abundance and fertility. Jan de Vries also sees a “goddess of abundance” in the name, but he is skeptical of Grienberger's linguistic conclusions and leans towards Gutenbrunner's approach; Rudolf Simek on the synthesis.

Lauran Toorians derives the name of Sandraudiga from a Celtic (substratum) place or place name. He sees specifically in the Germanic form sand-raud-iga ("red sand") a Germanization of the older Celtic place name *sfonda-roudo ("red pole"), whereby he does not explain the conspicuous apositioning of the adjective. He also argues that the soil in the vicinity of the site contains a lot of iron, giving it a red color, which is also continued in the color of the local rivers. Thus, the topical reference of the name shows the goddess as the protector of the place / settlement. He also sees the same process in the name of Zundert as the adaptation of a Celtic predecessor name by new Germanic-speaking settlers.

== In popular culture ==
A depiction of the goddess of Zundert ‘Sandraudiga’ took part as a float in the Bloemencorso Zundert on Sunday September 6, 2026. Hamlet Laer-Akkermolen built the float, earning both the 2nd Jury Prize and the 2nd Public Prize. A representation of the Zundert goddess during the Zundert flower parade.

== Literature ==
- Theodor von Grienberger. "Germanische Götternamen auf rheinischen Inschriften". In: Zeitschrift für deutsches Alterthum und deutsche Literatur 35, 1891, S. 389–391.
- Siegfried Gutenbrunner. Germanische Götternamen der antiken Inschriften. Niemeyer, Halle/S. 1936, S. 98–99.
- Rudolf Simek. Lexikon der germanischen Mythologie (= Kröners Taschenausgabe. Band 368). 3., völlig überarbeitete Auflage. Kröner, Stuttgart 2006, ISBN 3-520-36803-X, S. 360.
- Lauran Toorians. "From a "red post" to Sandraudiga and Zundert". In: Oudheidkundige Mededelingen 75, 1995, S. 131–136.
- Anna-Barbara Follmann-Schulz. "Die römischen Tempelanlagen in der Provinz Germania inferior". In: Wolfgang Haase (Hrsg.): Aufstieg und Niedergang der römischen Welt Band II, 18, 1 Religion (Heidentum: Die religiösen Verhältnisse in den Provinzen). de Gruyter, Berlin/New York 1986. ISBN 3-11-010050-9, S. 672–793; hier 762, 782, Tafel VIII.
- Jan de Vries. Altgermanische Religionsgeschichte. Band 2, de Gruyter, Berlin/New York 3. unveränd. Auflage Reprint 2010, ISBN 978-3-11-002807-2, S. 322–323.
