= Ganventa =

Ancient Roman settlement on the river Scheldt

Ganventa or Ganuenta was a settlement of Roman antiquity near the Zeelandic town of Colijnsplaat. It was situated on the southern shore of the river Scheldt.

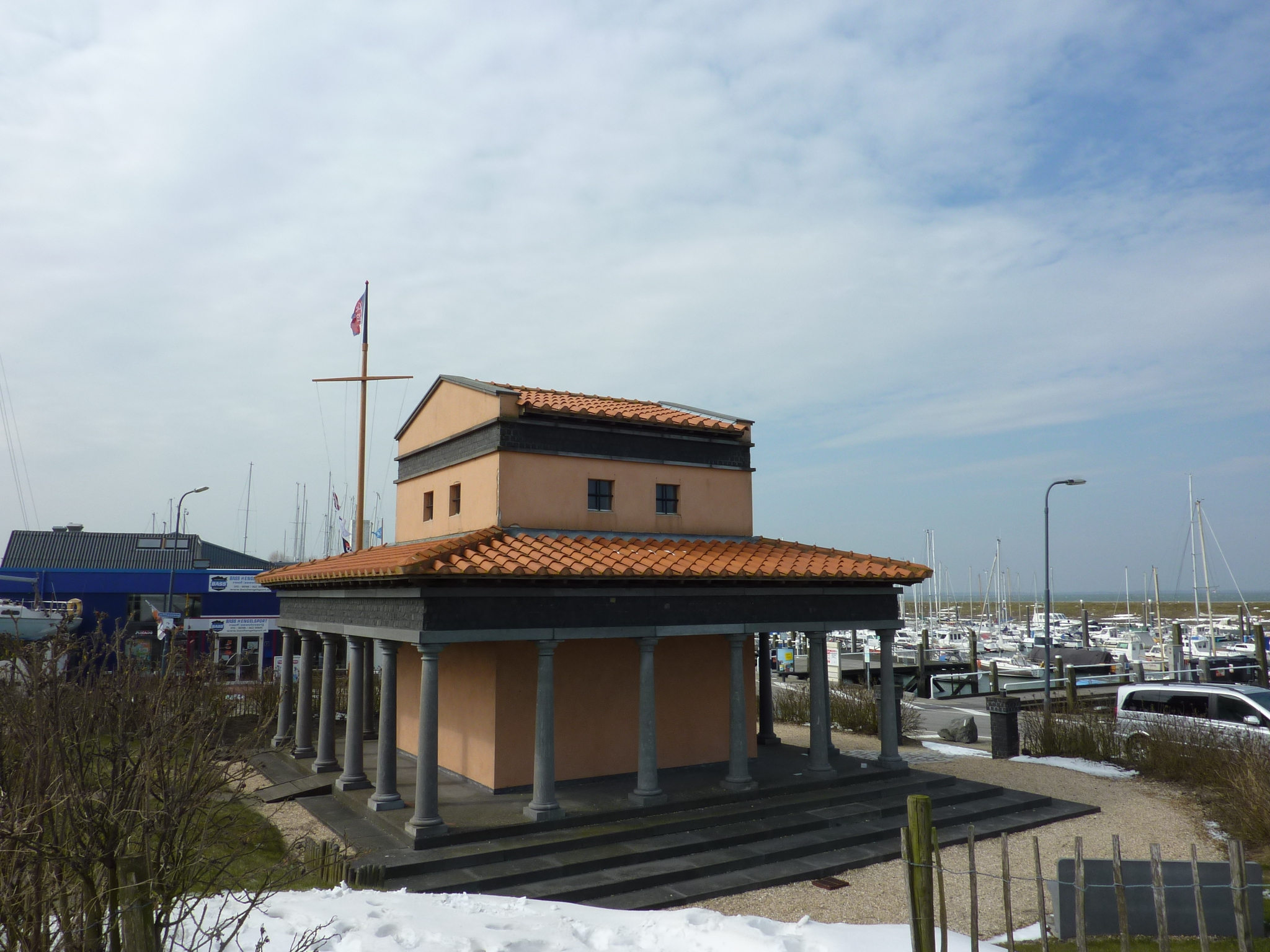
Replica of the temple of Nehalennia at Colijnsplaat

There was a temple for the goddess Nehalennia here. Little is known about Nehalennia, but she must have been a Celtic or Germanic goddess, with power over trade and seafaring. Many travelers visited Ganventa on their journey, and prayed to Nehalennia for a safe journey over sea. The large number of altar stones found indicates that Ganventa was a major site for the worship of the goddess. Altars and remains of the temple were lifted out of the Eastern Scheldt in 1970. In 2005, a replica of the Gallo-Roman temple in Colijnsplaat was opened to the public.

== Finds after 1970 ==
On 14 April 1970m fisherman K. J. Bout found parts of an altar to Nehalennia in his nets while fishing near Colijnsplaat. Focused searches in 1970, 1971, and 1974 resulted in the find of about 240 altars and statues, votive stones and remains of a Roman building. These are now stored and displayed in the National Museum of Antiquities in Leiden. These were found in the Schaar of Colijnsplaat, a fairway in the Eastern Scheldt, where the temple of Nehalennia once stood.

The names of the persons who dedicated the statues and altars show that they were merchants from Italy, Cologne, Trier and Britain. They traded in salt, fish sauce, and textiles. Other wares included ceramics from the area around the Rhine, terracotta figurines from Cologne and Trier, and wine from Southern France and the Mosel. One inscription found translates to: "Before Nehalennia, Marcus Exingius Agricola, citizen of Trier, salt merchant in Cologne, has fulfilled his promise, willing and with reason." The majority of the votive offerings were donated by merchants to beseech the goddess for safe passage to Britannia.

In the period after the year 300, the temple disappeared into the Schaar of Colijnsplaat, near the settlement of Ganventa. Since 1999, a group of Flemish amateur archaeologists belonging to the Landelijke Werkgroep Archeologie Onder Water (National Work Group of Underwater Archaeology) has worked to map the bottom of the sea, around the location where the temple disappeared beneath the waves. A replica of the temple was built in Colijnsplaat in 2004.
