= Twilight of the Gods (TV series) =

American-French adult animated television series

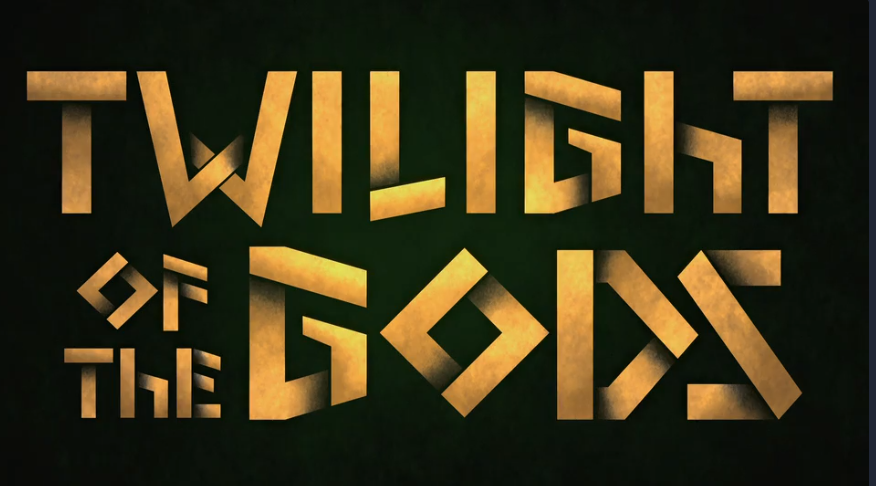
- Created by: Zack Snyder; Jay Oliva; Eric Carrasco
- Showrunner: Jay Oliva
- Voices of: Sylvia Hoeks; Stuart Martin; Paterson Joseph
- Composers: Hans Zimmer; Omer Benyamin; Steven Doar
- Countries of origin: United States; France
- Original language: English
- No. of seasons: 1
- No. of episodes: 8

Production
- Executive producers: Zack Snyder; Deborah Snyder; Wesley Coller; Jay Oliva
- Producers: Sherry Gunther Shugerman; Eric Carrasco
- Running time: 27–42 minutes
- Production companies: Stone Quarry Animation; Xilam Animation; Netflix Animation Studios

Original release
- Network: Netflix
- Release: September 19, 2024

Twilight of the Gods is an adult animated television series based on Norse mythology. It features the voices of Sylvia Hoeks, Stuart Martin, Paterson Joseph, Pilou Asbæk, Rahul Kohli, Birgitte Hjort Sørensen, Jamie Clayton, Peter Stormare, Kristofer Hivju and Thea Sofie Loch Næss in main roles.

Co-produced by American company Stone Quarry Animation and French studio Xilam Animation, the series premiered on Netflix on September 19, 2024.

In November 2025, Netflix canceled the series after one season.

== Voice cast and characters ==
- Sylvia Hoeks as Sigrid, a half-human, half-Jötunn warrior who swears revenge on Thor after he interrupts her wedding and slaughters her clan.
- Stuart Martin as Leif, a human king and Sigrid's lover who joins her quest for vengeance.
- Paterson Joseph as Loki
- Pilou Asbæk as Thor, the bloodthirsty and wrathful god of thunder who unleashes his wrath on Sigrid and Leif's wedding.
- Rahul Kohli as Egill
- Birgitte Hjort Sørensen as Hervor
- Hakeem Kae-Kazim as Baldr
- Peter Franzén as Glaumar
- Paget Brewster as Jarnglumra
- Susan Denaker as Geitla
- Josefin Asplund as Fenja / Menja
- Ben Prendergast as Fjolverkr / Somr / Heimdall
- Jamie Chung as Hel
- Jamie Clayton as Áile, the Seid-Kona
- Peter Stormare as Ulfr
- Kristofer Hivju as Andvari
- John Noble as Odin
- Ray Porter as Jorg / Bolverkr
- Morla Gorrondona as Marja
- Roger Craig Smith as Bjorn
- Corey Stoll as Hrafnkel
- Lauren Cohan as Inge
- Thea Sofie Loch Næss as Thyra
- Tracy Ifeachor as Freya
- Anya Chalotra as Sif
- Ólafur Darri Ólafsson as King Tiwaz / First Wolf
- Jessica Henwick as Sandraudiga
- Dave B. Mitchell as Fáfnir
- Yetide Badaki as Dahl
- Tove Lo as Jörmungandr
- Helena Mattsson as Angboda
- Tómas Lemarquis as Odric "Odd"

== Episodes ==
No.	Title	Directed by	Written by	Original release date
1	"The Bride–Price"	Zack Snyder	Eric Carrasco	September 19, 2024
After meeting and falling in love in battle, the half-giant Sigrid becomes engaged to King Leif of the Völsung Viking clan. After making love in the longhouse he built for her, Sigrid expresses her wish to marry in her homeland of Jötunheim among her family. After retrieving his father's sword from his tomb to bless the wedding, Leif and Sigrid travel to Jötunheim. Sigrid's father, the giant Glaumar, is impressed by Leif's gift of seeds to repair their farmlands that were pillaged by the Aesir god Odin. The wedding is interrupted by the Aesir gods Thor and his brother Baldr who were seeking the escaped frost giant Loki, who was hiding nearby in disguise. Disbelieving their claims of ignorance, Thor massacres the entire clan, leaving only Leif and Sigrid alive when Baldr mercifully tricks Thor into believing they are dead. Sigrid swears she will kill Thor and is summoned to Hel by Loki who offers his assistance.
2	"Heretic Spear"	Jay Oliva	Caitlin Parrish	September 19, 2024
Loki and his daughter Hel advise Sigrid to acquire god-killing iron from the dwarf Andvari, and an army from the Vanir. Along with Leif, Sigrid then seeks out five warriors to aid her quest. After recruiting her friend, the shieldmaiden Hervor, and Leif's slave, the poet Egill, they seek out a witch. The witch, known as the Seid-Kona, explains that she inherited her powers from her mother who received them from the Vanir goddess Freya. She volunteers her follower, the Wolf-Man Ulfr, for their quest and soon joins them herself. After traveling to the forges of Niðavellir, Loki aids the group in bypassing the souls of betrayed women who guard the gates. Andvari offers the group god-killing weapons but warns that wielding them will curse their souls. Sigrid takes the spear named Antler, the Seid-Kona twin daggers, Hervor a sword, and Leif an axe. Andvari chooses to join the group as their last recruit. Sigrid then throws herself into the dead river where the betrayed women use their pain to make her skin harder than metal. Nearby, the ravens Thought and Memory spy on them for the Aesir.
3	"You Will Gladden His Ravens"	Tim Divar & Andrew Tamandl	Peter Aperlo	September 19, 2024
In a flashback, Thor is seduced by Loki's daughter Jörmungandr, to bind their fates and Baldr warns Thor that Sigrid is seeking his death. Thor defies Odin and leaves to find Sigrid. Loki makes a deal with Freya that the Vanir will welcome Sigrid if she proves worthy. Sigrid and her group search in vain for Vanaheim which had been hidden ever since Odin defeated the Vanir and stole their powers of prophecy, the immortality granting Apples of Idunn, and took Freya as his bride. Ulfr reports they are being followed by Odin's huntsmen, the Bolverkr, and Sigrid is frustrated when Loki ignores her summons. Hervor worries if they fight against the Aesir they may not be welcomed to Valhalla where her three sons are waiting for her and the group soon evades the Bolverkr to shelter at a farm. The farmers quickly betray the group who slay them before freeing the farmer's slave Thyra. Thor chases them but is prevented from following them when Thyra opens a portal to Vanaheim, which no god can enter without starting another war. Thyra reveals herself to be a servant of Vanaheim's king and deems the group worthy to enter.
4	"The Worm"	Dave Hartman & Andrew Tamandl	Eric Carrasco & Caitlin Parrish	September 19, 2024
Having been forced to retreat to Asgard, Thor encounters Sandraudiga, the Goddess of Defeat, and asks for her help. King Tiwaz of Vanaheim refuses to help Sigrid as he cannot risk war with the Aesir. With Loki whispering in her ear, Sigrid offers to return with the Apples of Idunn to cure the Vanir's withered bodies in exchange for their help. Tiwaz agrees and sends Thyra with them and Leif grants Egill his freedom. Unsure of his future, Egill goes to the Seid-Kona who witnesses his death in battle at Asgard and tells him to return home. After reaching the orchard where the Apples of Idunn grow, its guardian Fáfnir is revealed to have once been a dwarf prince and Andvari's friend who conspired with Loki to seize the throne and was cursed after stealing Andvari's gold. After a battle, Fáfnir is defeated, ending his curse and turning him back into a dwarf. Andvari chooses to spare Fáfnir but Leif cuts off his head anyway. The group returns the apples to Tiwaz but the Vanir become sick as the apples had been poisoned by Loki. Tiwaz calls for their deaths, and Leif stays behind to allow the others to escape.
5	"The Scapegoat God"	Tim Divar & Andrew Tamandl	Peter Aperlo	September 19, 2024
In a flashback, Odin sends Thor to capture Loki's children; Jörmungandr is thrown into the sea, Fenrir is chained for eternity in Asgard, and Hel is banished to the underworld. Loki appears before Leif and reveals that the Vanir imprisoned him in the skull of Hoenir, an Aesir god half-murdered by Odin whose broken mind overflows with madness and triggers them both to experience a traumatic memory. Loki helps Leif escape the memory of murdering Egill's father before Leif helps Loki escape the memory of him allowing Jörmungandr to seduce Thor. Loki admonishes how he has spent eternity as a scapegoat, a convenient god who others blame for their sins. Having escaped from the Vanir, Sigrid and her group encounter the First Wolves who grant Ulfr a favor as he wears the skin of one of their pack. The Vanir eventually track Sigrid to Hoenir but are met in battle by the combined Jötun tribes who were convinced by Egill after he told them of Sigrid's story. Sigrid beheads Hoenir, freeing Leif. Loki takes credit for the poisoned Apples of Idunn, ending the conflict. The Vanir, Jötun tribes and Sigrid's group make a pact to wage war on Asgard.
6	"Now Hear Of..."	Dave Hartman & Andrew Tamandl	Eric Carrasco & Caitlin Parrish	September 19, 2024
Sigrid's group and their allies take mushrooms while sharing tales. An old storyteller tells of Fenja and Menja, Jötun sisters who were chained to a ship to grind salt for a greedy king and that after the ship sank, the oceans tasted of salt. The Jötun leader Dahl tells of the unnamed giant who built Asgard's walls and wagered Freya's hand in marriage if he could finish within one year. To ensure he lost, Loki transformed into a mare and seduced the giant's stallion Svadilfari, causing the giant to be killed by Thor and Loki produced Sleipnir. Egill recounts how he fell in love with the man Odric and was forced to slay Odric's brother after they were discovered. When Ulfr refuses to speak, the Seid-Kona uses magic to force him to confess to cannibalizing a child to survive. Sigrid tells of not fitting in with her giant family and how she met Leif. Having come to care for each other, Egill makes love with the Seid-Kona, who reveals her name to be Áile, while Sigrid and Leif seduce Thyra. The old storyteller reveals himself to Sigrid as Odin in disguise and warns her that revenge will cost her life.
7	"If I Had a Hammer"	Jay Oliva	Caitlin Parrish & Peter Aperlo	September 19, 2024
Thor awakens after having seduced Sandraudiga just as Sigrid's army approaches Asgard. A battle begins between Sigrid's army and the Aesir, where Sigrid and Dahl use giant magic to undermine Asgard's wall. Meanwhile, Loki plots with his children to save them from Ragnarök by ensuring that Sigrid kills Thor, which will prevent their prophesied deaths. After a day of fighting, Sandraudiga calls the Valkyries to collect the dead, though they ignore the bodies of Sigrid's army. That night, while Leif is asleep, Sigrid leaves him behind so he will survive and Áile does the same with Egill. Along with Hervor and Andvari, they sneak through Asgard's wall. They meet with Freya who leads them to kill Thor, but he awakens and captures them. Leif notices Sigrid's absence and soon arrives with the others and Loki distracts Thor so they can escape Asgard. Andvari attempts to get revenge on Loki for Fáfnir's curse, but Loki kills him. Leif confronts Sigrid about her recklessness and she tells him they can never marry as she is consumed by vengeance. After tying her mistletoe wedding crown to Antler as a symbol of resolve, she wounds Leif's leg so he cannot follow her.
8	"Song of Sigrid"	Zack Snyder	Eric Carrasco	September 19, 2024
Leif tells Thyra of Sigrid's departure and Thyra admits that she had fallen in love with her. Loki joins Sigrid in battle where Thor kills and brutalizes Tiwaz. Baldr summons the Einherjar from Valhalla to aid the Aesir and Ulfr transforms into a giant wolf and summons the First Wolves to combat them. Áile meets with Odin and consumes his raven Memory as a sacrifice so she can give him a vision of Ragnarök and a glimpse of a future where the world has forgotten him. Enraged by what he saw, Odin mortally wounds Áile. Egill infiltrates Asgard and finds Áile who resurrects as a goddess before the pair flee Asgard with Freya's help. Sigrid and her allies engage Thor who defeats them all, killing Ulfr and Hervor. The Valkyries refuse to take Hervor to Valhalla, though Hel collects her instead. Thor demands Sigrid's surrender, who refuses and attempts to kill Thor with Antler, but Baldr dies saving his brother as the mistletoe atop Antler breaks his invulnerability. Distraught at Baldr's death, Thor allows Freya to take him to Valhalla, and Loki murders Sigrid to send her after him. In Valhalla, Thor tells Sigrid that her journey is just beginning.

== Production ==
=== Development ===
Twilight of the Gods was first conceived by Jay Oliva during an off-the-cuff phone call. John Derderian from Netflix called Oliva during a writer's summit for his previous Netflix animated series, Trese, to ask if Oliva knew anything about Norse mythology. Oliva came up with a story on the spot and pitched the idea to Derderian. Netflix loved the idea and contacted Oliva again to set it up, asking if Oliva would like to work with previous collaborator Zack Snyder, who was also already working with Netflix on a number of projects. The two developed the idea further, then brought on Eric Carrasco as head writer, who would eventually write the scripts with his writing team.

"Eric, Zack, and I would sit together and discuss the series as a whole. Eric would write out a breakdown summary of each episode based on what we all had agreed upon. Then, Zack and I would add our notes and then Eric would then hand it off to his writing team or write it himself." In 2019, Zack Snyder revealed he had plans for an animated series based on Norse mythology. That July, Snyder and Olivia were announced as directors, with Olivia serving as showrunner. Two years later, on June 10, 2021, during Netflix's Geeked Week event, the title was finally revealed to be Twilight of the Gods, and the cast list was revealed by Snyder and Rahul Kohli. Sylvia Hoeks, Stuart Martin, Pilou Asbæk, John Noble, Paterson Joseph, Rahul Kohli, Jamie Clayton, Kristofer Hivju, Peter Stormare, Jamie Chung, Lauren Cohan, and Corey Stoll and their roles were revealed.

On June 24, 2021, The Hollywood Reporter announced the formation of KRAKN Animation, which would be a new joint venture spearheaded by Jay Oliva and Louis-Simon Menard, the CEOs of Lex + Otis and Digital Dimension Entertainment Group, respectively. The new studio would create the animation for Twilight of the Gods. One of the writers of the show, Eric Carrasco, stated that the animation of the show would still take some time as of April 10, 2022, but that the impactful artistry would be worth the wait. Carrasco was later confirmed to be a producer for the series alongside the announcement that Xilam Animation was one of the studios behind the animation. During the Rebel Moon promotional tour, Zack and Deborah Snyder revealed that the series was set to be completed in the summer of 2024. They provided a basic synopsis for the first time since the series' announcement, confirmed the eight episode count, and estimated a late-2024 release date.

In April 2024, director at Xilam Animation, Slimane Aniss posted that animation had been completed in March. He also confirmed that the series would utilize a 2D style. Later that month, Netflix revealed that they'd be presenting Twilight of the Gods at the French Annecy International Animation Film Festival, also revealing that the series would finally release in the fall. Annecy Festival took place June 9–15, 2024, while Twilight of the Gods was shown specifically on June 12. On April 26, 2024, Sherry Gunther Shugerman, a producer for the series, confirmed via LinkedIn that post production had been completed the day before and that the series would be releasing in September. In June 2024, it was announced by Collider that Jessica Henwick had joined the cast as Sandraudiga.

Many of the character designs were created in house by a team of artists. Snyder said around 50 designs were done in various styles, including 3D versions. They wanted the animation style to feel unique to this series, and not be chasing anime and Pixar.

=== Casting and voice recording ===
Alongside the series' announcement, Sylvia Hoeks, Stuart Martin, Pilou Asbæk, John Noble, Paterson Joseph, Rahul Kohli, Jamie Clayton, Kristofer Hivju, Peter Stormare, Jamie Chung, Lauren Cohan and Corey Stoll, were cast as the ensemble cast.

Most of the voice recording was done during the COVID-19 pandemic, and was remotely completed around the world in 23 locations using special kits for the actors to do at home. Rahul Kohli finished voice recording back in 2020/2021. The actors would record into a camera to make the animation process easier for the animators.

=== Music ===
In June 2024, it was revealed that Hans Zimmer would compose the series' music.

== Release ==
Twilight of the Gods was released on Netflix on September 19, 2024.

=== Promotion ===
In June 2024, Twilight of the Gods was showcased at the Annecy International Animation Film Festival in France as part of Netflix's animation presentation. The event featured exclusive footage from the series, with Zack Snyder, Deborah Snyder, and Jay Oliva participating in the presentation.

== Reception ==
The review aggregator website Rotten Tomatoes reported a 76% approval rating with an average rating of 7/10, based on 17 critic reviews. The website's critics consensus reads, "Twilight of the Gods delivers on the godly carnage it promises with vivid animation, although its commitment to Ragna-rocking all the time saps some of its emotional depth." Metacritic, which uses a weighted average, assigned a score of 63 out of 100 based on 9 critics, indicating "generally favorable" reviews.

In 2024, Bubbleblabber included the series in their list of "Best Adult Animated Series for 2024" and Samsung Magazine reported that the series was one of the "5 best series on Netflix in September 2024".
