= Nehalennia =

Goddess

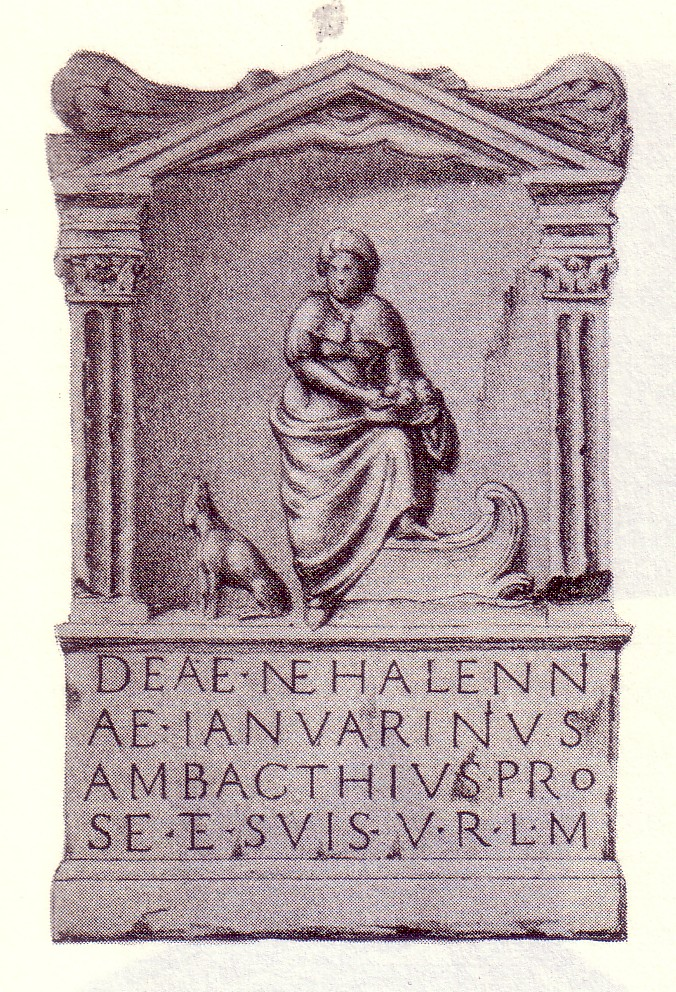
An altar for Nehalennia in Domburg, Netherlands. On her right is a dog and in her hands a basket of apples.

Nehalennia (also Nehalenia, Nehalaenniae, Nehalaenia, Nehellenia) is a tutelary goddess who was worshipped in 2nd- and 3rd-century Gallia Belgica by travelers, especially sailors and traders, at the mouth of the Scheldt. Her origin is unclear, perhaps Germanic or Celtic. She is attested on and depicted upon numerous votive altars discovered around what is now the province of Zeeland, the Netherlands, where the Schelde River flowed into the North Sea. Worship of Nehalennia dates back at least to the 2nd century BC and veneration of the goddess continued to flourish in northwestern Europe in the 2nd and 3rd centuries AD. Nehalennia has experienced a modern-day revival, particularly within Dutch paganism.

== Name ==
While the meaning of the name Nehalennia remains disputed, linguists agree that its origin is not Latin. Given the locations where most references and artifacts have been found, her name is likely from either a Germanic or Celtic language. Gutenbrunner (1936) related it to Proto-Germanic *nehwa "close", but could not explain the rest of the name. Gysseling (1960) believed that the name was neither Celtic nor Germanic, rather stemming from the Proto-Indo-European root *neiH- "to lead". He could not trace the rest of the name. De Stempel (2004) links her name with Welsh halein "salt" and heli "sea", proposing a Celtic origin. She deconstructs the name as a combination of Celtic *halen– "sea" and *ne- "on, at". Finally, *-ja is a suffix forming a feminine noun. The meaning would be "she who is at the sea".

== Worship ==
Much about the worship of Nehalennia remains a mystery. Given her attributes (horn of plenty, apples), she was probably originally a fertility goddess. Around the year 200 CE, the time from which her altars and statues date, Nehalennia was mainly worshipped as the protector of travellers and traders in the North Sea area.

The worship of Nehalennia was concentrated in temples in Ganventa (north of Colijnsplaat) and Domburg. The temple in Ganventa was dedicated exclusively to the goddess, while other (Roman) gods were also worshipped in Domburg. Statues of the supreme god Jupiter, Neptune and the goddess Victoria have been found there (Domburg).

Other indigenous deities that were locally venerated at that time are: Burorina, Hludana, Hurstrga, Sandraudiga, Seneucaega, Vagdavercustis and Viradecdis.

== Inscriptions ==
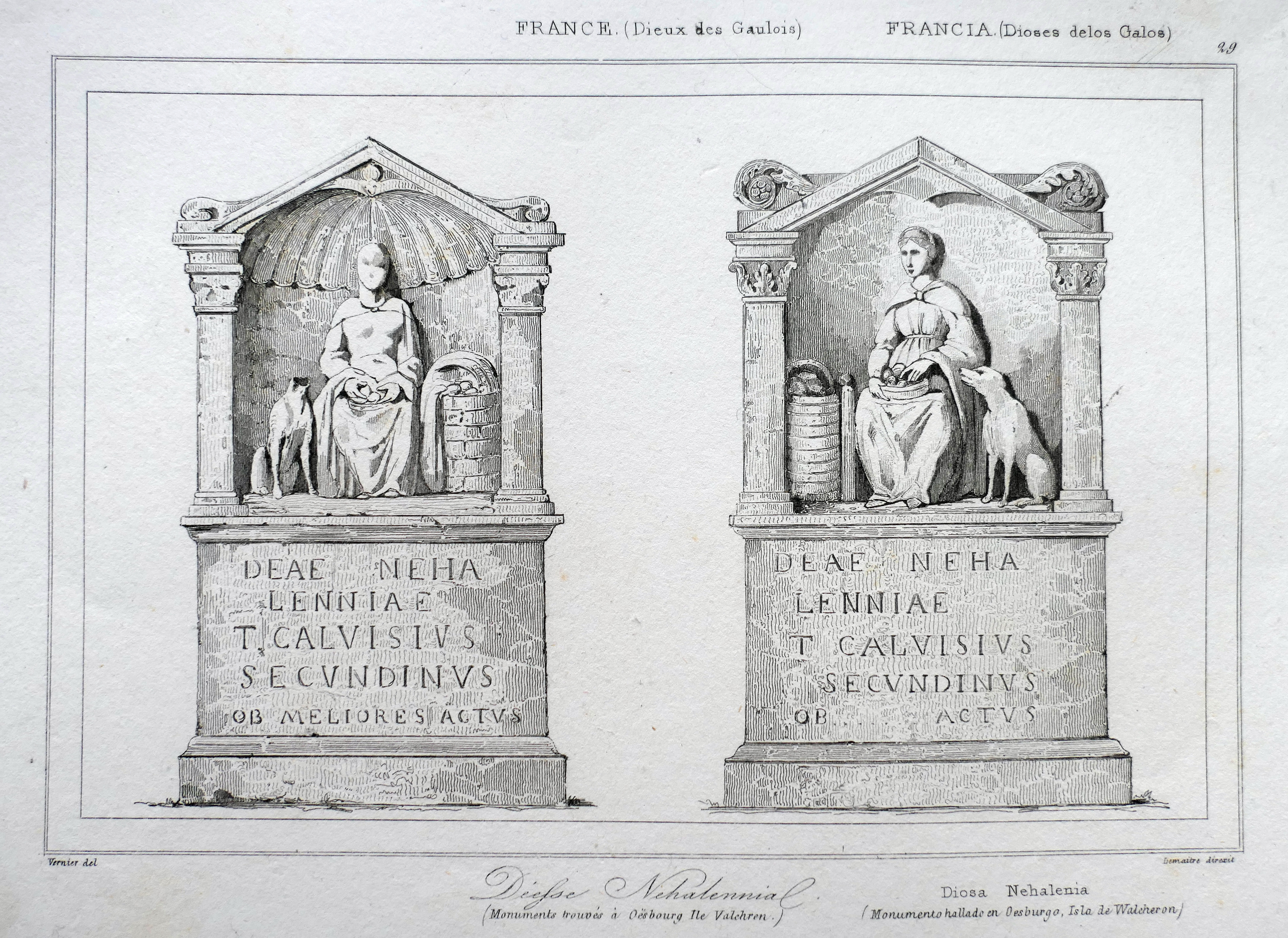
Drawings of 2 more altars dedicated to Nehalennia

Nehalennia is attested on 28 inscriptions discovered in 1645 in the Dutch town of Domburg on the Zeeland coast, when a storm eroded dunes. The remains of a temple were revealed that was devoted to the previously unattested goddess Nehalennia. Beginning in 1970, numerous altars, remains of female sculptures and related artifacts were found near in the town of Colijnsplaat, including roof tiles and remains of the temple devoted to Nehalennia that was in a former town, now lost. Two other temple remains have been found in the Cologne-Deutz area of what is now Cologne, Germany.

Dutch archaeologist J.E. Bogaers and Belgian linguist Maurits Gysseling, in their joint publication Over de naam van de godin Nehalennia ("On the name of the goddess Nehalennia"), listed several different forms of the name that appear in inscriptions. While Nehalennia is by far the most common spelling, Nehalenia and Nehalaennia both appear a few times. Gysseling characterizes these two forms as Latinisations of the more archaic Nehalennia. Several sporadic spellings, which are attested once each, were considered by Bogaers as non-standard or rejected as misread, due to the poor state of some of the inscriptions. Gysseling holds that some spellings are a transliteration, an attempt to approximate the pronunciation of her name in Latin script, suggesting that the "h" may have been pronounced as some German ch sound. One of the numerous altars dredged up from the Oosterschelde near Colijnsplaat in 1970 features the spelling Nechalenia. It appears that spellings with 𐌝 are intentional and not due to damaged artifacts.

The Domburg inscriptions to Nehalennia inspired Marcus Zuerius van Boxhorn to produce a hasty etymology linking the name Nehalennia to an ancient Scythian. With the linguistic tools then available, Van Boxhorn attempted to bridge the already-known connections between European languages and modern Persian.

Her cult is almost certainly older than the period from which the altars originate.

A part of the enormous collection is on display in the National Museum of Antiquities (Netherlands).

== Depictions ==
Nehalennia is almost always depicted with marine symbols and a large, benign-looking dog at her feet. She must have been a Celtic or Germanic deity to whom was attributed power over trading, shipping, and possible horticulture and fertility. In sculptures and reliefs, she is depicted as a young woman, generally seated. Typically she wears a short cloak over her shoulders and chest. This garment is unique to her and therefore might have belonged to the costumes usual at that period in this region. Often she is accompanied by a dog; she has as attributes a basket of apples or bread loaves and ship parts. Hilda Ellis Davidson describes the votive objects:

Nehalennia, a Germanic goddess worshipped at the point where travellers crossed the North Sea from the Netherlands, is shown on many carved stones holding loaves and apples like a Mother Goddess, sometimes with a prow of a ship beside her, but also frequently with an attendant dog which sits looking up at her (Plate 5). This dog is on thirteen of the twenty-one altars recorded by Ada Hondius-Crone (1955:103), who describes it as a kind of greyhound.

Davidson further links the motif of the ship associated with Nehalennia with the Germanic Vanir pair of Freyr and Freyja as well as the Germanic goddess Nerthus. She notes that Nehalennia features some of the same attributes as the Matres.

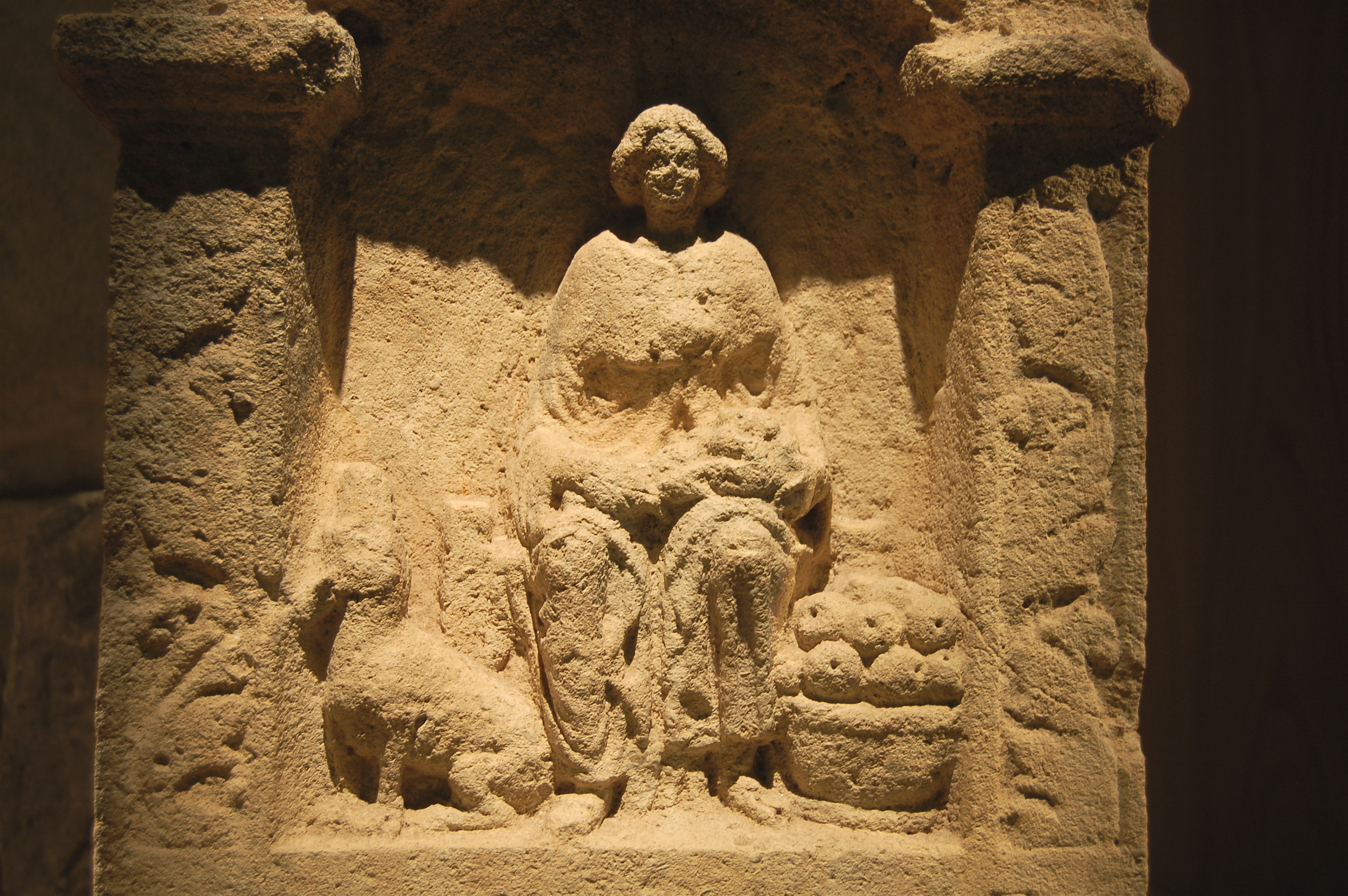
Relief of a seated Nehalennia between a dog and a basket of loaves

The loaves that Nehalennia is depicted with on her altars have been identified as duivekater, "oblong sacrificial loaves in the shape of a shin bone". Davidson says that loaves of this type may take the place of an animal sacrifice or animal victim, such as the boar-shaped loaf baked at Yule in Sweden. In Värmland, Sweden, "within living memory," there was a custom of grain from the last sheaf of the harvest customarily being used to bake a loaf in the shape of a little girl; this is subsequently shared by the whole household. Davidson provides further examples of elaborate harvest loaves in the shape of sheaves, and displayed in churches for the fertility of fields in Anglo-Saxon England, with parallels in Scandinavia and Ireland.

A depiction of an enthroned goddess with children at her breast, with lap dogs, or with baskets of fruit is characterized by Lothar Schwinden as a mother goddess (like the Gallo-Roman version of the Celtic Aveta).

In 2005, a replica of the temple was built in Colijnsplaat. The design of temple and its sculpture is based on the finds from the nearby area, as well as archaeological study of the type of sanctuaries in the Roman provinces of Gaul and Germania. For the reconstruction, authentic materials and techniques were used as much as possible.

== Temples ==
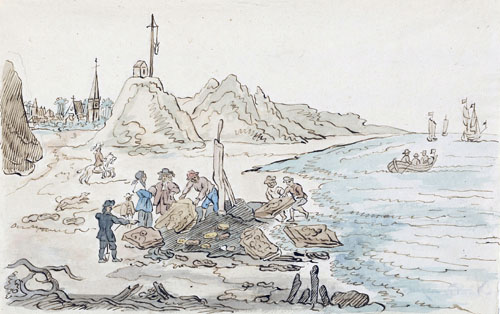
Illustration of the discovery of a Nehalennia temple in 1645 in Domburg, Netherlands, by A.C. Bonn, 1805

Religious practices surrounding Nehalennia were at their peak in the 2nd and 3rd centuries AD, at which time there were at least two or three temples located in the area of what is now Zeeland. At the time, this region on the sea coast was an important link for the trade between the Rhine area and Britain. It is known that the Morini, who lived on the North Sea coast, worshipped Nehalennia. Visitors came to worship from as far away as Besançon, France and Trier, Germany. Nehalennia had two sanctuaries or shrines, embellished with numerous altars: one at Domburg on the island of Walcheren, and another at Colijnsplaat on the shore of the Oosterschelde.

In August 2005, a replica of the Nehalennia temple near the lost town of Ganuenta was opened in Colijnsplaat.

== In popular culture ==
- In 1960, an asteroid, Asteroid 2462 or 6578 P-L, was named after the goddess.
- The name of the Stedelijk Gymnasium Middelburg was changed to Nehalennia in 1997.
- In Domburg, in addition to the Nehalenniaweg, you can also find Hotel Nehalennia.
- A viaduct over Rijksweg 11 near Alphen aan den Rijn (plaats) bears the name Nehalennia.
- The scientific name of the dragonfly genus dwarf damselfies is Nehalennia.
- The prehistoric fin whale Nehalaennia devossi is named after the goddess Nehalennia.

== See also ==
- Germanic paganism
- Iðunn, North Germanic goddess associated with apples
- Mythology of the Low Countries
- Oera Linda Book
