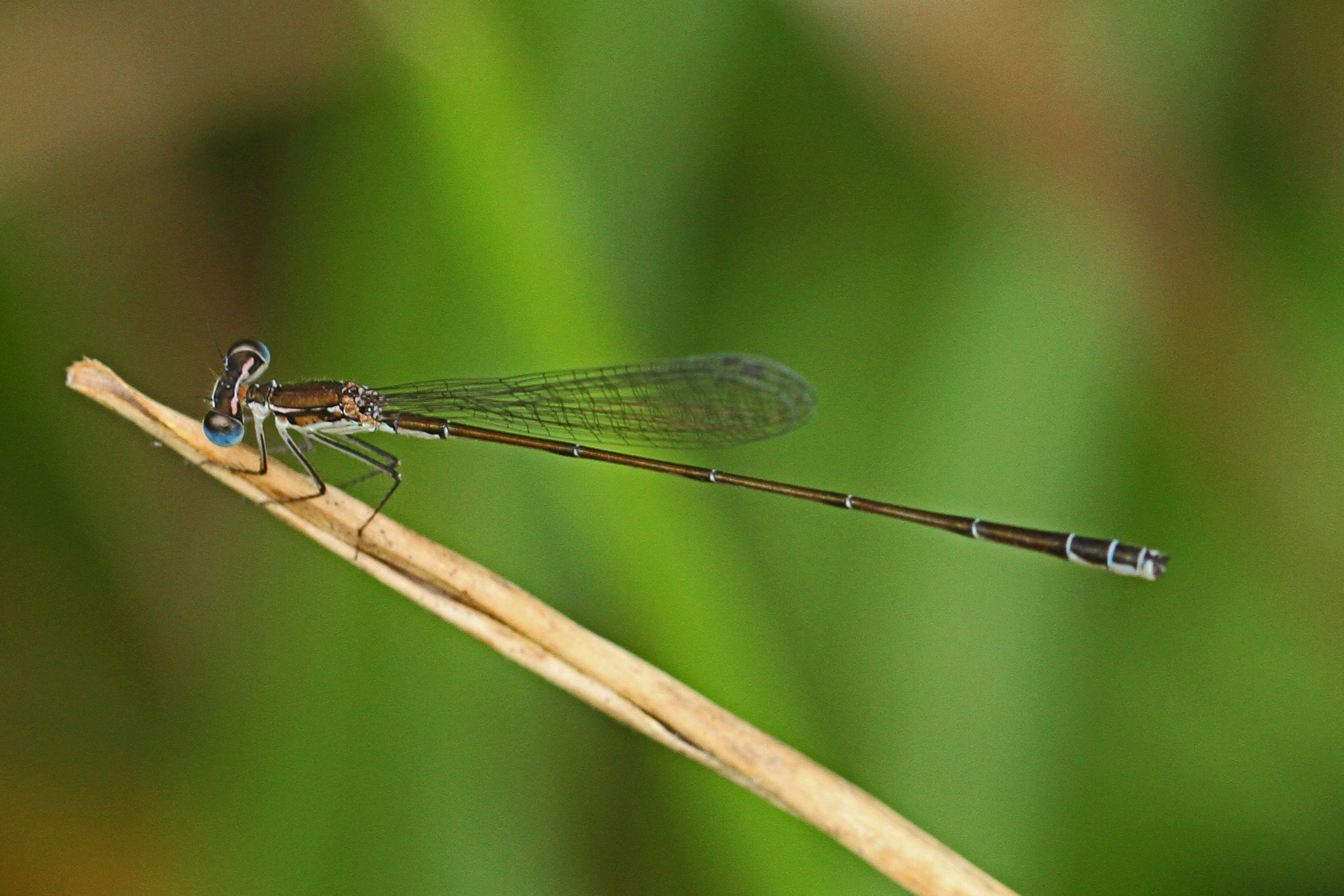

Conservation status
- Near Threatened (IUCN 3.1)

Scientific classification
- Kingdom: Animalia
- Phylum: Arthropoda
- Class: Insecta
- Order: Odonata
- Suborder: Zygoptera
- Family: Coenagrionidae
- Genus: Nehalennia
- Species: N. pallidula

Binomial name
- Nehalennia pallidula Calvert, 1913

= Nehalennia pallidula =

Species of damselfly

Nehalennia pallidula, the Everglades sprite, is a species of damselfly in the family Coenagrionidae. It is endemic to the United States, where it has been found only in Florida and Texas. Its natural habitats are swamps and freshwater marshes. It is threatened by habitat loss from water diversion, peat fires, and invasive species. It has a low level of detection due to its preference for dense vegetation and its small size.
