= Justia gens =

Ancient Roman family

The gens Justia was an obscure plebeian family at ancient Rome. No members of this gens are mentioned in ancient writers, but several are known from inscriptions.

== Origin ==
The nomen Justius is derived from the cognomen Jūstus, one of a class of surnames referring to the character or habits of an individual, in this case describing someone as "just", "fair", or "righteous".

== Praenomina ==
The only praenomina appearing in inscriptions of the Justii are Lucius and Gaius, the two most common names throughout Roman history.

== Members ==
This list includes abbreviated praenomina. For an explanation of this practice, see filiation.

- Justia L. l. Dica, a freedwoman named in an inscription from Forum Popilii in Cisalpine Gaul, dating from the first century BC.
- Gaius Justius Proculus, one of the aediles at Flavia Solva in Noricum, buried at the present site of Maribor, together with Orionia Maxima, perhaps his wife, in the late first century, or the first half of the second.
- Lucius Justius Valerianus, the heir of Quintus Junius Iullinus, a soldier in the fifteenth urban cohort at Rome, who was buried at Misenum some time in the late first century, or the first half of the second, aged thirty-four years, having served for sixteen years.
- Justius Optatus, named in a second- or third-century inscription found at Schuld, formerly part of Germania Inferior.
- Justia Ingenua, buried at the present site of Varhely, formerly part of Dacia, aged thirty, in a family sepulchre dedicated by her husband, Ulpius Dubitatus, and his brother, Gemellinus, for Ingenua, her daughter, Justia Sextilia, and the brothers' parents, Ulpius Gemellinus and Ulpia Dubitata, both aged sixty. The tomb dates from the early second century to the middle of the third.
- Justia Sextilia, the daughter of Ulpius Dubitatus and Justia Ingenua, buried at the present site of Varhely in a second or third century tomb built by Dubitatus and his brother, Gemellinus, for their parents, as well as Ulpius' wife and daughter.
- Justia Secundina, made an offering to Jupiter Optimus Maximus at Alba Julia in Dacia, between the early second and middle of the third century.
- Justius Attianus, a decurion who made an offering to the local deity at the present site of Osterburken, formerly part of Germania Superior, in the latter half of the second century, or the first half of the third.
- Gaius Justius, named in an inscription from Rome, dating to the third century, or the end of the second.
- Justius Frontinus, buried in a third-century tomb at Rome, aged thirty-four, was a soldier in the ninth cohort of the Praetorian Guard, in the century of Secundinus, having served for twelve years. He left Noricus Ulpius Maximianus as his heir.
- Justius Justus, buried at Celeia in Noricum, aged sixty, with a monument from his wife, Tutorina. Justius Tutorinus, presumably his son, is buried in the same sepulchre, which dates to the third century.
- Justius Tutorinus, probably the son of Justius Justus and Tutorina, was buried along with Justus in a third-century sepulchre dedicated by Tutorina at Celeia, aged forty.

=== Undated Justii ===
- Justius Junius Januarius, buried at Sufetula in Africa Proconsularis, aged forty.
- Justius Justinus, dedicated a tomb at Vienna in Gallia Narbonensis for his wife, Statoria, the daughter of Magnianus, and daughter, Justiola.
- Justius Justinus, together with his children, Justius Oceanus and Justia Florida, dedicated a tomb at the present site of Avolsheim, formerly part of Germania Superior, to his wife, Terentia Augustula.
- Justius Matutinus, the son of Justius Quintianus, with whom he was buried at Rome, in a tomb dedicated by his mother, Augustalia Faustina.
- Justius Mucianus, decurion at Augusta Treverorum in Gallia Belgica, where he was buried along with his wife, Aprilia Ursula, and son, Rustius Mucianus, with a monument dedicated by his daughter, Aprilia Paterna.
- Justia Nepotilla, a matron named in an inscription from Tibur in Latium, along with her daughter, Justia Praesidia.
- Lucius Justius L. f. Ponticus, the son of Lucius Justius Senilis, named in an inscription from Aquileia in Venetia and Histria.
- Justia Praesidia, the daughter of Justia Nepotilla, with whom she was buried at Tibur.
- Justius Quintianus, buried at Rome, along with his son, Justius Matutinus, in a tomb built by his wife, Augustalia Faustina.
- Lucius Justius Satto, together with Lucius Secundinius Moderatus, made an offering to Nehalennia at the present site of Domburg, formerly part of Gallia Belgica.
- Lucius Justius Senilis, the father of Lucius Justius Ponticus, named in an inscription from Aquileia.
- Justius Vatto, made an offering to Victoria at Eburodunum in Germania Superior.

== See also ==
- List of Roman gentes

== Bibliography ==
- Theodor Mommsen et alii, Corpus Inscriptionum Latinarum (The Body of Latin Inscriptions, abbreviated CIL), Berlin-Brandenburgische Akademie der Wissenschaften (1853–present).
- René Cagnat et alii, L'Année épigraphique (The Year in Epigraphy, abbreviated AE), Presses Universitaires de France (1888–present).
- George Davis Chase, "The Origin of Roman Praenomina", in Harvard Studies in Classical Philology, vol. VIII, pp. 103–184 (1897).
- John C. Traupman, The New College Latin & English Dictionary, Bantam Books, New York (1995).
