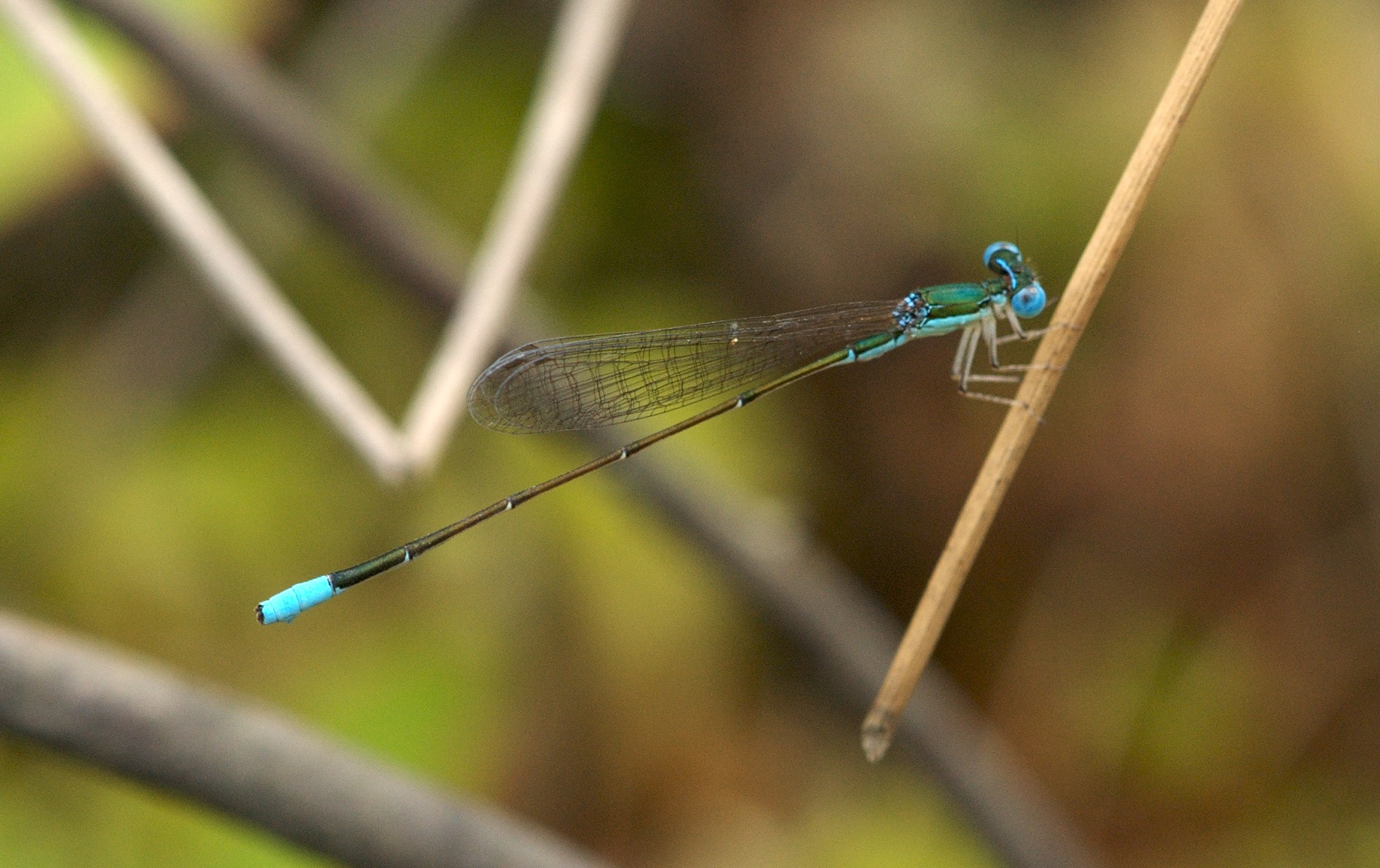

Conservation status
- Least Concern (IUCN 3.1)

Scientific classification
- Kingdom: Animalia
- Phylum: Arthropoda
- Class: Insecta
- Order: Odonata
- Suborder: Zygoptera
- Family: Coenagrionidae
- Genus: Nehalennia
- Species: N. gracilis

Binomial name
- Nehalennia gracilis Morse, 1895

= Nehalennia gracilis =

Species of damselfly

Nehalennia gracilis, the sphagnum sprite, is a species of narrow-winged damselfly in the family Coenagrionidae. It is found in North America.

The IUCN conservation status of Nehalennia gracilis is "LC", least concern, with no immediate threat to the species' survival. The population is stable.
