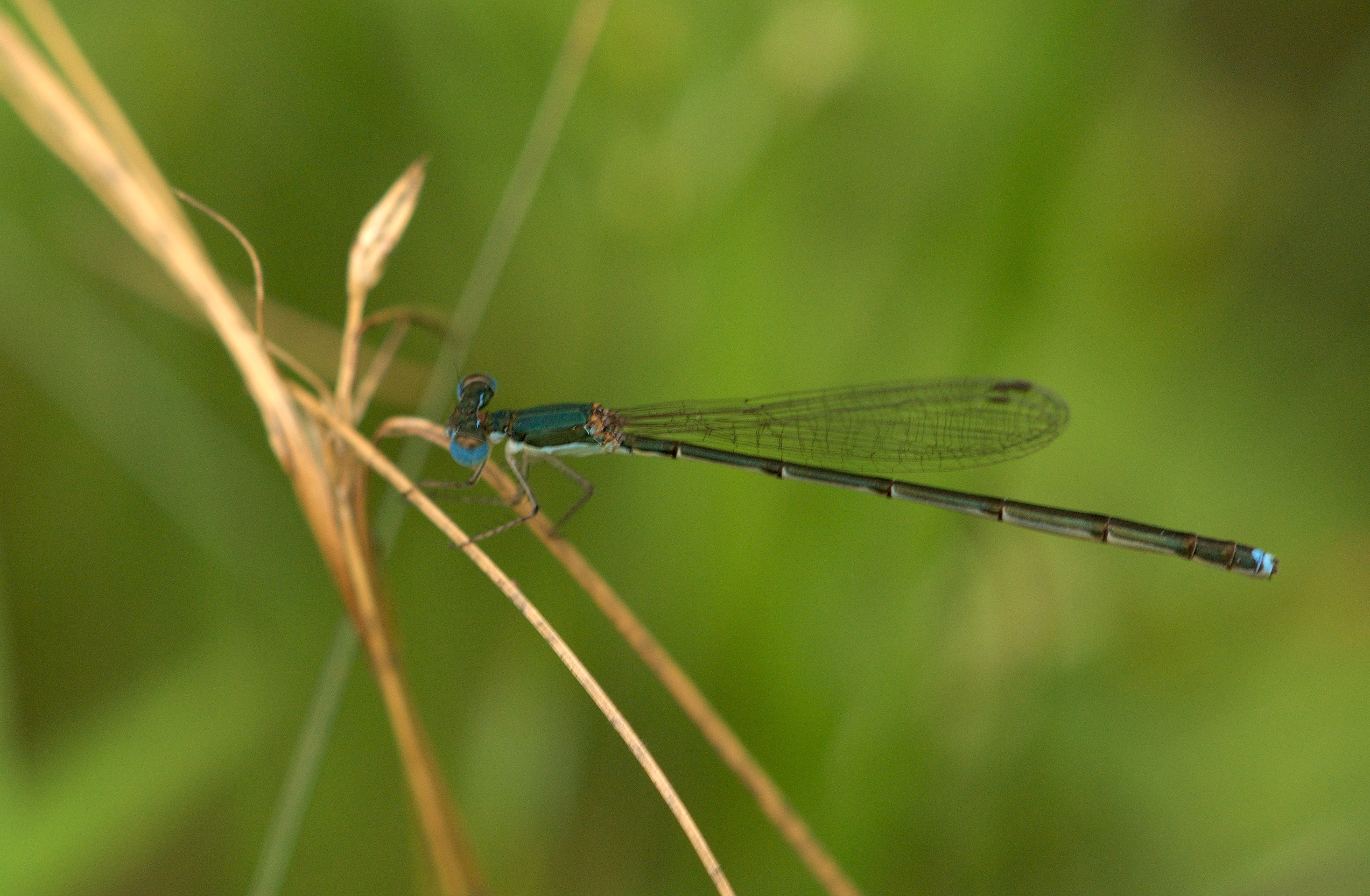

Conservation status
- Least Concern (IUCN 3.1)

Scientific classification
- Domain: Eukaryota
- Kingdom: Animalia
- Phylum: Arthropoda
- Class: Insecta
- Order: Odonata
- Suborder: Zygoptera
- Family: Coenagrionidae
- Genus: Nehalennia
- Species: N. integricollis

Binomial name
- Nehalennia integricollis Calvert, 1913

= Nehalennia integricollis =

Species of damselfly

Nehalennia integricollis, the southern sprite, is a species of narrow-winged damselfly in the family Coenagrionidae. It is found in North America.

The IUCN conservation status of Nehalennia integricollis is "LC", least concern, with no immediate threat to the species' survival. The population is stable.

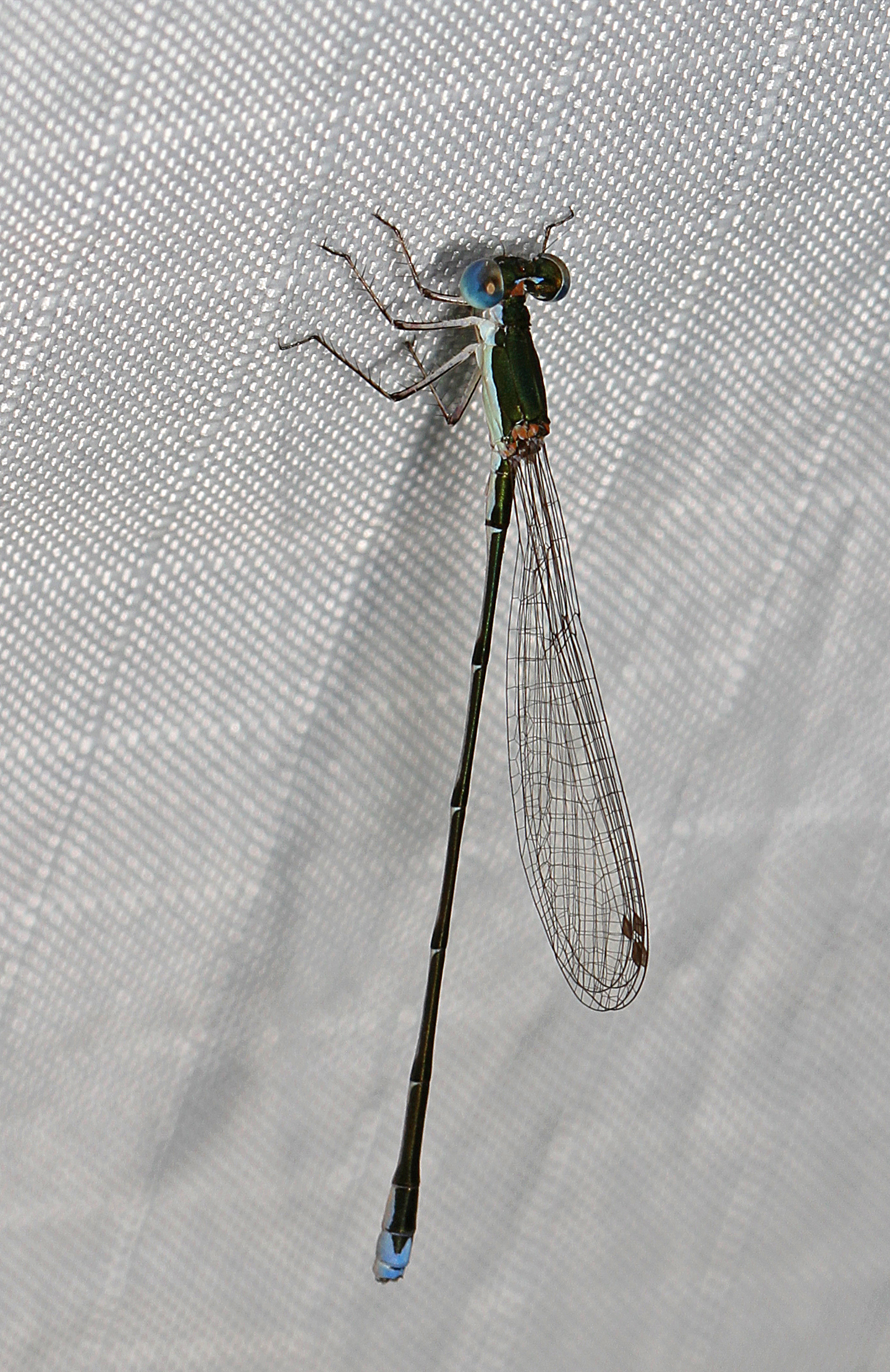
Southern sprite, Nehalennia integricollis
