= Hludana =

Tribes of ancient Germany

Hludana (or Dea Hludana) is a Germanic goddess attested in five ancient Latin inscriptions from the Rhineland and Frisia, all dating from 197–235 AD.

Based on the prevalence of *hlud- as an element of Frankish war-leader names, she is believed to have been the goddess of the initial organization of the Franks, which would have been at first a clandestine organization of officers in the Frankish auxiliaries of the Roman border guards; hence the secrecy enshrouding the formation of the Franks. Etymologically the word means "Fame," a suitable name for the meaning of "bold" for Franks. The Franks first appear as rebels in the Roman army. Subsequently they were a substantial part of it.

Three of these inscriptions come from the lower Rhine (CIL XIII, 8611; CIL XIII, 8723; CIL XIII, 8661), one from Münstereifel (CIL XIII, 7944) and one from Beetgum, Frisia (CIL XIII, 8830). The name appears as Hluθena on the Iversheim inscription from Münstereifel, and as Hlucena on that from Monterberg in the lower Rhine. The name is abbreviated in an inscription from Nijmegen on the lower Rhine ([H]lud.); it appears as Hludana in the inscriptions from Xanten (lower Rhine) and Beetgum. The Beetgum inscription, dedicated by a group of fishermen, originally accompanied a carving of a seated goddess, of which only the bottom can now be seen. On etymological grounds, the name Hludana is closely related to Old Greek κλυδων and κλυδωνα (kludoon(a) 'high waves, rough water') and the Ancient Greek-derived Euroclydon, meaning a violent north-eastern wind. The linguist Walther Kuhn suggested that it might be derived from Poseidon's spouse Kleito, as mentioned in Plato's dialogues. The name of Poseidon is etymologically connected to the Frisian-Norse god Forseti.

There is no proven connection between Hludana and Holda. Jacob Grimm suggested in Deutsche Mythologie that Hludana was to be identified with the Norse earth-goddess Hlóðyn.
