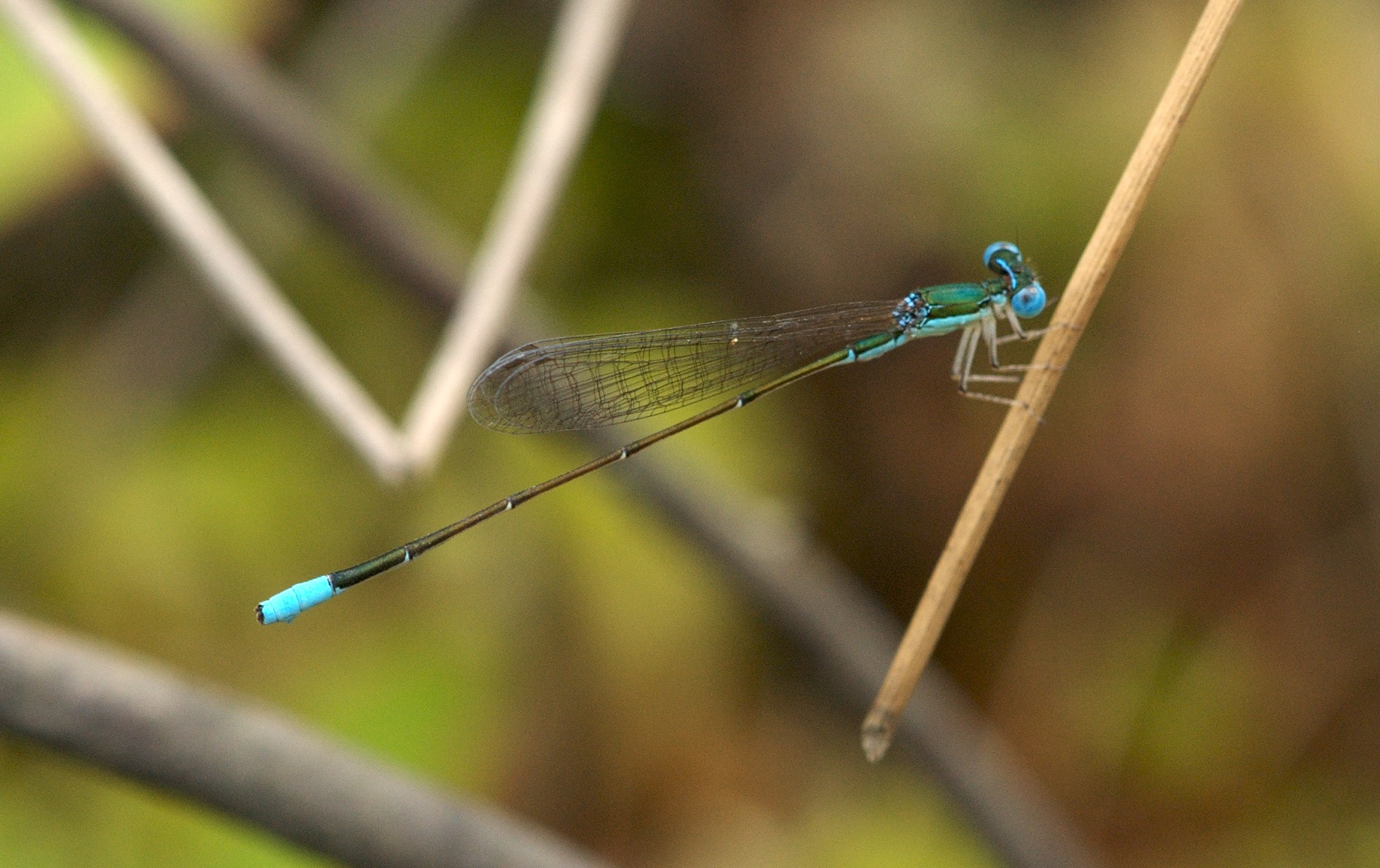
- Nehalennia gracilis

Scientific classification
- Kingdom: Animalia
- Phylum: Arthropoda
- Clade: Pancrustacea
- Class: Insecta
- Order: Odonata
- Suborder: Zygoptera
- Family: Coenagrionidae
- Genus: Nehalennia; Selys, 1850

= Nehalennia (damselfly) =

Genus of damselflies

Nehalennia is a genus of very small damselflies in the family Coenagrionidae. Most of the species are commonly known as Sprites. One species, N. speciosa occurs in Eurasia; the rest in North and South America.

This genus contains the following six species:

- Nehalennia gracilis Morse, 1895 – sphagnum sprite
- Nehalennia integricollis Calvert, 1913 – southern sprite
- Nehalennia irene (Hagen, 1861) – sedge sprite
- Nehalennia minuta (Selys in Sagra, 1857) – tropical sprite
- Nehalennia pallidula Calvert, 1913 – Everglades sprite
- Nehalennia speciosa (Charpentier, 1840) – pygmy damselfly, sedgling
