= Colijnsplaat =

Town in Zeeland, Netherlands

- Village
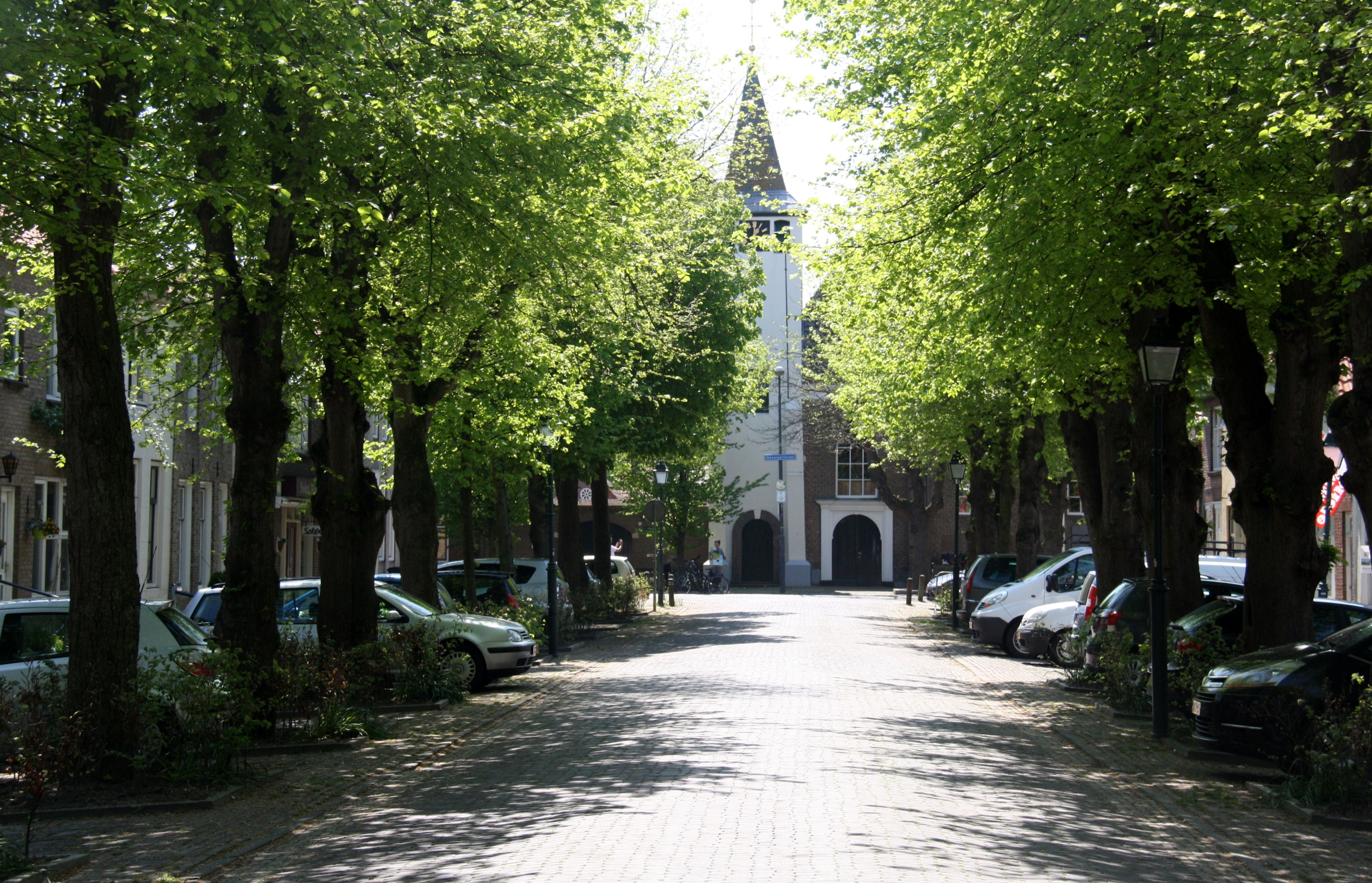
- Street view

- Coat of arms

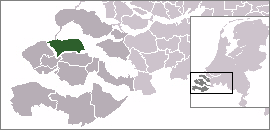

- Location in the province of Zeeland in the Netherlands Colijnsplaat (Netherlands)
- Coordinates: 51°35′55″N 3°50′53″E
- Country: Netherlands
- Province: Zeeland
- Municipality: Noord-Beveland

Area
  - Total: 15.01 km^{2} (5.80 sq mi)
- Elevation: 3.8 m (12 ft)

Population (2021)
  - Total: 1,595
  - Density: 106.3/km^{2} (275.2/sq mi)
- Time zone: UTC+1 (CET)
  - Summer (DST): UTC+2 (CEST)
- Postal code: 4486
- Dialing code: 0113

Colijnsplaat is a village in the Province of Zeeland, the Netherlands It is a part of the Municipality of Noord-Beveland, and lies about 20 km (12 mi) northeast of Middelburg.

== History ==
The village was first mentioned in 1489 as "het gors Colinsplate", and means "sand bank belonging to Colijn". The sand bank was diked in the late 16th century. Colijnsplaats developed after the Oud Noord-Bevelandpolder was created in 1598. The village contains a ring road around the church.

The Dutch Reformed church is a simple aisleless church. The tower was probably built in 1607. It is plastered white and is located on the edge of the church. The church was rebuilt in 1769. In 1856, a consistory was added to church. The former court house was built between 1768 and 1769. From the 19th century until 1941, it was used as town hall.

Colijnsplaats was home to 1,749 people in 1840. On 1 February 1953, a large part of Zeeland was flooded. The water in the harbour which had direct access to sea started to rise, and the inhabitants feared that they were unable to cope, however the ship Lead which was harboured at Colijnsplaats was thrown on the river bank and blocked the coupure preventing a disaster. The event became known as the Miracle of Colijnsplaats.

The harbour was moved inside the dike in 1961 and was filled up in 1979. A new fishing harbour was built to the north for the fleets of Veere and Arnemuiden. The Zeeland Bridge was built between 1961 and 1965 over the Eastern Scheldt. The bridge is over 5 kilometres long and replaced the Zierikzee to Kats ferry.

Colijnsplaats was an independent municipality until 1941 when it was merged into Kortgene. Despite protests, the village was merged into Noord-Beveland in 1995.

== Items of local interest ==
In 2005, a replica was installed here of a temple devoted to the ancient goddess Nehalennia, which remains had been found near the lost town of Ganuenta. She is believed to have been of Germanic or Celtic origin, and there was active worship of her in this area in the 2nd and 3rd centuries AD, based on archeological finds. This replica temple is based on sanctuaries found at Roman provinces of Gaul and Germania. It was constructed, as much as possible, with authentic materials.

== Gallery ==
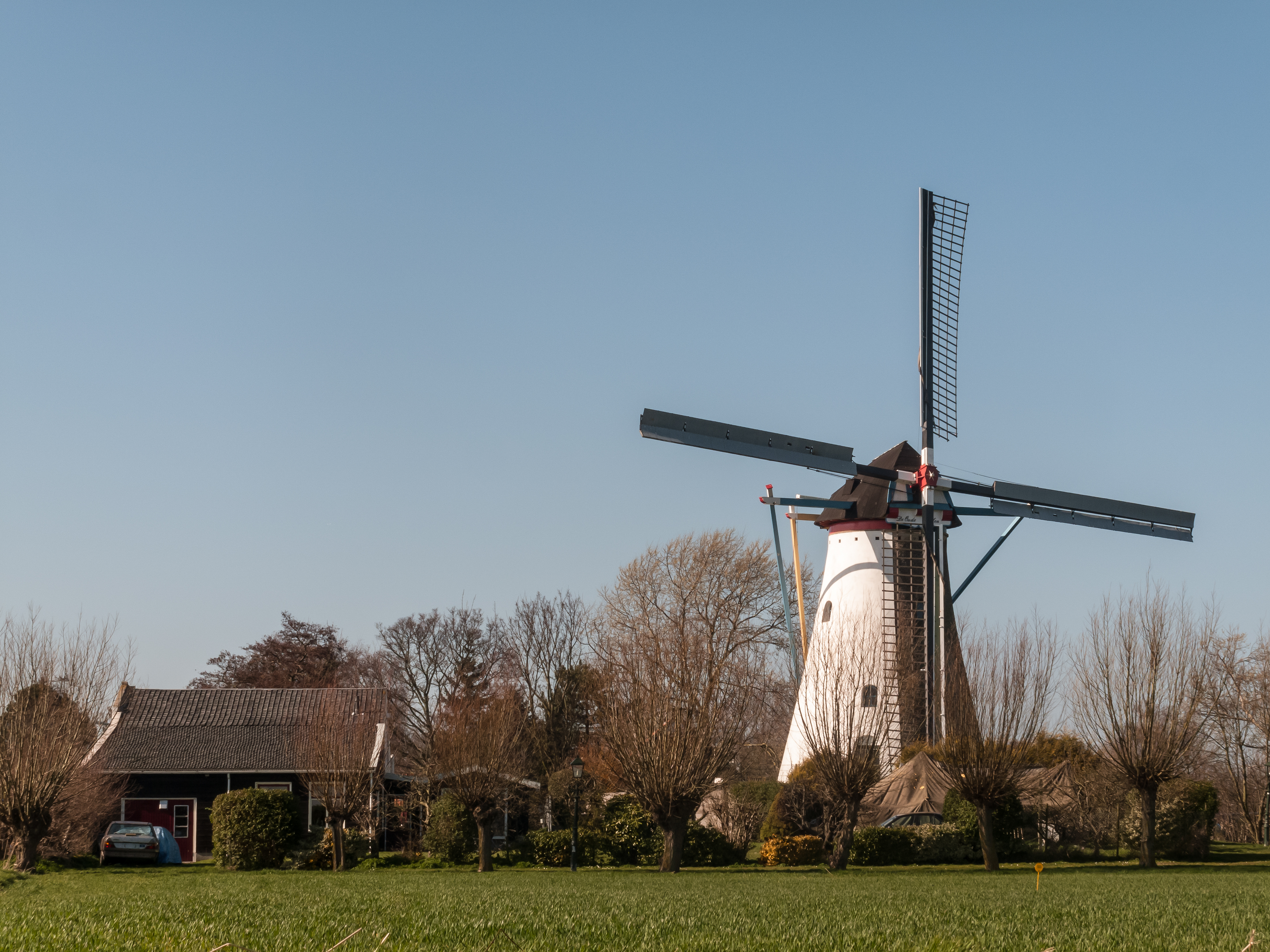
Windmill: de Oude Molen

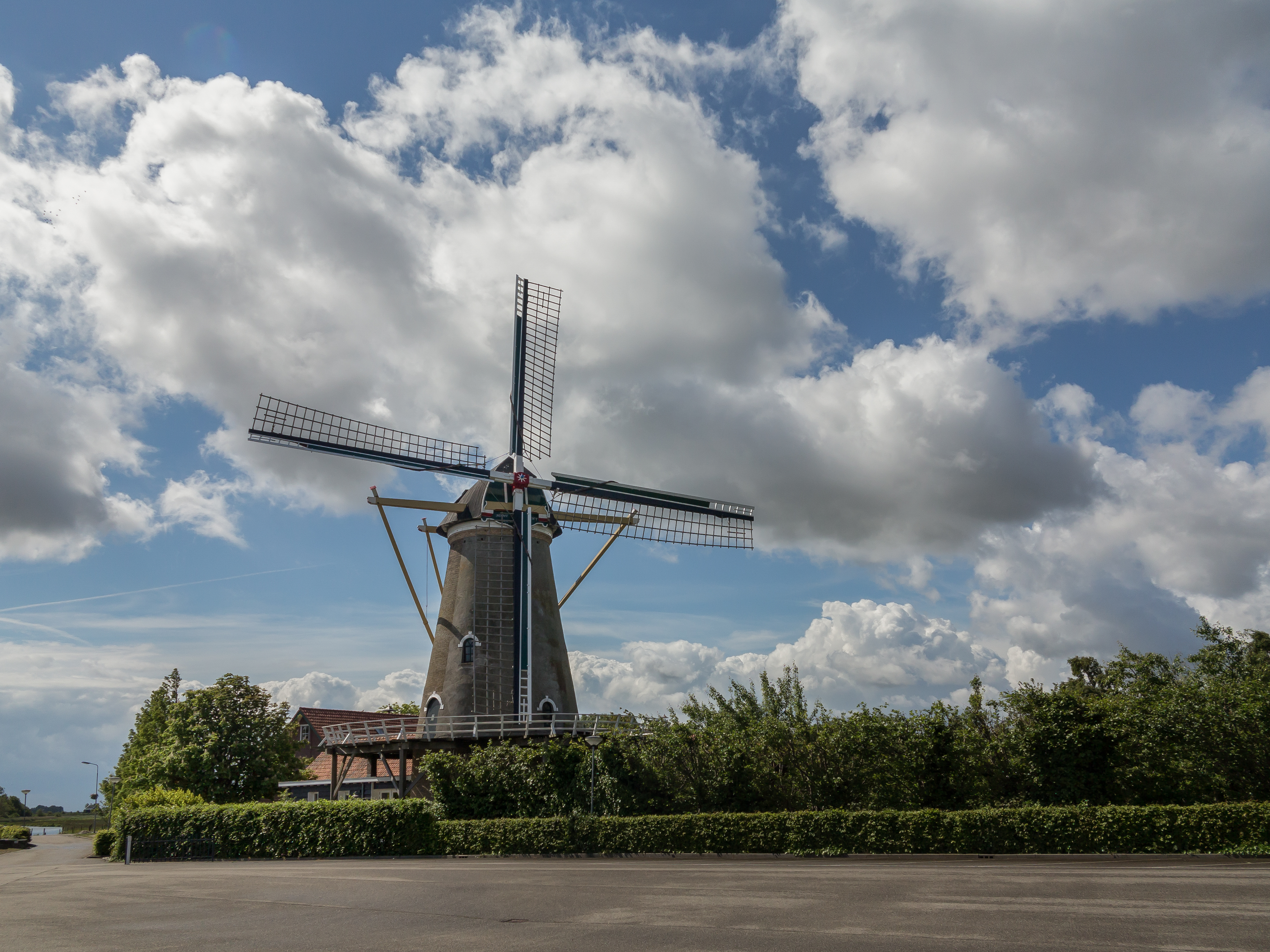
Windmill: korenmolen Nooit Gedacht

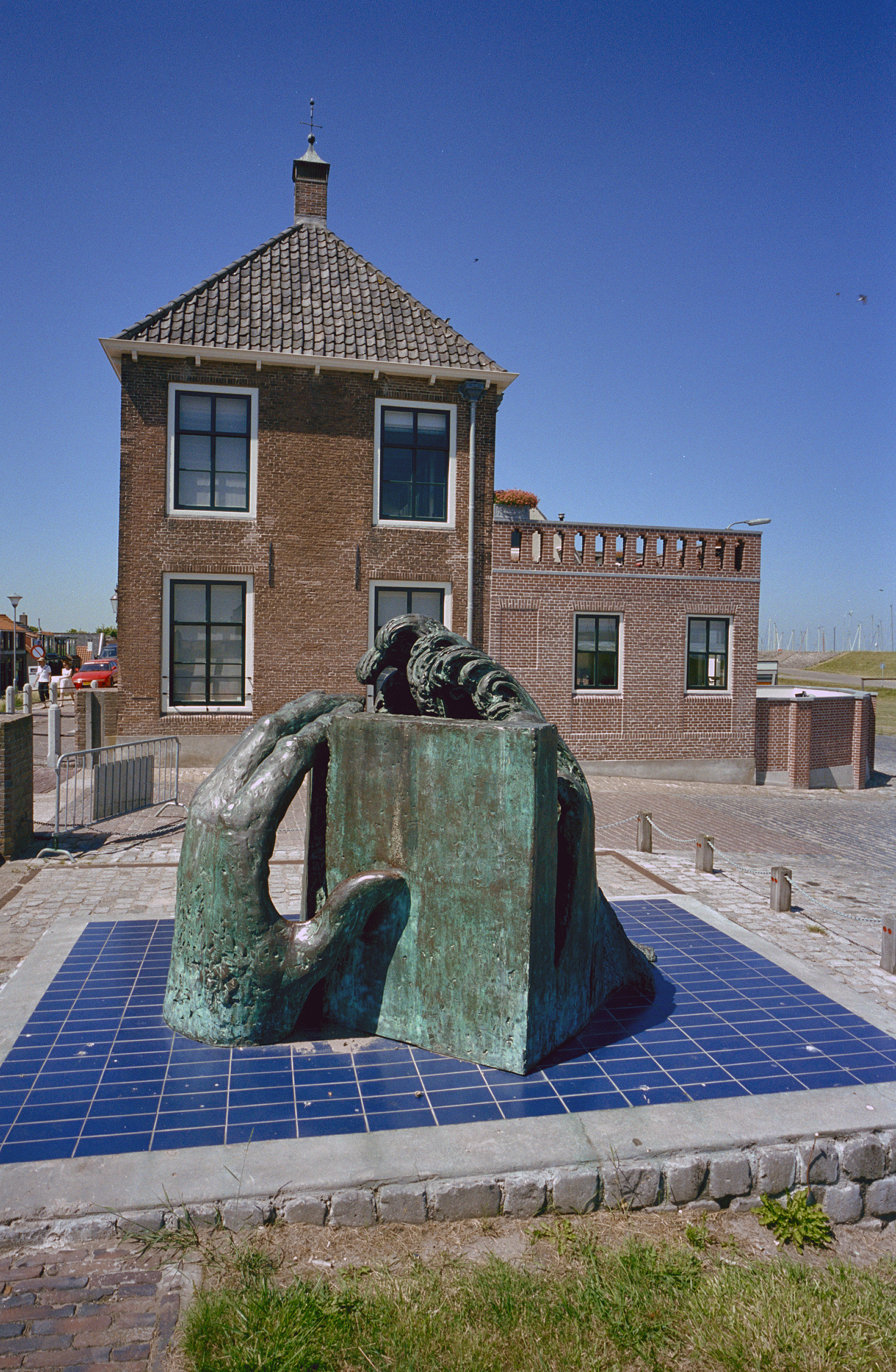
Monument to the North Sea flood of 1953

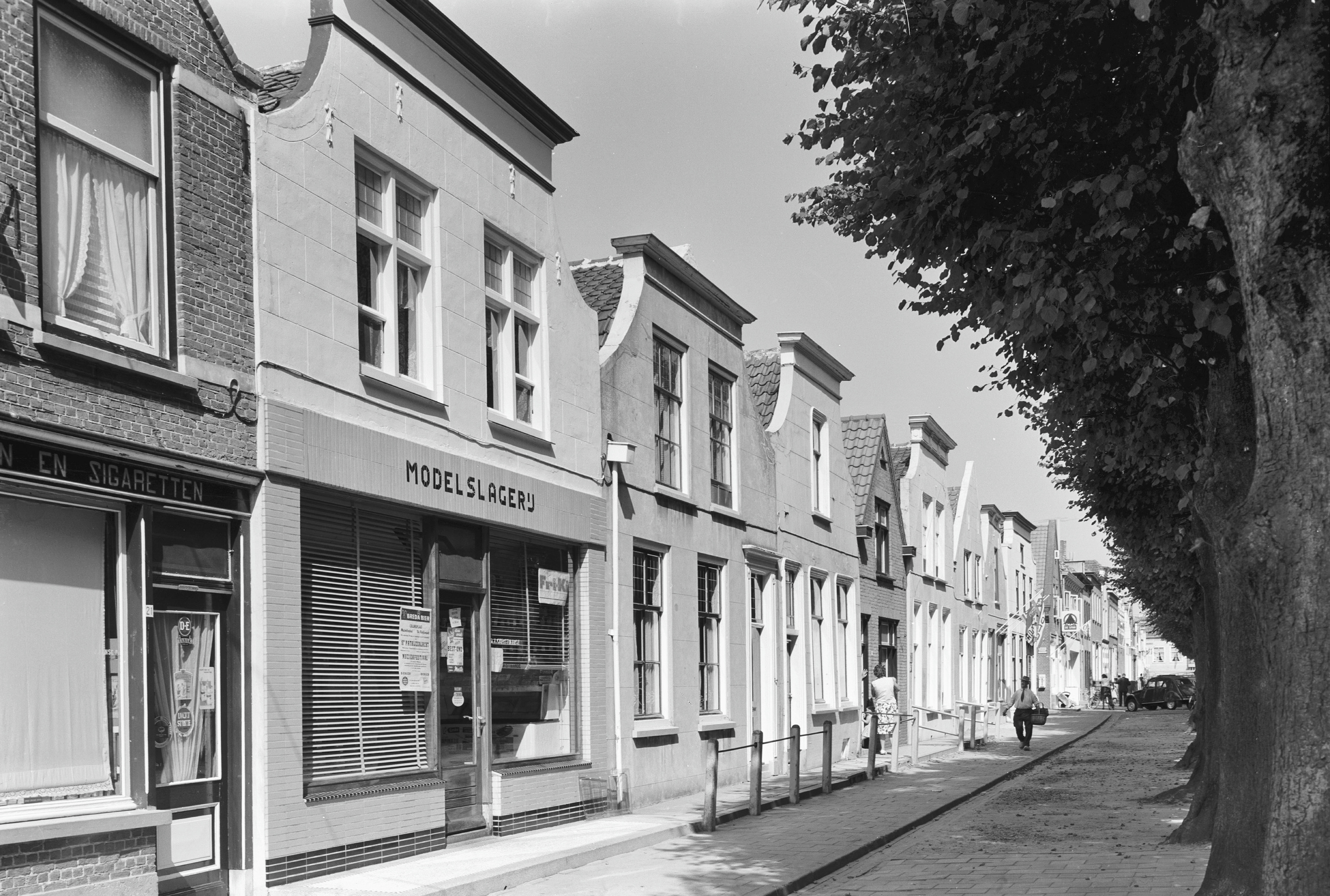
Street view 1964
