= Klaas Bruinsma =

Klaas Bruinsma may refer to:

- Klaas Bruinsma (drug lord) (1953–1991), major Dutch drug lord
- Klaas Bruinsma (translator) (1931–2018), West Frisian language translator
