= Klaas Bruinsma (translator) =

Dutch translator (1931–2018)

Bruinsma (1988)

Klaas Bruinsma (February 1, 1931, in Easterein – October 29, 2018, in Drachten) was a West Frisian language translator of historical works from Dutch, Spanish and Greek, among others.

He translated the works Karel ende Elegast and Beatrijs. In 1993 he was awarded the Obe Postma prize for his translation from Greek of the tragedies of Sophocles. In 2005 he obtained this prize for the second time for his translation of Virgil's Georgics and especially for his translations of the Iliad and the Odyssey of Homer.

Until his retirement, Bruinsma was a lecturer of English and history at the Ichthus College in Drachten, amongst others.
