= Papeloze Kerk =

Restored megalithic tomb in Netherlands

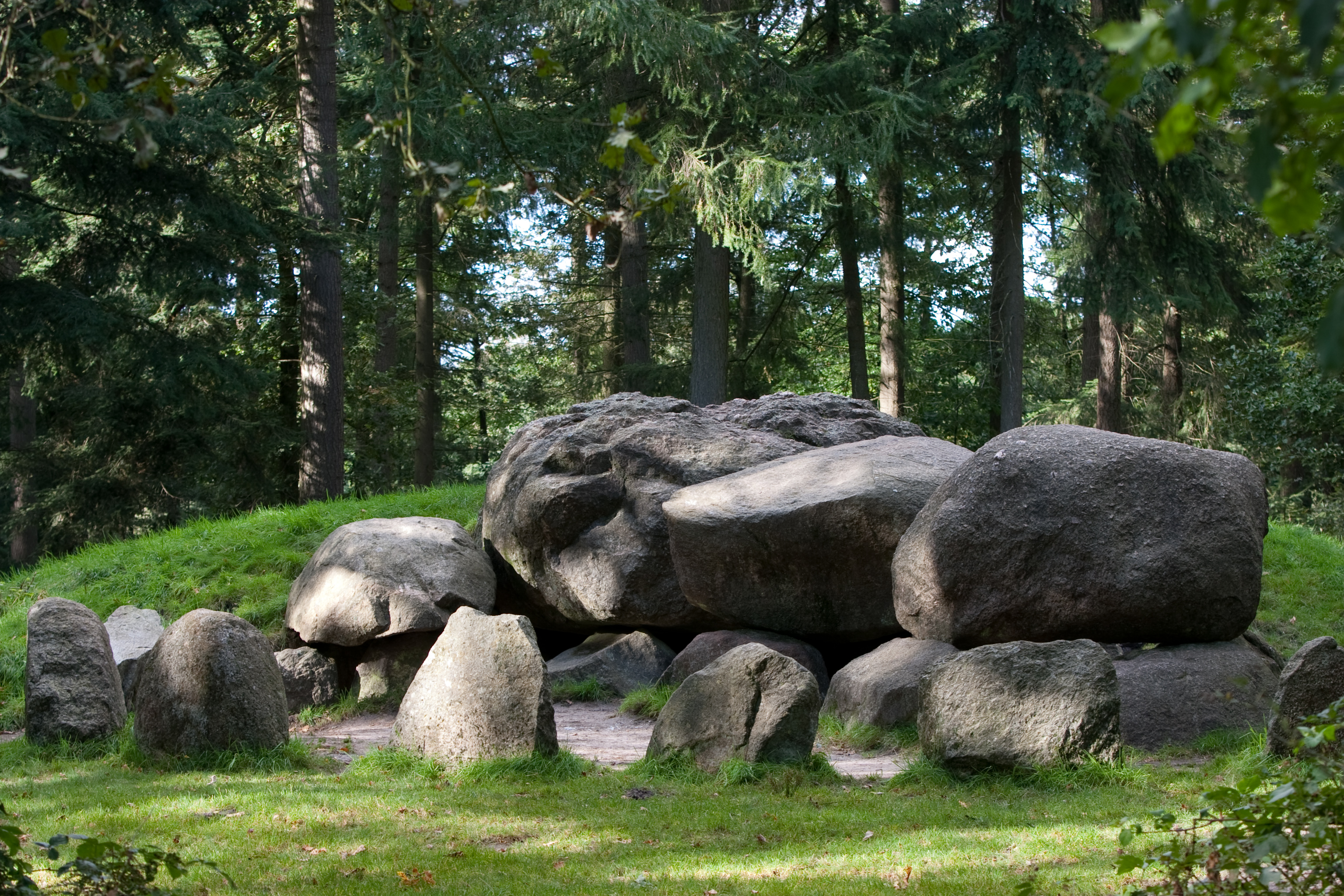
- Papeloze Kerk

- Location within Netherlands
- 52.8201°N 6.7738°E
- Type: Dolmen
- Periods: Neolithic
- Location: Schoonoord, Coevorden
- Region: Netherlands

Papeloze Kerk (catalogued as D49) is a restored megalithic tomb (Dutch: hunebed) near Schoonoord in the Netherlands.

== Name ==
The meaning of the name is disputed but it is generally thought to mean "priestless church" (Dutch: paap = priest) or "popeless church". It is sometimes said that anti-Catholic (anti-"popish") sermons were held here in the 16th century.

== Restoration ==
The monument was heavily damaged in the 1860s by people using it as a quarry for building material. It was excavated in 1938 and again in 1958 by A. E. van Giffen. In 1959 he chose to restore it as a demonstration model of a Dutch "hunebed" tomb. Some of the stones were taken from elsewhere, including eleven stones taken from another hunebed (D33). Half the tomb was covered in earth and the chamber was reconstructed with dry-stone walling. The other half of the tomb was left in skeleton form.
