= Ellert and Brammert =

Dutch mythical characters

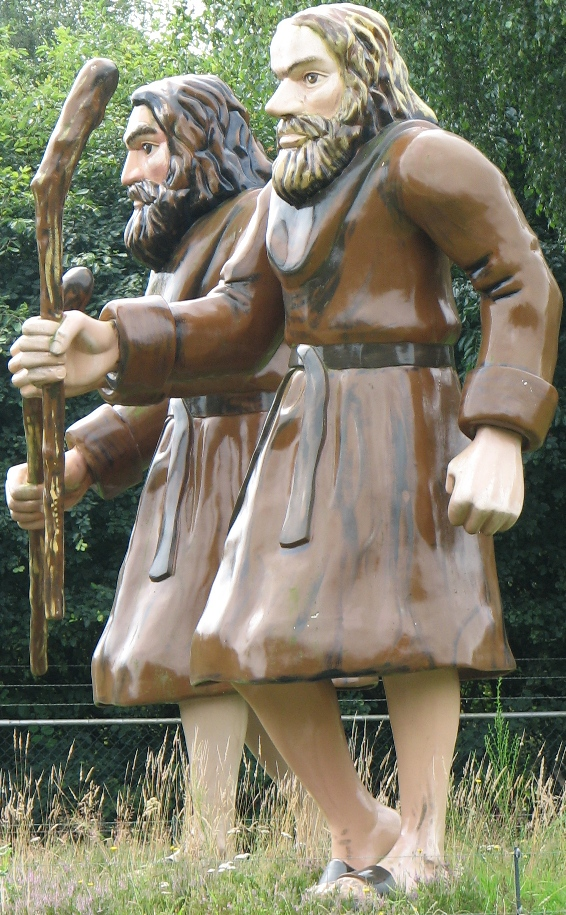
Ellert and Brammert

Ellert and Brammert are legendary giants from Dutch folklore who supposedly robbed travellers in Drenthe, Netherlands.

The Ellert en Brammert museum is named after them.
