= Bernhard van Haersma Buma =

Dutch writer and politician (1932–2020)

- Born: Bernhardus van Haersma Buma; 23 March 1932; Stavoren, Friesland, Netherlands
- Died: 26 June 2020 (aged 88); Leeuwarden, Netherlands
- Occupations: politician, mayor and writer

Bernhardus "Bernhard" van Haersma Buma (23 March 1932 – 26 June 2020) was a Dutch politician and writer. As politician he was part of Christelijk-Historische Unie (CHU) and later CDA. He was mayor of Workum and Sneek.

== Biography ==
Van Haersma Buma was born in Stavoren in the province Friesland. He was the son of S. M. van Haersma Buma, who was the mayor there since 1930. When he was six years old his father became mayor of Wymbritseradeel. He was arrested during World War II and died in camp Neuengamme in 1942. Buma came from a family of grietmannen (rural mayors).

After finishing gymnasium in Sneek in 1950, he started studying law at Rijksuniversiteit Utrecht. After graduating he started his career working for the cabinet of the mayor of Den Haag and in 1959 for the cabinet of the commissaris van de Koningin in Drenthe. Besides that he was active as a politician. In 1960 he was appointed as chairman of Federatie van Christelijk-Historische Jongerengroepen.

In June 1962, when Van Haersma Buma was 30 years old, he was appointed as mayor of Workum. Exactly eight years later he became mayor of Sneek. He was the mayor until he retired in 1993. During his time as mayor, but also later he wrote several books about the history of Friesland.

He married Elly van Werkum (1933–2019) in 1959. They had two daughters and a son, Sybrand van Haersma Buma, who became member of the House of Representatives from 2002, served as the parliamentary leader of the Christian Democratic Appeal (CDA) from 2010 and leader of his party from 2012 and mayor of Leeuwarden since 2019.

On 26 June 2020, while swimming he became unwell. Bystanders were alarmed, and resuscitated him. An ambulance was called, and Buma was hospitalised in Leeuwarden where he died aged 88.

== Bibliography ==
Books as (co) author

- Van wezenzorg naar stadsbelang: het Old Burger Weeshuis te Sneek 1581–1981, Osinga, Bolsward, 1981, ISBN 90-6066-386-1
- Rapport van de commissie Naar een nieuw Fries Museum beleid, Fries Museum, Leeuwarden, 1985
- Gotisch bouwen in Friesland, Stichting Monument van de Maand, Leeuwarden, 1991, ISBN 90-73845-03-3
- Spoorzoeken naar Gods erf: middeleeuwse Friese kloosters, Stichting Kultuer en Toerisme yn Fryslân, Leeuwarden, 1994, ISBN 90-73845-23-8
- Dominicusdag 1245–1995: 750 jaar Dominicaanse aanwezigheid in Leeuwarden, Comité Dominicusdag 1245–1995, Leeuwarden, 1999, ISBN 90-9009379-6
- Het Boshuisen Gasthuis te Leeuwarden: gestalten en geslachten rond een gasthuis uit 1652, Stichting Boshuisen Gasthuis, Leeuwarden, 1999, ISBN 90-9012705-4
- 1969–1999, Zuidwest Friesland, Zuidwest Friesland, Sneek, 1999, ISBN 90-9012832-8
- De Grote of Jacobijnerkerk en de Friese Nassaus, Friese Pers Boekerij, Leeuwarden, 2005, ISBN 90-330-0521-2
- De Grote of Jacobijnerkerk te Leeuwarden, Friese Pers Boekerij, Leeuwarden, 2008, ISBN 978-90-330-0648-7
