= Schoonoord, Coevorden =

Schoonoord
- Village
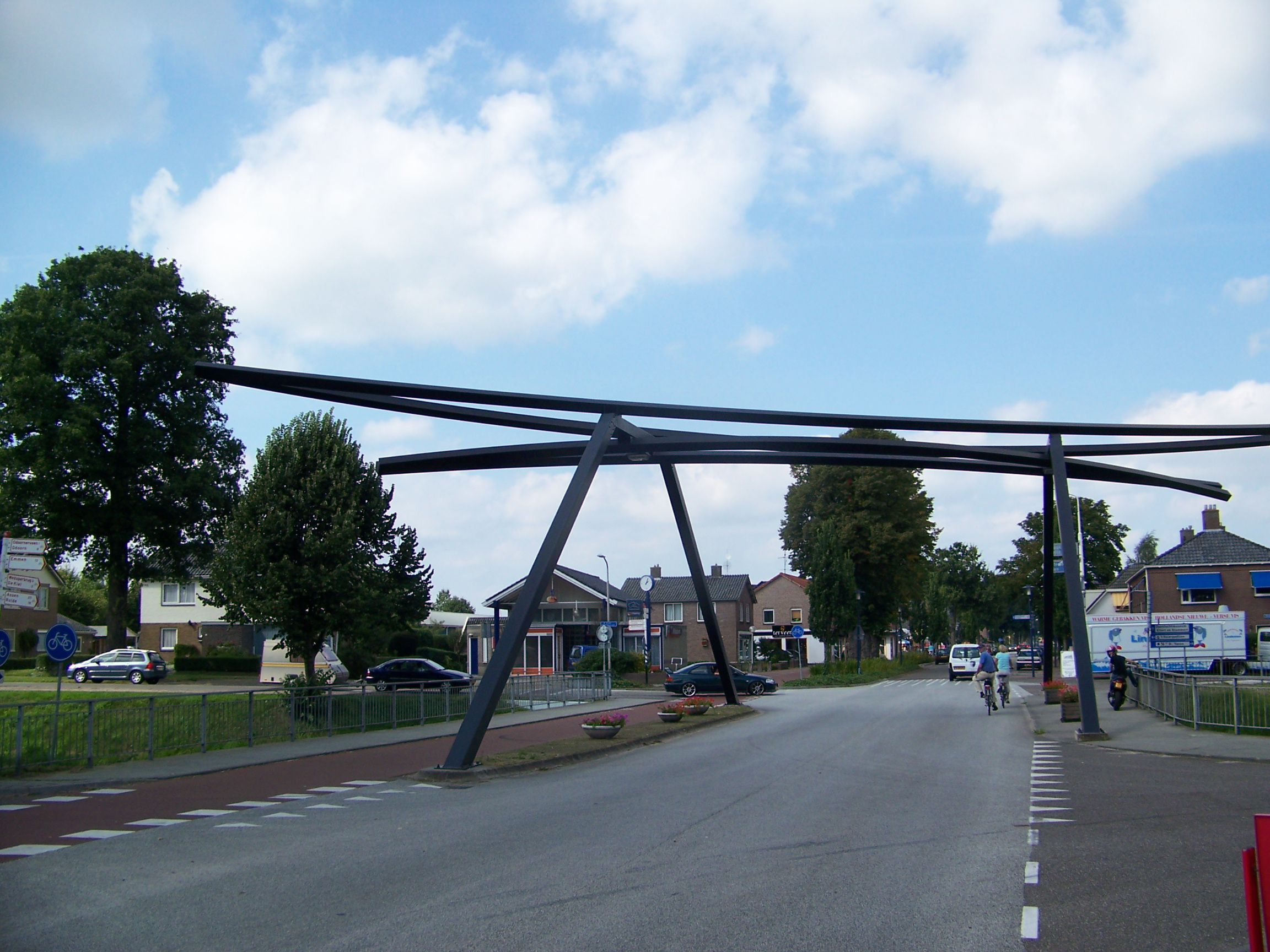
- A bridge in the centre of the village

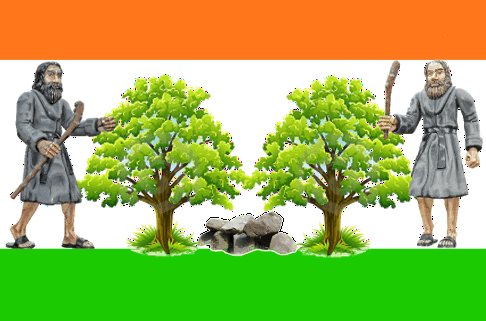
- Flag

- Location of the village in the province of Drenthe Schoonoord (Netherlands)
- Coordinates: 52°50′46″N 6°45′22″E
- Country: Netherlands
- Province: Drenthe
- Municipality: Coevorden

Area
  - Total: 12.03 km^{2} (4.64 sq mi)
- Elevation: 19 m (62 ft)

Population (2021)
  - Total: 2,130
  - Density: 177/km^{2} (459/sq mi)
- Time zone: UTC+1 (CET)
  - Summer (DST): UTC+2 (CEST)
- Postal code: 7848
- Dialing code: 0591

Schoonoord is a village in the Netherlands and it is part of the Coevorden municipality in Drenthe. It has an altitude of about 20 meters (65 feet). The population was 2,219 with 970 households in 2004.

== History ==
Schoonoord was founded in 1854 by labourmen from Smilde who dug the Oranjekanaal. Later, when the peat in the neighbouring Odoornerveen was being cut, more workers settled in the village. The name of the village was thought up by the peat digger Klijn. It literally means "beautiful place".

== Places of interest ==
Due to the 100th anniversary of the village a few turf huts were built. This collection has evolved to the open-air museum Ellert en Brammert. Also, there is a megalith called the Papeloze Kerk nearby Schoonoord. A windmill in Schoonoord has been converted to residential accommodation but is missing its cap and sails.
