= Ellert en Brammert (museum) =

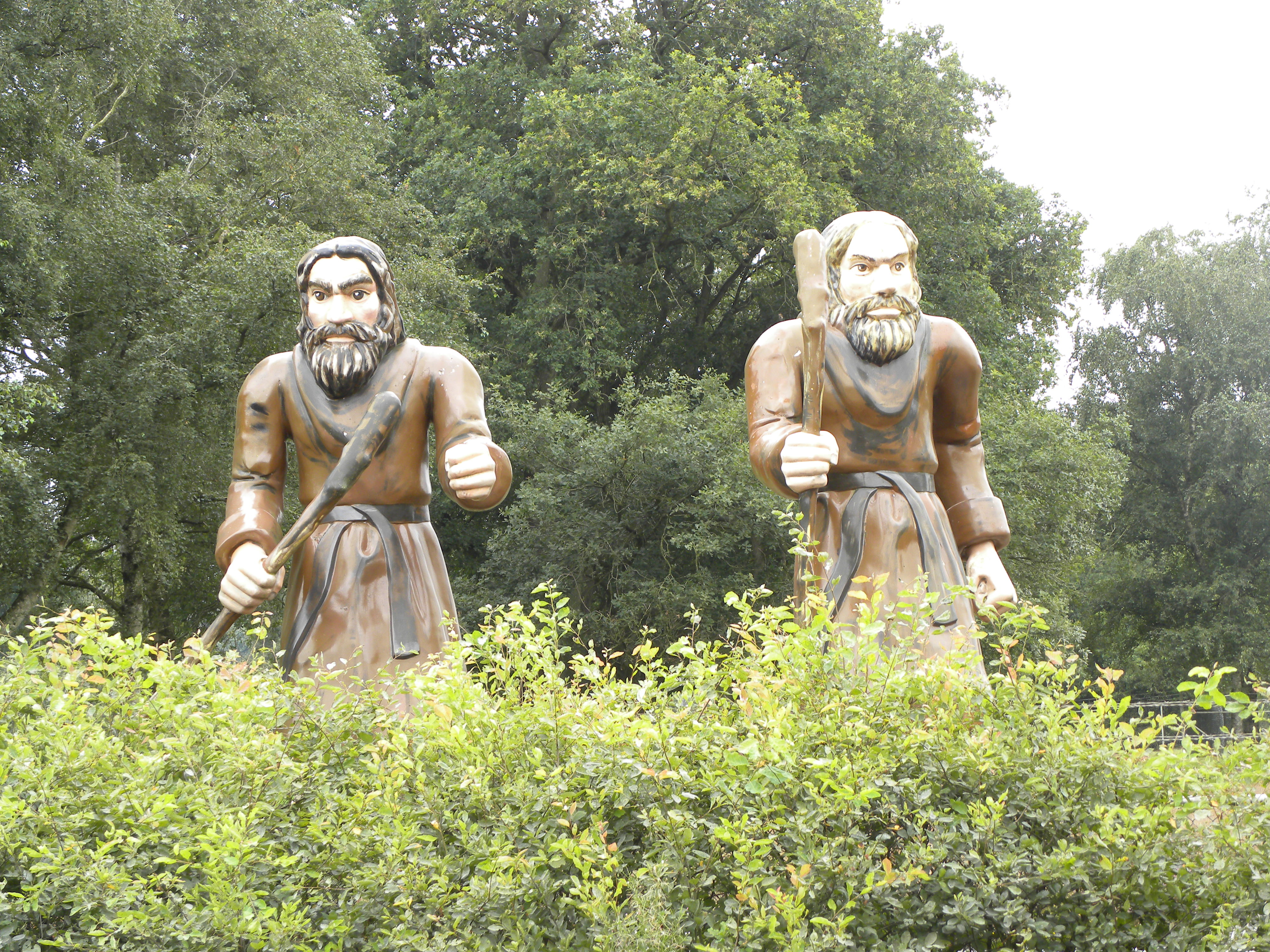
- Statues of the mythical giants Ellert and Brammert at the museum

- Location in the province of Drenthe
- Location: Schoonoord, Netherlands
- Coordinates: 52°51′9″N 6°45′2″E
- Type: Open-air museum
- Website: www.ellertenbrammert.nl

Ellert en Brammert is an open-air museum in Schoonoord expositing the way people lived in Drenthe at the time of the peat digging. It was named after a myth about the two giants Ellert and Brammert who prowled around the Ellertsveld.

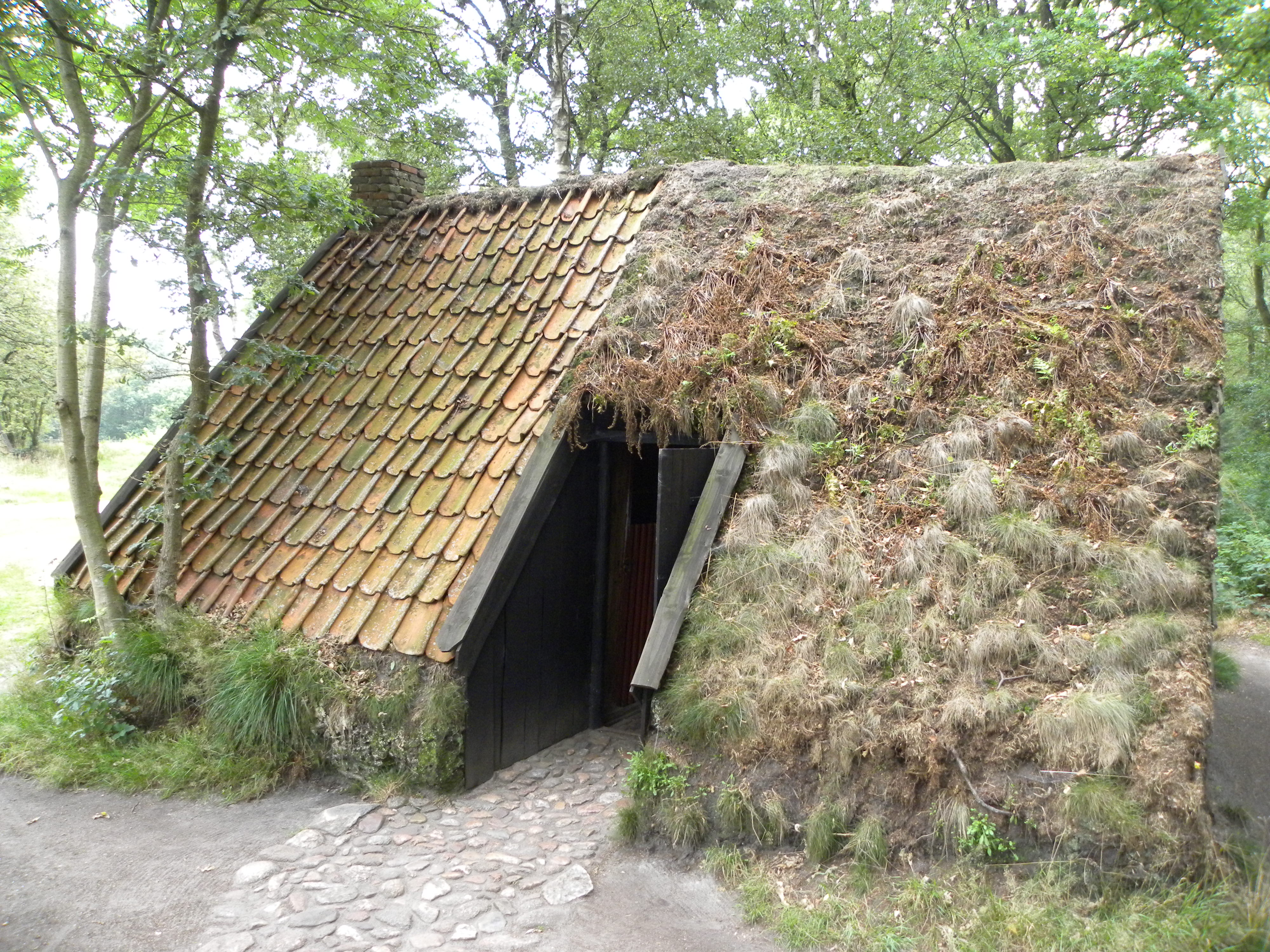
House

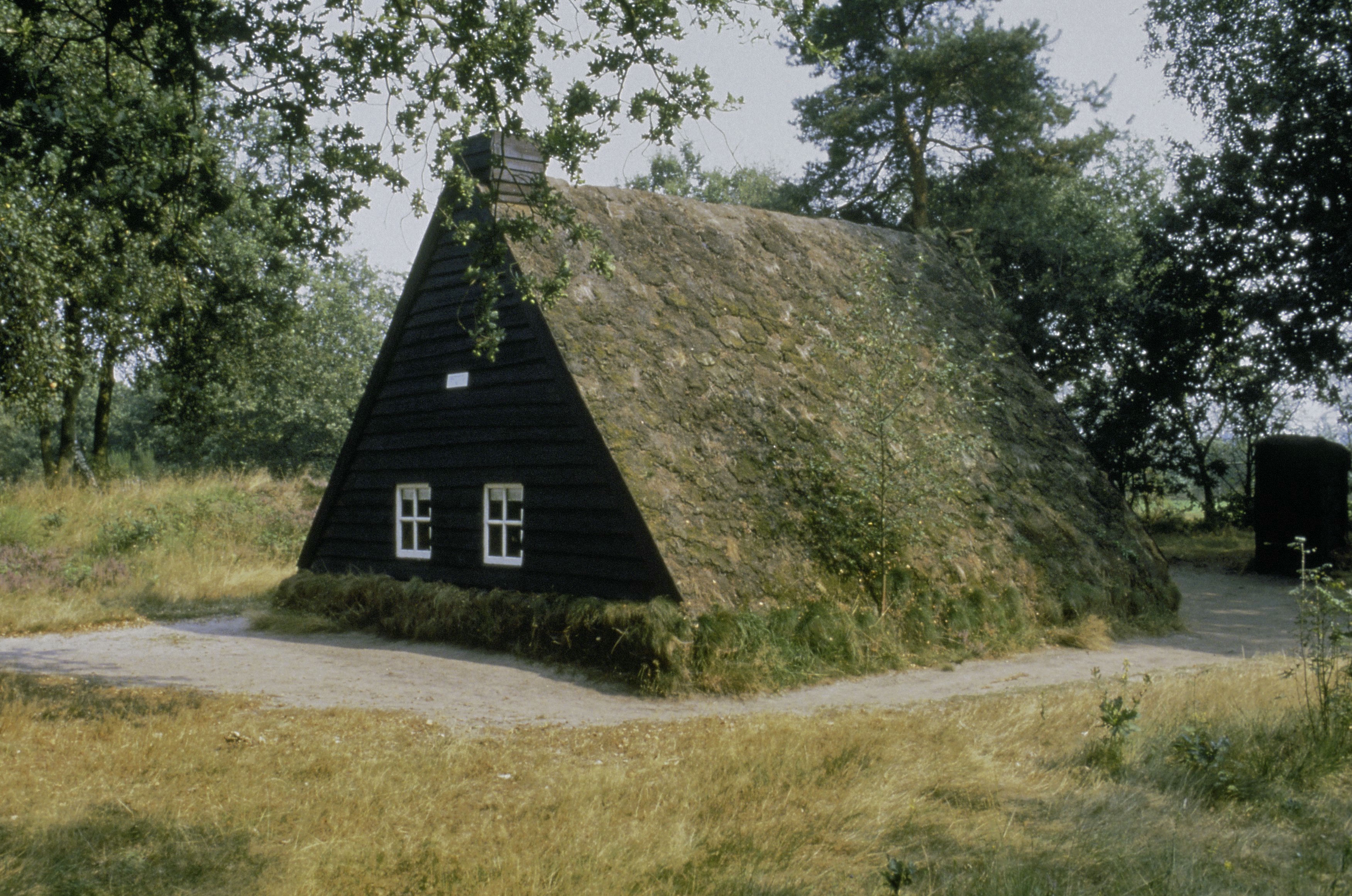
House

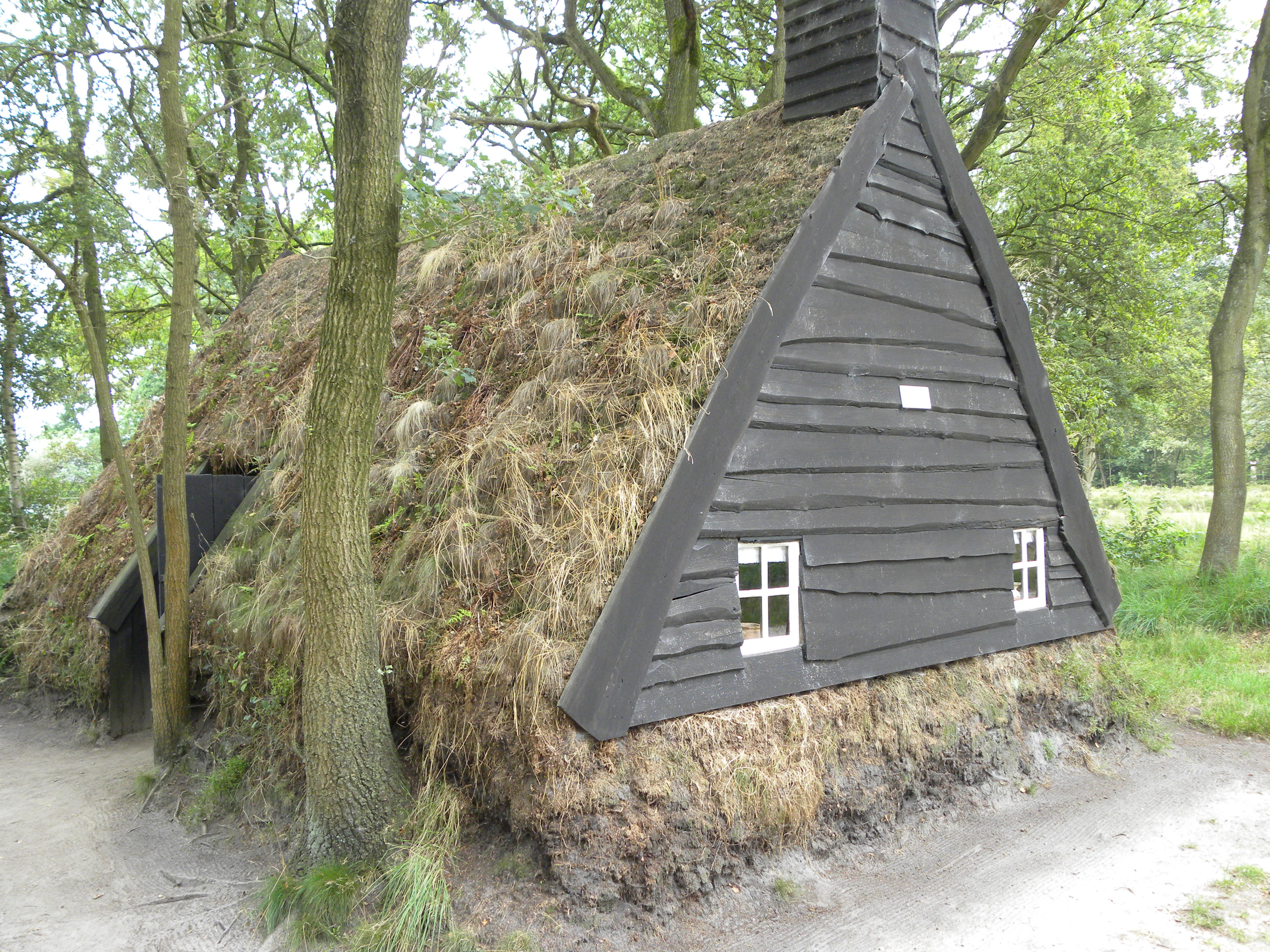
House

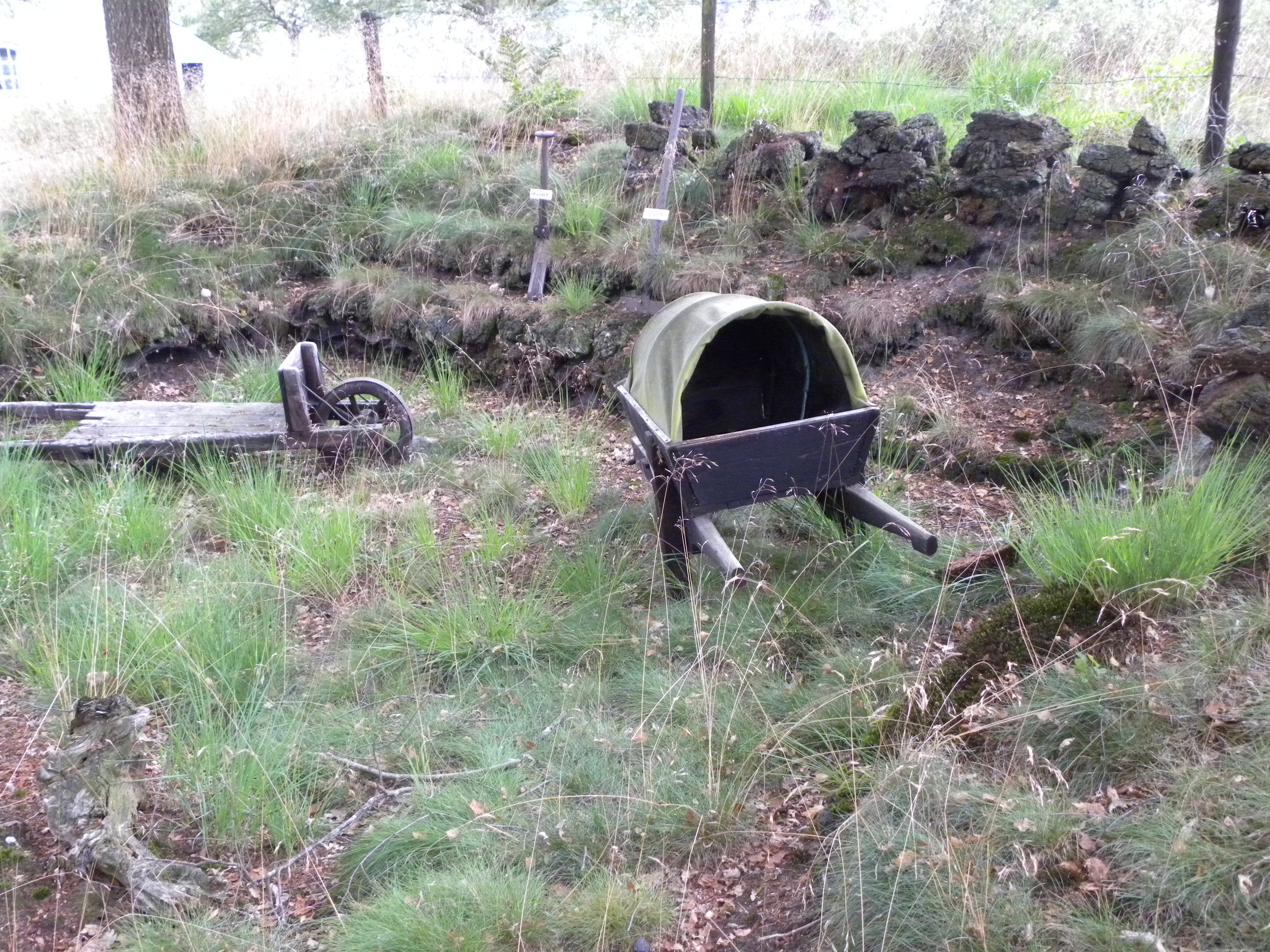
Peat digging

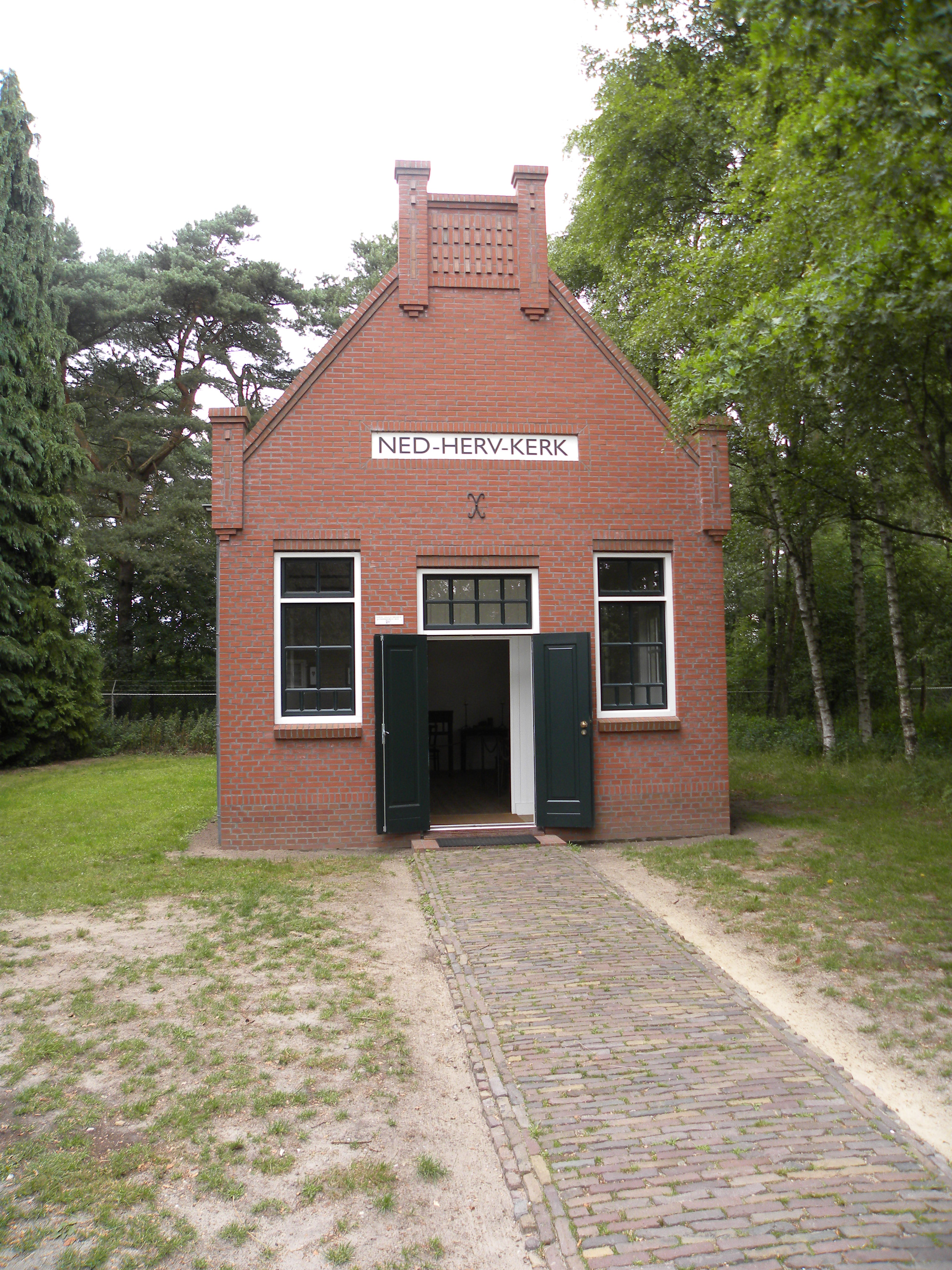
Protestant church

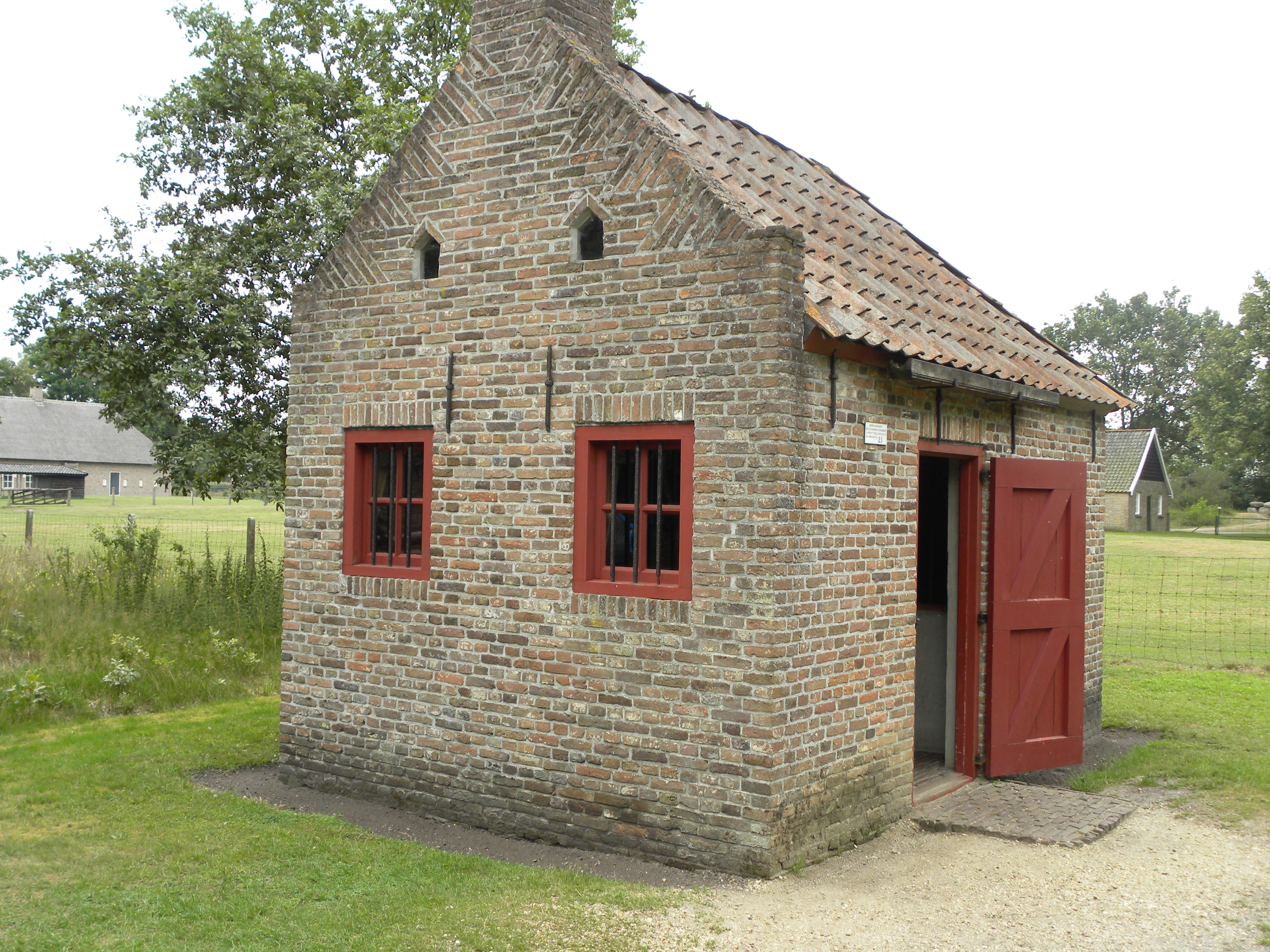
Village prison

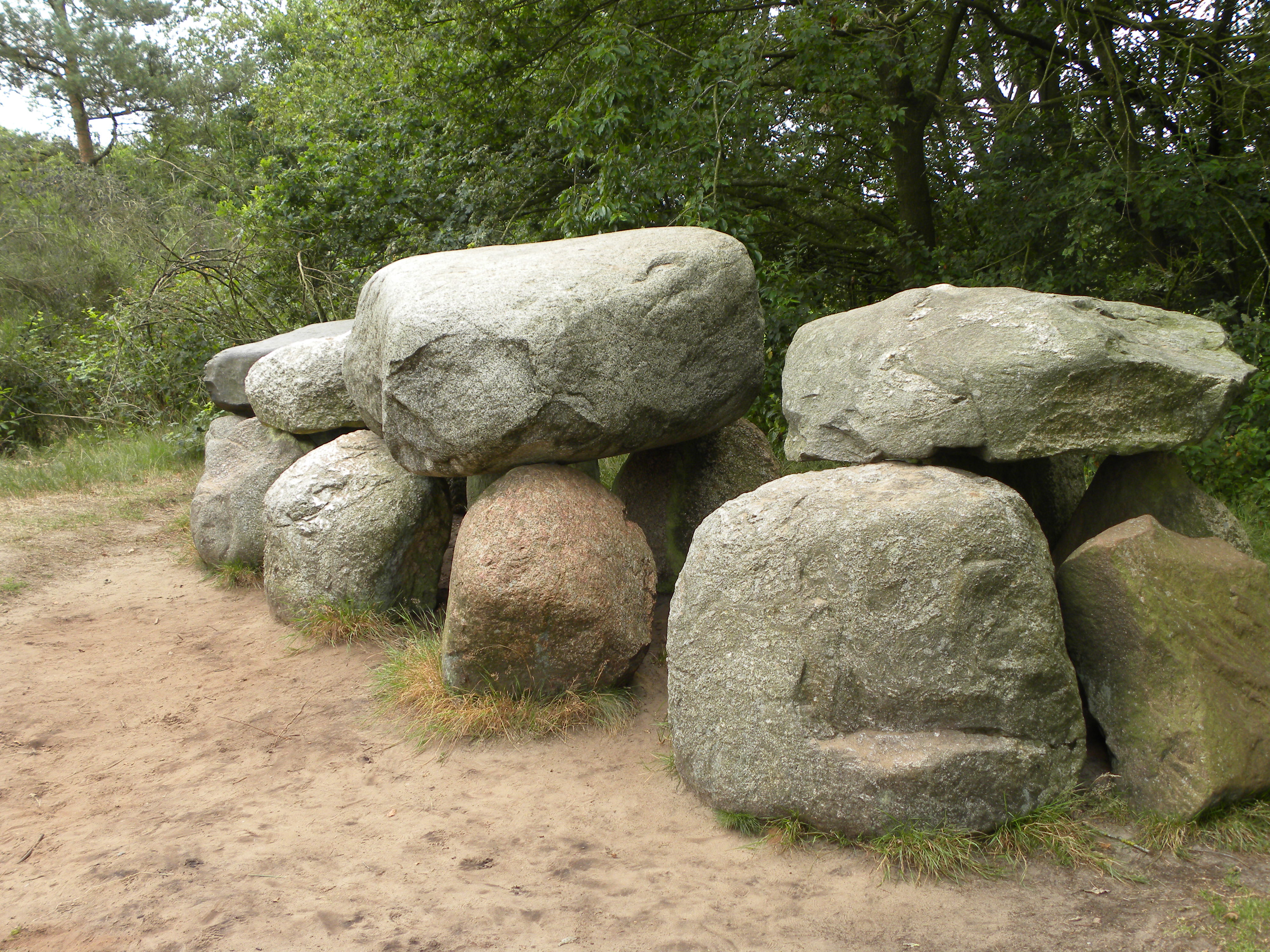
Hunebed

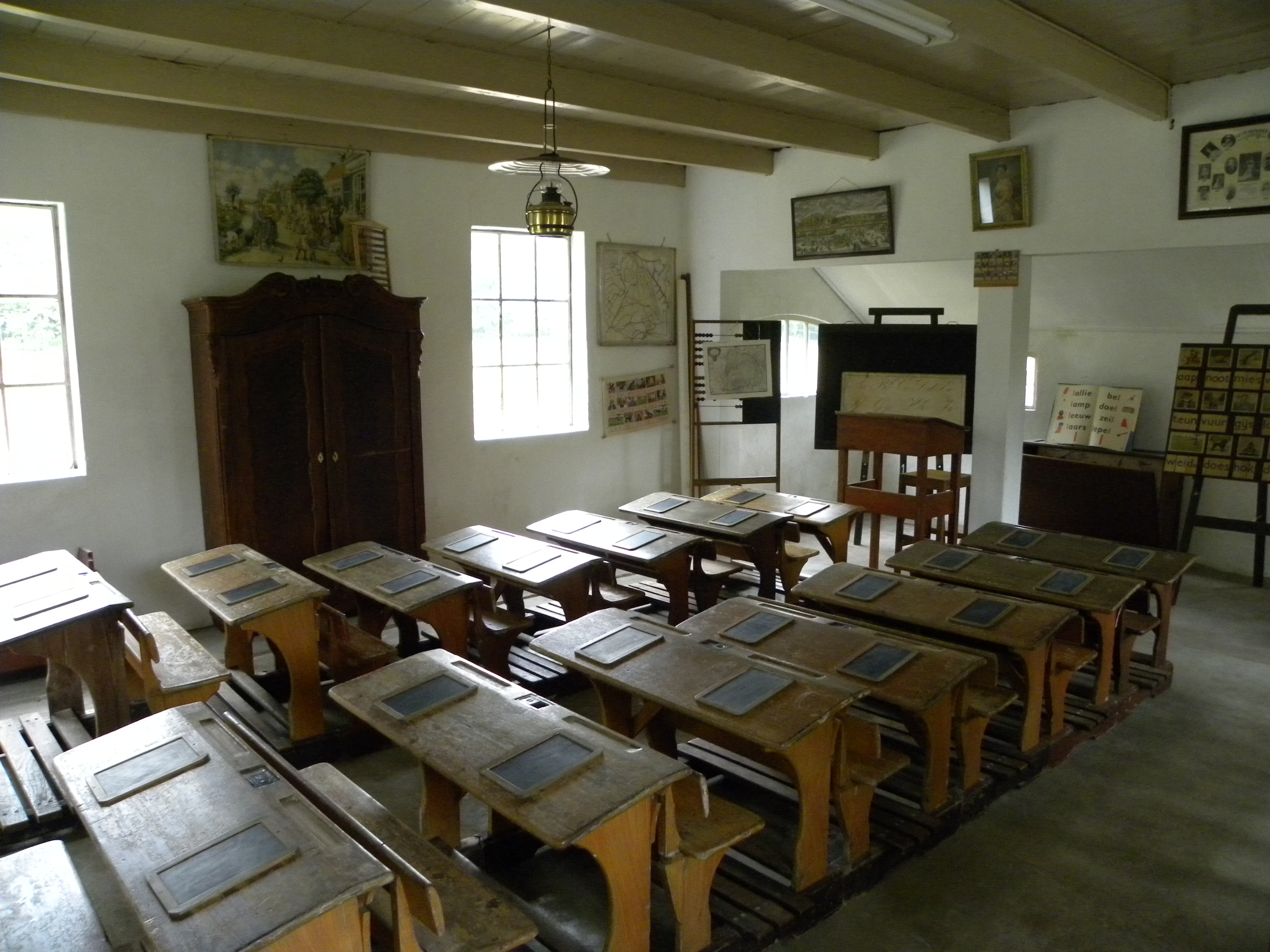
School interior
