= Lady of Stavoren =

Dutch folk tale

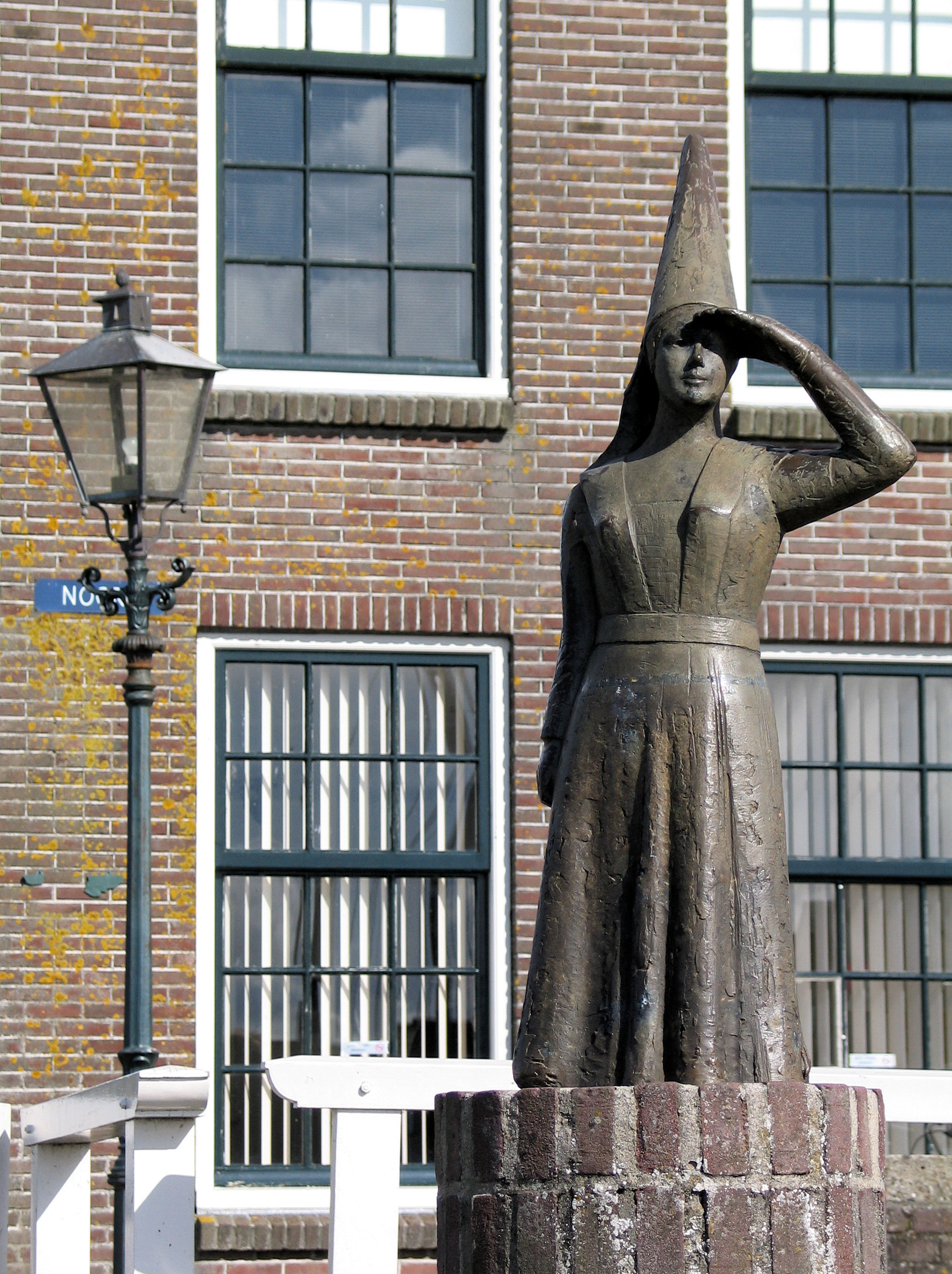
The statue of the Lady of Stavoren in the town square

The Lady of Stavoren (Dutch: Vrouwtje van Stavoren, West Frisian: Frouke fan Starum) is a folk tale from the Netherlands which originated in the 16th century.

== The legend ==
Now a village of just 1,000 inhabitants, Stavoren was once a wealthy port city in the Dutch province of Friesland but began to decline in the late Middle Ages after a sandbank formed outside the harbour, blocking ships from entering and exiting. Several stories have been told over the years to explain the forming of the sandbank, including the tale of the Lady of Stavoren.

The story, of which more than 27 versions are known, involves an exceedingly rich patrician merchant widow, who desired ever greater riches. She sent a captain of her merchant fleet out in search of the greatest treasure in the world. When he returned with wheat, declaring wheat to be "the most precious thing in the world," as it can feed the hungry, the widow, in her overweening pride and anger at his (as she perceived it) foolishness, let the wheat be thrown overboard into the harbour of Stavoren.

When she was cautioned against this wicked behaviour, being reminded of the fickleness of fate and (despite her wealth and power) of the delicateness of her station, in hubris she took a ring from her finger and cast it into the ocean, declaring that she was as likely to fall into poverty as she was of regaining the ring.

Soon afterwards, during a banquet thrown for her fellow Hanseatic merchant princes, she finds the ring inside a large fish served to her. As this event portended, she lost her wealth, living out her remaining years in destitution, begging for scraps of bread. In divine retribution the port had silted, and the wheat that had been cast overboard now grew in the resulting sandbank that closed the harbour and ruined the city.

The tale shares its basic motif with the story of the Ring of Polycrates found in Herodotus. Its Aarne-Thompson index number is 736A. The Lady made her first entrance in the Friesland Chronicle of Ocko Scarlensis (1597) and the story was gradually elaborated thereafter. The sandbar on which only empty ears of wheat will grow was added in the eighteenth century, while the motif of the discarded ring appears for the first time around 1810.

The tale has inspired songs, plays, operas and films. A statue of the fabled Lady gazing out to sea was erected in front of Stavoren harbour in 1969.
