= Saeftinghe legend =

Old Dutch Folk Tale

The Saeftinghe Legend is an old Dutch folk tale that explains the sunken city of Saeftinghe in eastern Zeelandic Flanders near Nieuw-Namen, The Netherlands, that existed until it was entirely flooded by sea waters in 1584. The legends says the city grew to be the most prosperous city on the fertile lands of the Scheldts but the inhabitants grew vain and proud. The farmers dressed in silk, their horses wearing silver and even the thresholds of homes were made from gold. The wealth attracted poor immigrants but the people of Saeftinghe showed no mercy and chased the migrants away with sticks and dogs. Greed corrupted the hearts of men and turned them blind for imminent threats.

On a foggy day, a fisherman caught a mermaid on the waters of the Western Scheldt. From the nets, the mermaid warned him Saeftinghe needed to change its ways or suffer the inevitable dire consequences. When the mermaid's husband surfaced and asked for his wife to be set free, the fisherman refused and yelled at him. The merman cursed the fisherman and his city, screaming "The lands of Saeftinghe will fall, only its towers will continue to stand tall!"

The people of Saeftinghe, occupied with greed, forgot to take care of their dikes. One day, when a maid went to get water from a well, she noticed cod and other fish swimming in it. The sea was nearing, the water turning salt. With the All Saints' flood of 1570, a huge tidal wave washed over the lands of Saeftinghe, destroying the towns of Sint-Laureins, Namen and Casuwele, killing all inhabitants.

Saeftinghe withered and soon only its towers testified of its prosperous past until the city finally sank into the muddy swamps.

On foggy days, the tower bells call for help from what was once a wealthy place but is now a doomed world covered in mud, captured by the sea. Another Saeftinghe legend holds the belief that visitors of the area and inhabitants of the nearby village of Emmadorp sometimes see 'ghosts' in the fog. According to the legend the ghosts are the spirits of the inhabitants of the three towns killed in the flood.

== See also ==
- Lost city
