= Beatrijs =

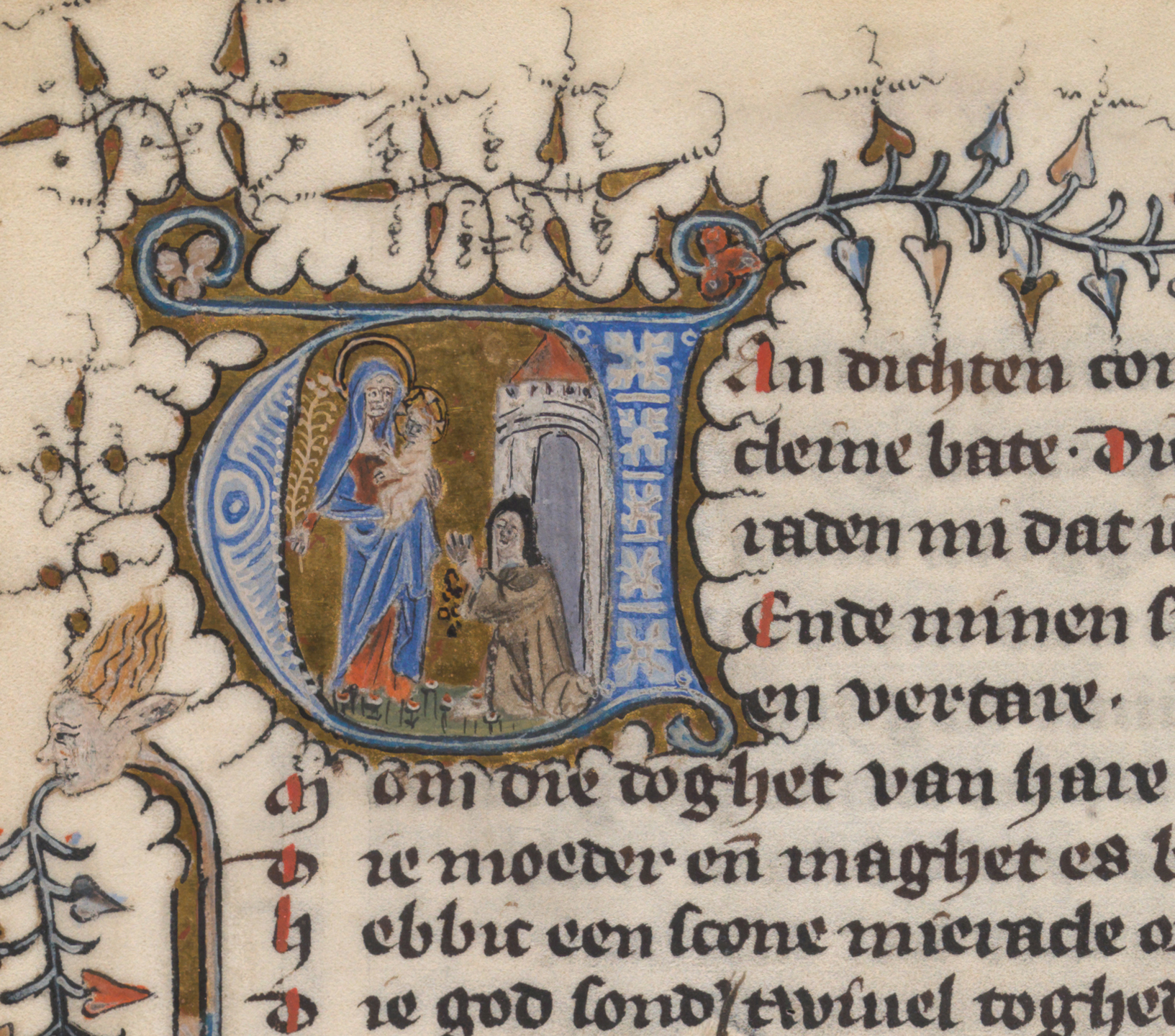
Illuminated initial at the beginning of the Beatrijs legend. The Hague, Royal Library, 76 E 5

Beatrijs (English: Beatrice) is a poem written in the last quarter of the 14th century (ca.1374), possibly by Diederic van Assenede, and is an original Dutch poem about the legend of a nun, Beatrijs, who deserted her convent for the love of a man, lives with him for seven years and has two children. When he runs out of money, he leaves her. She then turns to prostitution to support her children for the next seven years. One day, she is near her old convent, so she inquires discreetly what has become of the nun Beatrijs and learns that people think Beatrijs is still at the convent. One night, a voice urges her to return to the convent, and when she returns, Beatrijs learns that Mary (mother of Jesus) has been acting in her role at the convent, and she can return without anyone knowing of her absence.

The Dutch poem was created out of a legend recorded in Latin, Dialogus Miraculorum (1219–1223) and Libri Octo Miraculorum (1225–1227) written by Caesarius von Heisterbach. Although Hilka claims that Caesarius von Heisterbach was not the actual author of the latter text, as Duinhoven points out, he was undoubtedly the author of record during the Middle Ages. The subject matter is possibly of Dutch origin during his travels in the Netherlands. However, the Dutch version was not a word-for-word translation. The tale is translated into English, Esperanto, Frisian, French, German, Spanish, Old Norse and Arabic.

== Adaptations ==
In the 20th century, several modern adaptations have been produced:

- Poem: Beatrijs by Dutch poet P.C. Boutens
- Play: Ik dien (Dutch for I serve) by Herman Teirlinck
- Opera libretto: Beatrijs by Felix Rutten

== See also ==
- Dutch folklore
