= Stavoren =

Stavoren West Frisian: Starum
- City
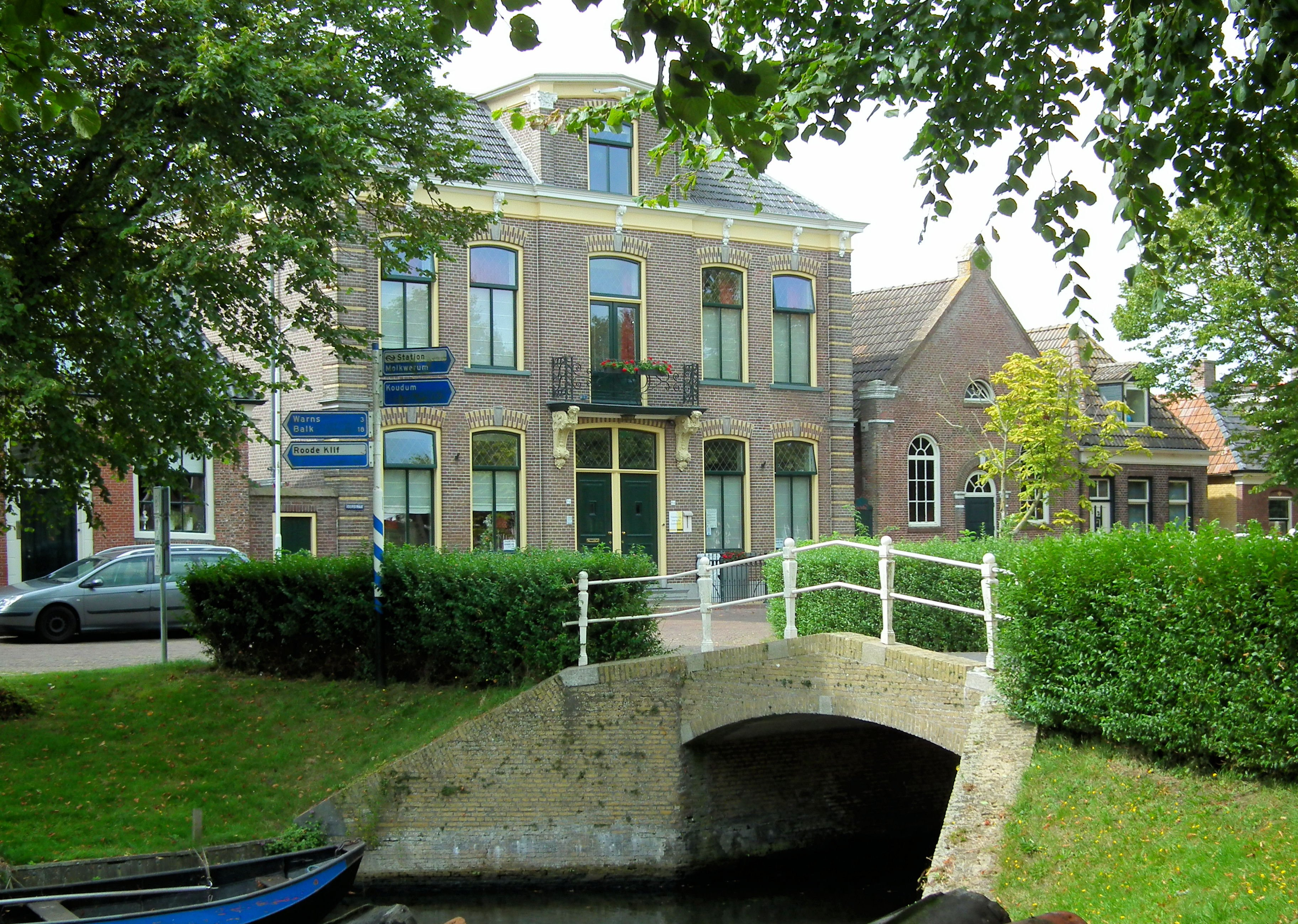
- City centre

- Flag Coat of arms

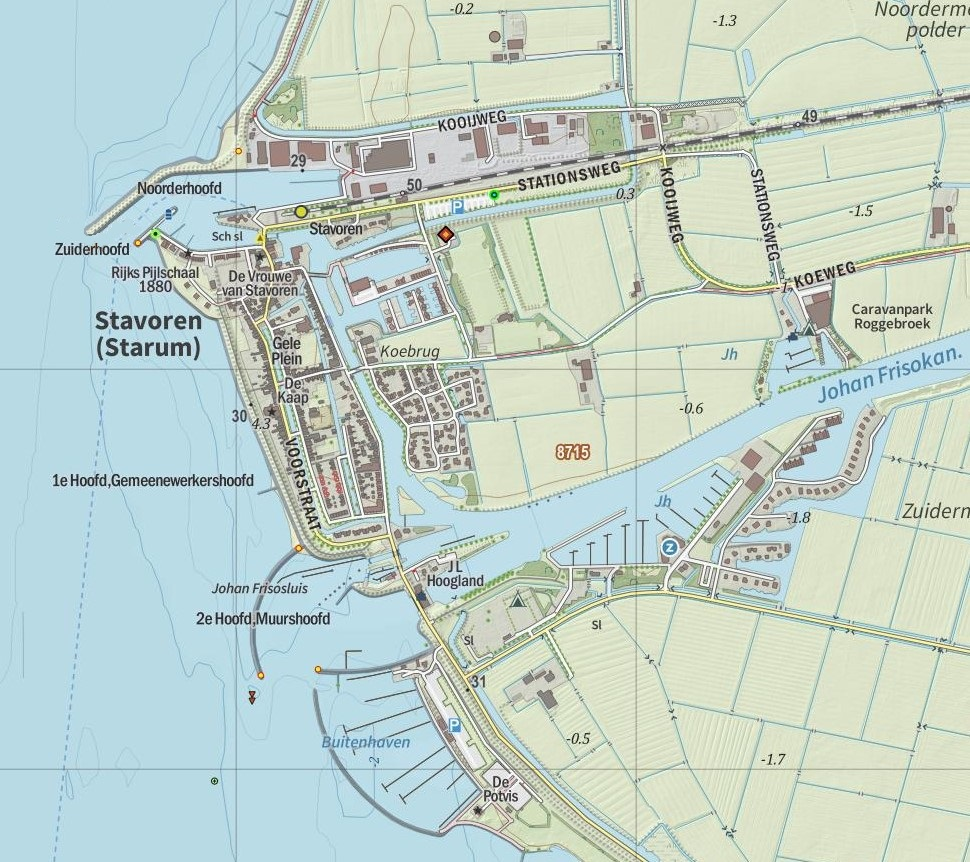
- Map of Stavoren (2019)

- Location in the Netherlands Stavoren (Netherlands)
- Country: Netherlands
- Province: Friesland
- Municipality: Súdwest-Fryslân

Population (2017)
  - Total: 950
- Time zone: UTC+1 (CET)
  - Summer (DST): UTC+2 (CEST)
- Postal code: 8715
- Telephone area: 0514

Stavoren (Dutch pronunciation: [ˈstaːvərə(n)]; West Frisian: Starum [ˈstaːrəm]; previously Staveren) is a city in the province of Friesland, Netherlands, on the coast of the IJsselmeer, about 5 km (3.1 mi) south of Hindeloopen, in the municipality of Súdwest-Fryslân.

Stavoren had a population of 950 in January 2017. It is one of the stops on the Elfstedentocht (English: "eleven cities tour"), an ice skating contest that occurs when the winter temperatures provide safe conditions. A ferry for pedestrians and cyclists operates between Stavoren and Enkhuizen, with increased frequency during summer months. The Friese Kustpad, a 131 kilometres (81 miles) long-distance trail to Lauwersoog, begins in Stavoren.

== History ==
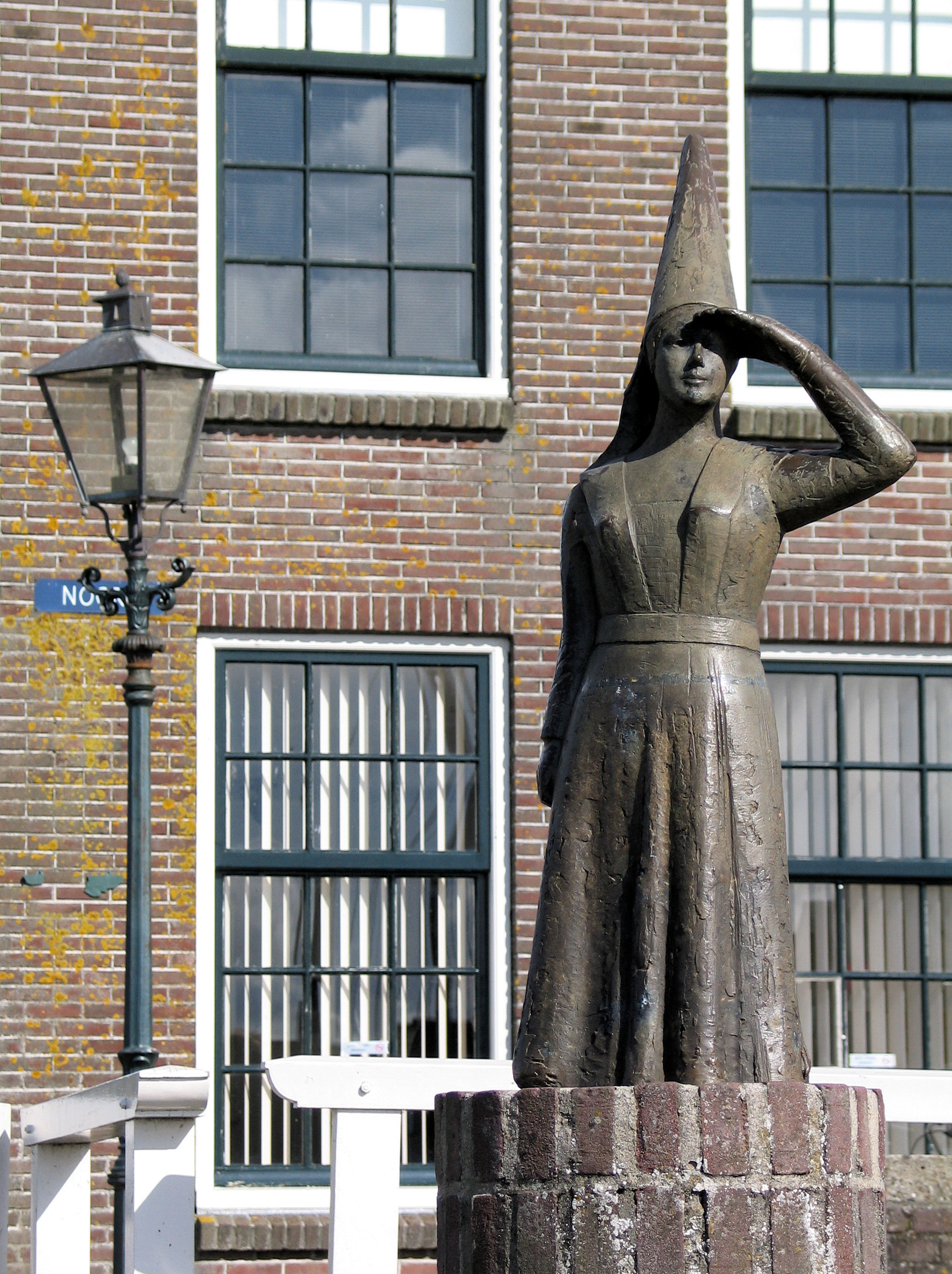
The Lady of Stavoren, 1969 statue

The historical Stavoren was granted city rights between 1060 and 1067, making it the oldest city in Friesland. It is mentioned in early texts as the burial place of the early kings of Friesland, including the first Christian king Adgil II (d. 730), who was a son of Redbad, the last pagan king who lived from about 670 to 719. Stavoren was the site of a memorable battle on 26 September 1345 where the count of Holland William IV "the Bold" lost his life.

Stavoren began to decline in the late Middle Ages after a sandbank formed outside the harbour, blocking ships from entering and exiting. The appearance of the sandbank is the topic of the Dutch Renaissance folk-tale of the Lady of Stavoren. In 1657, the entire town was submerged in a great flood.

Before 2011, the city was part of the Nijefurd municipality and before 1984 Stavoren was an independent municipality.

== Notable people ==
Notable people from Stavoren include:

- Andreas Cornelius (died 1589), musician and historian
- Bendiks Cazemier (born 1931), politician
- Bernhard van Haersma Buma (1932–2020), politician and writer
- Marijke ten Cate (born 1974), illustrator
- Age Hains Boersma (born 1982), football player

== Climate ==
Climate data for Stavoren (1991−2020 normals, extremes 1990−present)
Month	Jan	Feb	Mar	Apr	May	Jun	Jul	Aug	Sep	Oct	Nov	Dec	Year
Record high °C (°F)	12.4 (54.3)	16.2 (61.2)	20.8 (69.4)	26.2 (79.2)	30.1 (86.2)	31.8 (89.2)	36.1 (97.0)	32.6 (90.7)	30.7 (87.3)	24.3 (75.7)	18.5 (65.3)	13.3 (55.9)	36.1 (97.0)
Mean daily maximum °C (°F)	4.9 (40.8)	5.4 (41.7)	8.6 (47.5)	12.9 (55.2)	16.6 (61.9)	19.0 (66.2)	21.4 (70.5)	21.4 (70.5)	18.2 (64.8)	13.7 (56.7)	9.0 (48.2)	5.8 (42.4)	13.1 (55.6)
Daily mean °C (°F)	3.1 (37.6)	3.2 (37.8)	5.7 (42.3)	9.2 (48.6)	12.8 (55.0)	15.6 (60.1)	17.9 (64.2)	18.0 (64.4)	15.0 (59.0)	11.1 (52.0)	7.1 (44.8)	3.9 (39.0)	10.2 (50.4)
Mean daily minimum °C (°F)	1.0 (33.8)	0.9 (33.6)	2.8 (37.0)	5.4 (41.7)	9.0 (48.2)	12.1 (53.8)	14.4 (57.9)	14.4 (57.9)	11.7 (53.1)	8.2 (46.8)	4.8 (40.6)	1.8 (35.2)	7.2 (45.0)
Record low °C (°F)	−15.8 (3.6)	−20.3 (−4.5)	−18.9 (−2.0)	−5.6 (21.9)	0.0 (32.0)	4.5 (40.1)	7.3 (45.1)	6.1 (43.0)	3.7 (38.7)	−4.2 (24.4)	−7.7 (18.1)	−10.5 (13.1)	−20.3 (−4.5)
Average precipitation mm (inches)	65.9 (2.59)	51.3 (2.02)	46.7 (1.84)	36.7 (1.44)	49.5 (1.95)	56.5 (2.22)	65.9 (2.59)	90.5 (3.56)	76.2 (3.00)	79.2 (3.12)	67.7 (2.67)	69.1 (2.72)	755.2 (29.73)
Average relative humidity (%)	90.6	88.9	85.6	81.0	78.9	80.0	80.3	80.5	84.0	87.2	90.7	91.2	84.9
Mean monthly sunshine hours	72.6	100.0	156.4	213.8	242.4	229.5	236.6	216.6	165.1	123.9	69.3	62.8	1,889
Percentage possible sunshine	28.5	35.8	42.4	51.1	49.5	45.5	46.7	47.3	43.2	37.5	26.3	26.4	40.0
Source: Royal Netherlands Meteorological Institute
