= Tertinia gens =

Ancient Roman family

The gens Tertinia was an obscure plebeian family at ancient Rome. No members of this gens are mentioned in history, but a number are known from inscriptions, largely dating from the second and third centuries.

== Origin ==
The nomen Tertinius belongs to a class of gentilicia formed using the suffix -inius, typically derived from cognomina ending in -inus, but sometimes from other names. Here the root appears to be Tertius, "third", a common surname throughout Roman history. Although a number of Tertii are found in epigraphy from Rome itself, the rest were widely dispersed throughout the provinces, especially in Gaul, Germania, and Noricum.

== Praenomina ==
The main praenomina of the Tertinii were Lucius, Titus, and Gaius, each of which was amongst the most common names at all periods of Roman history. A few Tertinii bore other common names, including Marcus, Publius, and Quintus, while one member of this family in Gallia Belgica bore the rare praenomen Tertius.

== Members ==
This list includes abbreviated praenomina. For an explanation of this practice, see filiation.

- Tertinia, named in a sepulchral inscription from Salona in Dalmatia, dating from the first century, or the first half of the second.
- Tertinia Florentinia, a young woman descended from the Suebi, buried at Haedui in Gallia Lugdunensis, aged sixteen, in a tomb dating from the first half of the second century.
- Gaius Tertinius Statutus, formerly an aedile, buried at Virunum in Noricum, in a tomb built by his wife, Catronia Severa, dating from the first half of the second century.
- Tertinia Aurelia, buried in a second-century tomb built by Marius Saturninus at Vienna in Gallia Narbonensis.
- (Tertinius) Tertius, buried at the present site of Enghagen, formerly part of Noricum, aged one hundred and ten, in a family sepulchre built by his son, Tertinius Terentius, along with his wife, Respecta, aged ninety, his son, and his daughter-in-law, Rufia Helpis. The monument dates from the middle portion of the second century, and was inscribed by his granddaughter, Tertinia Grata.
- Tertinius Terentius, built a family sepulchre at the present site of Enghagen, dating from the mid-second century, for himself, his wife, Rufia Helpis, and his parents, Tertius and Respecta. The monument was inscribed by his daughter, Tertinia Grata.
- Tertinia Grata, the daughter of Tertinius Terentius and Rufia Helpis, and granddaughter of Tertius and Respecta, inscribed a monument at the site of modern Enghagen, dating from the middle part of the second century, for her parents and grandparents.
- Tertinius Firminus, made an offering to the local deity at Virunum, recorded in an inscription dating between the first and third century.
- Tertinius Herculanus, erected a monument at Timacum Minus in Moesia Superior, dating between the first and third century.
- Tertinia Tertina, buried at Virunum in a tomb built by her grandfather, dating between the first and third century.
- Tertius Tertinius Ursulus, named in an inscription from Treveri in Gallia Belgica, dating between the first and third century.
- Tertinius Tertinus, one of the donors to the restoration of the temple of Mithras at Virunum in AD 184.
- Tertinia Sabina, buried at the site of modern Pfannberg, formerly part of Noricum, aged thirty-two, with a monument from her husband, Gaius Vitalius Vitulus, dating between the middle of the second century, and the early part of the third.
- Tertinia Cossula, the wife of Pruscus Magio, and mother of Acaunissa, who built a tomb at Orolaunum in Gallia Belgica for his parents, dating between the middle of the second century, and the middle of the third.
- Tertinius Restitutus, dedicated a cinerarium at Confluentes in Germania Superior for himself and his late wife, Messonia Ammossa, dating between the middle portion of the second century, and the middle of the third.
- Titus Tertinius Virilis, made two offerings to Nehalennia at Ganventa in Gallia Belgica, one of them together with Marius Agilis, dating between the middle of the second century, and the middle of the third.
- Titus Tertinius, a librarius, either a scribe or a seller of books, made an offering to Minerva at Corstopitum in Britannia, dating to some point between the death of Hadrian and the end of the third century.
- Lucius Tertinius Sextus, dedicated a tomb at Vienna for his wife, Cominia Severina, dating between the middle of the second century, and the end of the third. He might be the same person as the husband of Valeria Attica.
- Lucius Tertinius Sextus, dedicated a tomb at Vienna for his wife, Valeria Attica. He may be the same person as the husband of Cominia Severina.
- Titus Tertinius Marcianus, a cavalry decurion buried at Rome, aged thirty-two, having served fourteen years, along with his son, Gaius, in a tomb built by his friend and colleague, the decurion Julius Julianus, dating from the latter half of the second century.
- Tertinius Catullinus, decurion of a town in Germania Superior, made an offering to Hercules at the present site of Friedberg, dating from the late second century, or the first half of the third.
- Tertinius Senecio, a soldier in the Legio XXII Primigenia, made an offering to Mars, Victoria, and Fortuna at Mogontiacum in Germania Superior in AD 194.
- Lucius Tertinius Vitalis, a soldier in the tenth cohort of the Praetorian Guard, recognized in a military diploma from the site of modern Inotapuszta, formerly part of Pannonia Superior, dating from AD 206.
- Titus Tertinius Vitalis, a native of Celeia in Pannonia Superior, was a soldier in the century of Agricola, named in an inscription from Rome, dating from AD 206.
- Tertinius Justus, a sebaciarius, a watchman responsible for detecting fires at Rome, named on a plaster inscription from the early third century.
- Quintus Tertinius Faustinus, a soldier in the Legio XXII Primigenia, buried at Canusium in Apulia, in a tomb dating from the time of the Severan Dynasty, and built by Lucius Moderatius Tertinus, another soldier.
- Tertinia Amabilis, also known as Cyrilla, a native of Nicomedia in Bithynia and Pontus, buried at Lugdunum, along with her husband, Tertinius Gessus, in a tomb dating from the first half of the third century. They were married for eighteen years, twenty days.
- Tertinius Gessus, a veteran of the Legio VIII Augusta, buried at Lugdunum, along with his wife, Tertinia Amabilis, in a tomb dating from the first half of the third century. They were married for eighteen years, twenty days.
- Tertinia Victorina, the wife of Exomnius Paternianus, a centurion, and mother of Tertinius Severianus, a centurion in the Legio II Augusta, Paternia Victorina, and Tertinia Tertina, as well as another daughter, Paternia. She and Paternia Victorina dedicated a tomb at Lugdunum for Exomnius Paternianus and Paternia, while her other children dedicated a tomb for their mother, both dating from the first half of the third century.
- Tertinius Vitalis, a soldier in the Legio XXX Ulpia Victrix, made an offering to Jupiter Optimus Maximus at Colonia Ulpia Trajana in Germania Inferior on the sixth day before the Kalends of May (April 26) in AD 232.
- Tertinius Abrosus, named in a dedicatory inscription from Mogontiacum, dated the tenth day before the Kalends of September (August 23), AD 236.
- Tertinius Justinus, the son of Probia Justina, who made an offering to the local goddess at Tolbiacum in Germania Inferior on her son's behalf in AD 239.
- Tertinius No[...], made an offering to Jupiter Optimus Maximus and Juno Regina at Nida in Germania Superior, dating from the third century.

=== Undated Tertinii ===
- Tertinia, named in a sepulchral inscription from Axati in Hispania Baetica.
- Publius Tertinius, a potter whose maker's mark was found at Lugdunum.
- Titus Tertinius, one of the municipal duumvirs of Colonia Ulpia Trajana in Gallia Belgica.
- Tertinius Firmanus, made an offering to the local goddess at the modern site of Embken, now part of Nideggen, formerly part of Germania Inferior.
- Marcus Tertinius Gratus, a potter whose maker's mark was found on pottery from Tolosa in Gallia Narbonensis.
- Tertinius Herculianus, buried at Colonia Claudia Ara Agrippinensium in Germania Inferior, with a monument from his wife, Natalinia Sancta.
- Tertinius Maximianus, buried at Dea Augusta Vocontiorum in Gallia Narbonensis, with a monument from his wife, Verilla.
- Tertinius Modestus, made an offering to Pritona on behalf of the inhabitants of Contiomagus in Gallia Belgica.
- Lucius Tertinius Paulus, a potter at Lugdunum in Gallia Lugdunensis; he may be identical with a maker of lead pipes by the same name.
- Tertinius Primitivus, made an offering to Nehalennia at Ganventa.
- Tertinius Quartinus, along with Sentius Atticus, made an offering to Nehalennia at Ganventa.
- Tertinius Secundus, a descendant of the Nervii, was a negotiator pistoricius, or fish merchant, who built a tomb at Colonia Claudia Ara Agrippinensium for his wife, Priminia Sabina, and daughter, Tertinia.
- Tertinia, the daughter of Tertinia Secundus, buried at Colonia Claudia Ara Agrippinensium, along with her mother, Priminia Sabina.
- Tertinius Severus, a soldier in the Legio VIII Augusta, made an offering to Jupiter Optimus Maximus and Juno Regina at the site of modern Waldorf, formerly part of Germania Superior.
- Tertinius Similis, made an offering to the local deity at the site of modern Floisdorf, formerly part of Germania Inferior.
- Gaius Tertinius Similis, together with Gaius Victorinius, made an offering to the local deity at the site of modern Inden, formerly part of Germania Inferior.
- Tertinius Suitulus, buried at Mogontiacum.
- Tertinius Ursus, a young man buried at Lugdunum, aged nineteen years, four months.
- Lucius Tertinius Victor, made an offering to Nehalennia at Ganventa.
- Tertinia Victorina, buried at Tubusuctu in Mauretania Caesariensis, with a monument from her daughter, Donata.

== See also ==
- List of Roman gentes

== Bibliography ==
- Theodor Mommsen et alii, Corpus Inscriptionum Latinarum (The Body of Latin Inscriptions, abbreviated CIL), Berlin-Brandenburgische Akademie der Wissenschaften (1853–present).
- Frane Bulić, Mihovil Abramić, Bulletin d'archéologie et d'histoire dalmate (Archaeological and Historical Bulletin of Dalmatia), Arheološki muzej u Splitu, Arheološki muzej u Zadru (1878–present)
- René Cagnat et alii, L'Année épigraphique (The Year in Epigraphy, abbreviated AE), Presses Universitaires de France (1888–present).
- George Davis Chase, "The Origin of Roman Praenomina", in Harvard Studies in Classical Philology, vol. VIII, pp. 103–184 (1897).
- La Carte Archéologique de la Gaule (Archaeological Map of Gaul, abbreviated CAG), Académie des Inscriptions et Belles-Lettres (1931–present).
- Epigraphica, Rivista Italiana di Epigrafia (1939–present).
- Brigitte and Hartmut Galsterer, Die Römischen Steininschriften aus Köln (The Roman Stone Inscriptions of Cologne, abbreviated RSK), Cologne (1975).
- Annona Epigraphica Austriaca (Epigraphy of Austria Annual, abbreviated AEA) (1979–present).
- Hispania Epigraphica (Epigraphy of Spain), Madrid (1989–present).
