= 145452 Ritona =

Classical Kuiper belt object

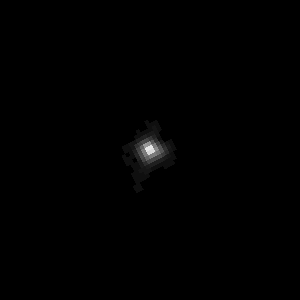
- Ritona imaged by the Hubble Space Telescope on 25 April 2010

Discovery
- Discovered by: Andrew C. Becker; Andrew W. Puckett; Jeremy M. Kubica
- Discovery site: Apache Point Obs.
- Discovery date: 10 September 2005

Designations
- Named after: Ritona
- Alternative designations: 2005 RN_{43}
- Minor planet category: TNO; classical (hot); distant; Scat-Ext

Orbital characteristics (barycentric)
- Epoch 5 May 2025 (JD 2460800.5)
- Uncertainty parameter 0
- Observation arc: 70.99 yr (25930 days)
- Earliest precovery date: 2 June 1954
- Aphelion: 42.450 AU
- Perihelion: 40.575 AU
- Semi-major axis: 41.512 AU
- Eccentricity: 0.0226
- Orbital period (sidereal): 267.29 yr (97,627 d)
- Mean anomaly: 352.812°
- Mean motion: 0° 0^{m} 13.275^{s} / day
- Inclination: 19.274°
- Longitude of ascending node: 186.989°
- Time of perihelion: ≈ 15 June 2029
- Argument of perihelion: 172.899°
- Known satellites: 0

Physical characteristics
- Mean diameter: 679+55 −73 km
- Sidereal rotation period: 6.946±0.05 h (single-peaked) (Note: The rotation period of Ritona was measured by observing how its brightness changes over time, which is plotted as a light curve. If Ritona has a spheroidal shape, then its light curve should resemble a "single-peaked" sine wave, whereas if Ritona is elongated, then its light curve should resemble a "double-peaked" sine wave.); or 13.892±0.05 h (double-peaked)
- Geometric albedo: 0.107+0.029 −0.018
- Temperature: 43.2 K (perihelion)
- Spectral type: CO_{2}-type ("double-dip"); IR–RR (red); B–V = 0.95±0.02; V–R = 0.59±0.01; V–I = 1.08±0.02
- Apparent magnitude: ≈ 20 (average); 20.16±0.03
- Absolute magnitude (H): 3.882±0.036 (2016); 3.89±0.05 (2012); 3.69 (JPL)

145452 Ritona (provisional designation 2005 RN_{43}) is a large trans-Neptunian object orbiting the Sun in the Kuiper belt. It was discovered on 10 September 2005 by astronomers Andrew Becker, Andrew Puckett and Jeremy Kubica at Apache Point Observatory in Sunspot, New Mexico. Ritona has a measured diameter of 679+55
−73 km, which is large enough that some astronomers consider it a possible dwarf planet.

Ritona has a dark and reddish surface made of water ice, carbon dioxide ice, carbon monoxide ice, and various organic compounds (tholins). Observations by the James Webb Space Telescope have shown that carbon dioxide ice is more abundant than water ice in Ritona's surface, which suggests that there is a thin layer of carbon dioxide ice covering Ritona's surface. Ritona is not known to have any natural satellites or moons, which means there is currently no way to measure its mass and density.

== History ==
=== Discovery ===
Ritona was discovered by astronomers Andrew Becker, Andrew Puckett and Jeremy Kubica on 10 September 2005, during observations for the Sloan Digital Sky Survey. The discovery observations were made using the 2.5-meter telescope at Apache Point Observatory in Sunspot, New Mexico. The discoverers further observed Ritona until November 2005 and found the object in precovery observations from dates as early as June 2001. The discovery of Ritona was announced by the Minor Planet Center on 23 July 2006. Since then, Ritona has been found in even earlier precovery observations dating back to June 1954.

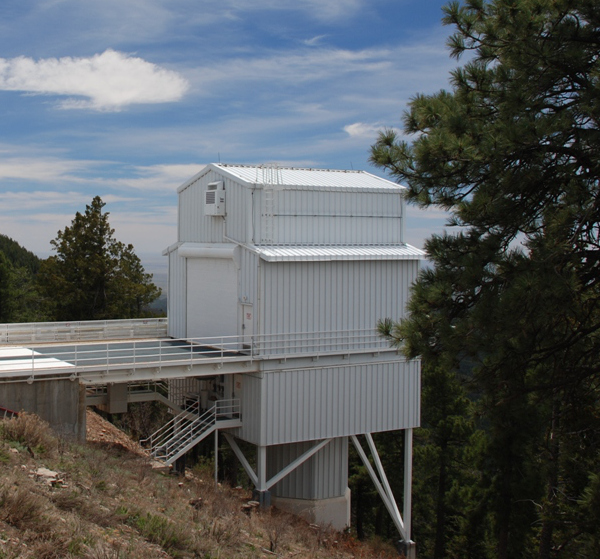
Ritona was discovered in 2005 by Apache Point Observatory's 2.5-meter telescope in Sunspot, New Mexico (pictured)

Ritona photographed in color by Apache Point Observatory's Sloan Digital Sky Survey on 18 and 19 October 2003, showing the object's slow movement across the sky

=== Name and number ===
The object is named after Ritona, the Celtic goddess of river fords. The naming of this object was announced by the International Astronomical Union's Working Group for Small Body Nomenclature on 21 July 2025. Before Ritona was officially named, it was known by its provisional designation 2005 RN_{43}, which indicates the year and half-month of the object's discovery date. Ritona's minor planet catalog number of 145452 was given by the Minor Planet Center on 5 December 2006.

== Orbit and classification ==
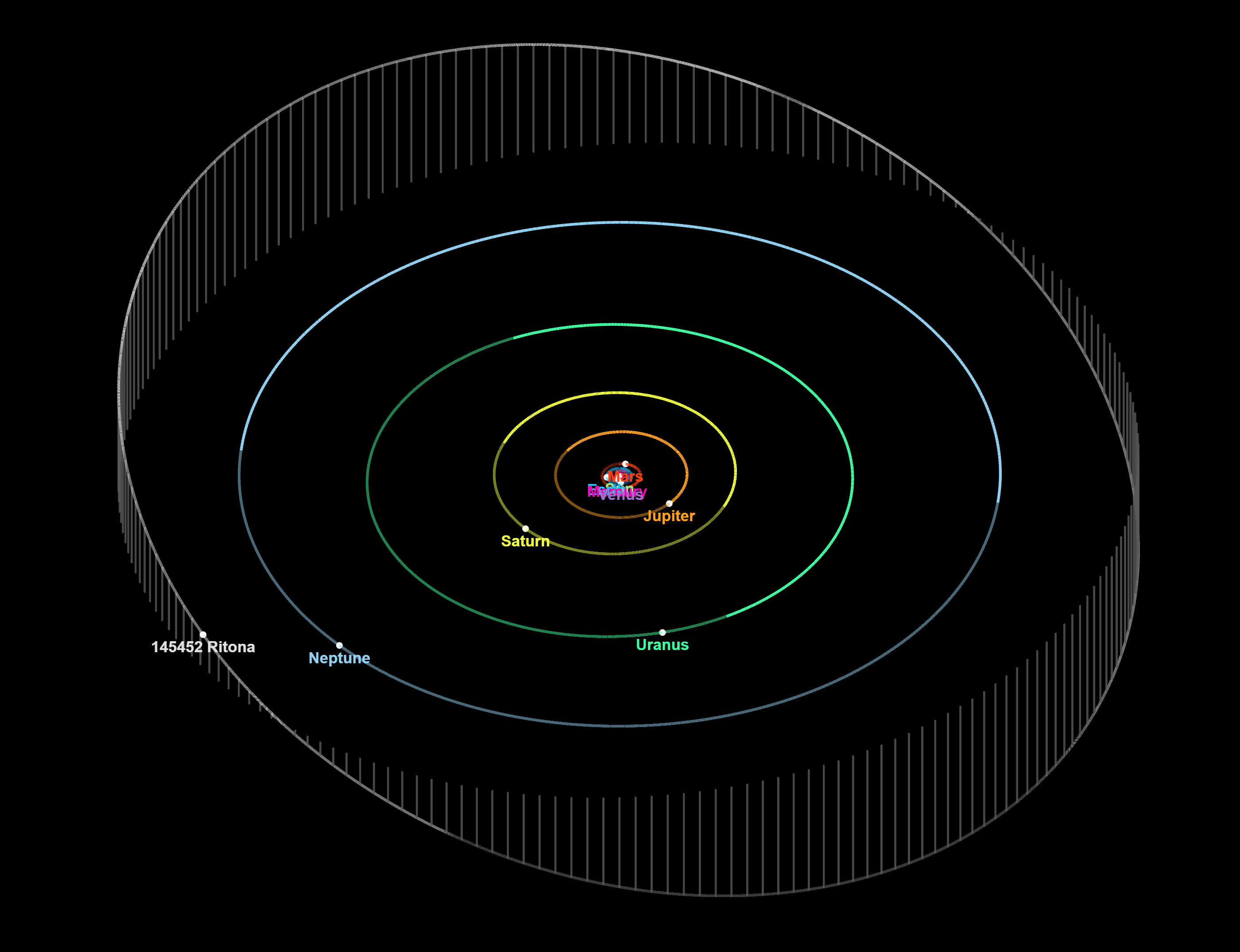
Diagram showing Ritona's inclined orbit (gray) around the Sun, with the outer planets shown. The vertical gray lines along Ritona's orbital path mark its positions above and below the ecliptic plane.

=== Orbital characteristics ===
Ritona is a trans-Neptunian object orbiting the Sun at a semi-major axis or average distance of 41.5 astronomical units (AU). (Note: These orbital elements are expressed in terms of the Solar System Barycenter (SSB) as the frame of reference. Due to planetary perturbations, the Sun revolves around the SSB at non-negligible distances, so heliocentric-frame orbital elements and distances can vary in short timescales as shown in JPL-Horizons.) It follows a moderately inclined and nearly circular orbit, with a low eccentricity of 0.02 and inclination of 19.3° with respect to the ecliptic. In its 267-year-long orbit, Ritona comes as close as 40.6 AU from the Sun at perihelion and as far as 42.5 AU from the Sun at aphelion. Ritona last passed perihelion in November 1760 and will make its next perihelion passage on 15 April 2029.

=== Classification ===
Ritona is located in the classical region of the Kuiper belt 39–48 AU from the Sun, and is thus classified as a classical Kuiper belt object (sometimes known as a "cubewano"). The high orbital inclination of Ritona makes it a dynamically "hot" member of the classical Kuiper belt. The hot classical Kuiper belt objects are believed to have been scattered by Neptune's gravitational influence during the Solar System's early history.

== Physical characteristics ==
=== Size ===
Ritona has a diameter of 679 km (422 mi) (full range 606 to 734 km or 377 to 456 mi when including uncertainties), according to thermal emission measurements by the infrared Herschel Space Observatory. Ritona is large enough that some astronomers consider it a possible dwarf planet.

However, based on its size of 606 to 734 km, it belongs to the proposed class of "mid-sized" TNOs between 400 and 1,000 km (250 and 620 mi) in diameter, which are believed to represent the transition between small, low-density TNOs and large, high-density dwarf planets. Planetary scientists have hypothesized that mid-sized TNOs should have highly porous and unheated interiors, because TNOs in this size range (namely Uni and Gǃkúnǁʼhòmdímà) have been found to have low densities around 1 g/cm^{3}.

=== Surface ===
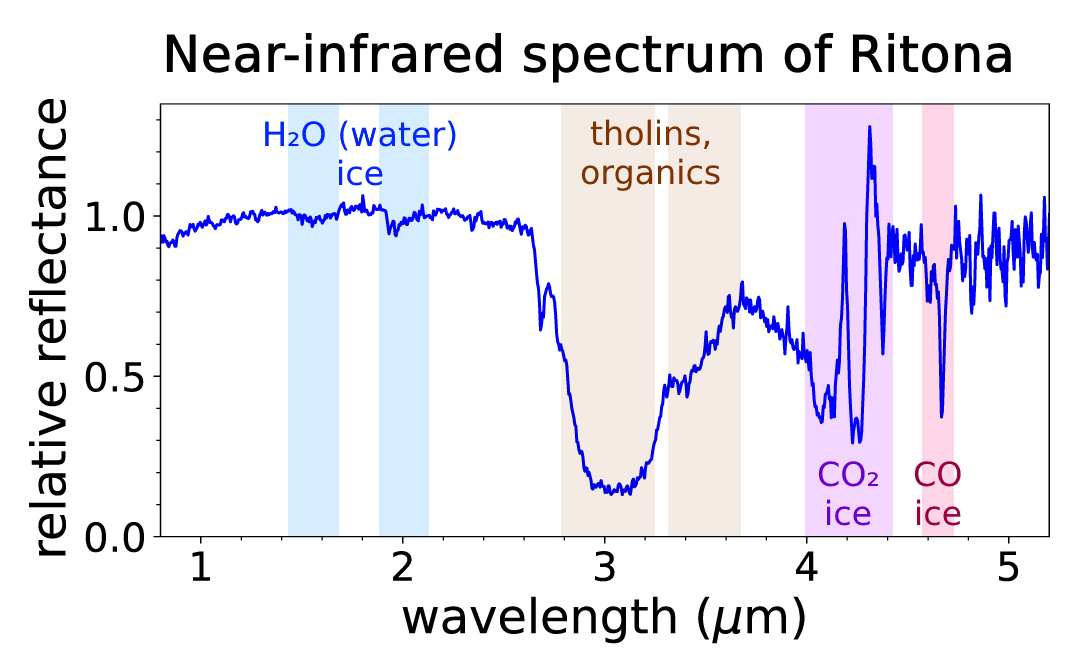
The near-infrared spectrum of Ritona, as seen by the James Webb Space Telescope's NIRSpec instrument. Absorption signatures of chemical compounds are highlighted and labeled with their respective names.

In visible light, the surface of Ritona appears dark and reddish in color, with a geometric albedo of about 0.11. Spectroscopic observations by the James Webb Space Telescope (JWST) in 2022 have shown that Ritona's surface is composed of water ice, carbon dioxide (CO_{2}) ice, carbon monoxide (CO) ice, and various organic compounds (tholins). Ritona shares this composition with the CO_{2}-type (aka "double-dip") trans-Neptunian objects, which are commonly found on dynamically excited orbits such as those in the hot classical Kuiper belt (where Ritona resides). (Note: The "double-dip" TNO spectral type were later renamed to the "CO_{2}-type" in 2025.)

Analysis of JWST's spectroscopic observations has shown that Ritona's surface is more abundant in CO_{2} ice than water ice, which suggests that Ritona's surface is covered with a thin (a few micrometres thick) layer of fine, micron-sized CO_{2} ice particles. CO ice is also abundant in Ritona's surface, contrary to theoretical predictions that CO should sublimate and escape from Ritona's surface at its temperature and distance from the Sun. Planetary scientists Michael E. Brown and Wesley C. Fraser have hypothesized that the Sun's ultraviolet light produces CO in Ritona's surface by irradiating and breaking down CO_{2} molecules, and leaves the CO trapped within the surrounding CO_{2} ice. A similar scenario has been hypothesized for (84522) 2002 TC302, another CO_{2}-rich Kuiper belt object observed by JWST.

The surface temperature of Ritona at perihelion (closest point to the Sun) is estimated to be approximately 43.2 Kelvin.

=== Rotation ===
As of 2018, observations of Ritona's brightness over time indicate it has a rotation period of either 6.946 or 13.892 hours, depending on whether the object's brightness variability is caused by surface albedo variations or an elongated shape. Studies from 2010 to 2018 have consistently shown that Ritona exhibits very little brightness variation (less than 0.06 magnitudes), which makes it difficult to accurately determine its rotation period. The small brightness variations of Ritona can be explained if it has a spheroidal shape with small albedo variations across its surface.

== See also ==
- List of possible dwarf planets
  - 90568 Goibniu – a classical Kuiper belt object and possible dwarf planet similar to Ritona in size
- List of Solar System objects by size
