= Vicus Wareswald =

Archaeological site in Saarland, Germany

Coordinates: 49.4947°N 7.0597°E

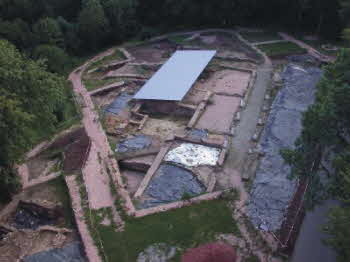
Aerial photo of excavations at Wareswald

Wareswald is an archaeological site comprising the remains of a Roman vicus (country town) in the district of Sankt Wendel in Saarland, Germany.

== Location and origins ==
The Gallo-Roman vicus of Wareswald is located in the Wareswald Wood in northern Saarland, within the towns of Oberthal, Marpingen, and Tholey. Since 2001 excavations have been conducted with the aim of revealing the appearance, structure, and chronology of the settlement.

The village originated in the first half of the first century A.D. at the intersection of two busy Roman roads. One road ran from Strasbourg (Roman Argentoratum) through the vicus of Schwarzenacker, now part of Homburg, to Trier (Augusta Treverorum). The other ran from Metz (Divodurum) by way of Dillingen-Pachten (Contiomagus), through Wareswald to Mainz (Mogontiacum). The settlement is located in the civitas of the Treveri, on its southeastern border with the civitas of the Mediomatrici. According to the current explanation for the origin of the village, the numerous travelers using the roads created a demand for goods and services, which was met by merchants and artisans who settled here. Possibly the road followed an Iron Age trade route, since fragmentary remains of an earlier Celtic settlement were found, identified by finds from the late La Tène period.

The existence of the settlement has long been known. A discredited folk etymology derives the name from that of the unlucky Roman general Varus. Local legends spoke of a "golden wagon buried in the earth with its shaft so near the surface that a hen could scratch it out". Archaeological investigation of the site took place at least as early as 1836.

== Extent and chronology ==
Through comprehensive geomagnetic studies and ground surveys, the extent of the vicus is well understood. It extended over a length of approximately 1,000 metres (3,300 ft) on the slopes along the road. Along this length the settlement area was terraced down the slope in a southerly and northerly direction. After the settlement's founding in the first century A.D., the population grew gradually, and the village reached its greatest extent of about 20 hectares (49 acres) during the prosperity of the second century. The economic decline of the third century also affected Wareswald.

The economic recovery throughout the region as Trier became an imperial residence in the early fourth century can also be seen Wareswald. During this period some buildings underwent major renovation. (See the section Temple of Mars below). Activity in the settlement appears in the archaeological record until the end of the fourth century, at which time the vicus was abandoned and fell into ruin. No medieval or modern building took place.

== Findings ==
=== Village center ===
In the village center an area of about 2,500 square metres (27,000 sq ft) has been excavated. The developed area stretched along the road, which was paralleled by drainage ditches and an arcade. So far three building complexes with different construction phases can be distinguished.

In its early stages of construction, the structure named Building D possessed an approximately 12.50 m × 7.50 m (41.0 ft × 24.6 ft) cellar, which was later divided by a cross wall. Because of its size it is assumed that this building served a dealer for storage of his goods. In a further rebuilding phase the basement was abandoned and filled in with clay. Above the basement is a representative room with subfloor heating (hypocaust) which was decorated with murals and had glazed windows. To the southwest there were two bathrooms measuring approximately 3.50 m × 3.50 m (11.5 ft × 11.5 ft). Their tubs were made of terrazzo, a waterproof mixture of white lime mortar and brick rubble. Another small annex in the southeast area, approximately 2 m × 2 m (6.6 ft × 6.6 ft) from the same building phase also had a heated floor and is interpreted as a heated bathing area. At this stage the building had a purely residential character. The adjacent buildings to the southwest and northeast, however, probably served tradesmen and artisans not only as living space but also as offices. In this area half-finished bronze statuettes were found, along with the stone weight of a beam balance, weighing 100 Roman pounds (about 30 kilograms [66 lb]), that would probably not have been installed in a private home. Since no building has a complete floor plan, little can be said about the typology of building plans. It is obvious, however, that in the excavated area there were none of the attached buildings that frequently occur in Roman roadside villages.

=== Temple of Mars ===
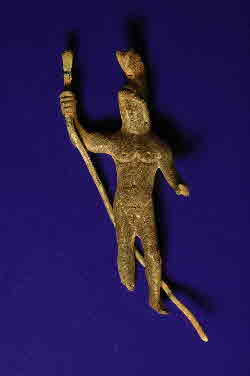
Statue of Mars from the temple, Vicus Wareswald

About 200 metres (660 ft) southwest of the excavations in the village center lie the remains of a temple of Mars. The temple was probably built in the second century A.D. and received a thoroughgoing renovation in the early fourth century. Most likely the resumption of building activity on public buildings in the village is related to the rise of Trier as an imperial residence, but there is no direct evidence. The walls uncovered to date were constructed with external pilasters in front. Once again, the plan is only partially excavated so only cautious conclusions can be made on the typology of rectangular temple. The northwest wall was protected by a parallel wall coated with red plaster on the outside. Nevertheless it cannot be described as a standard temple design. The discovery of two bronze nude figures of a youthful Mars wearing a plumed helmet, as well as numerous spearheads, make the assignment of the temple to the god of war appear justified. As with the excavations in the settlement core, the material finds, especially the sequence of coins, cease by the end of the fourth century. The area was never built over after that time.

=== Pillar grave monument ===
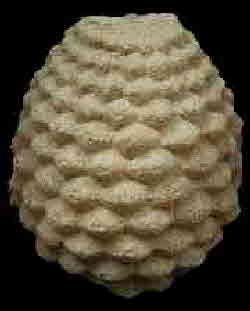
Pine cone finial from the pillar grave monument, Vicus Wareswald, Saarland

In the course of constructing a parking lot adjacent to the settlement area, hewn sandstone blocks were discovered. The excavation of the relief fragments, and especially of a 40-centimetre-high (16 in) pine cone, revealed them to be parts of a grave monument, called a pillar monument. Numerous fragments of the relief decoration showed nude figures from mythology, clothed figures – probably depictions of the family that erected the monument – and ocean and vineyard scenes. The inscription survives only as two large letters. The base of the pillars had a side length of 4.20 m × 3.80 m (13.8 ft × 12.5 ft). The examination of the salvaged architectural elements provided an estimate for the total height of the monument of about 10–12 m (33–39 ft). Situated directly on the Roman road, the monument not only served the cult of the dead but also displayed a representation of the family of the founder, who certainly had held a senior position in Wareswald. This pillar also testifies to the prosperity that existed in the heyday in the village. More systematic excavations will provide further insights into the settlement.
