= Museum Pachten =

Museum in Germany

Coordinates: 49°21′18″N 6°42′31″E

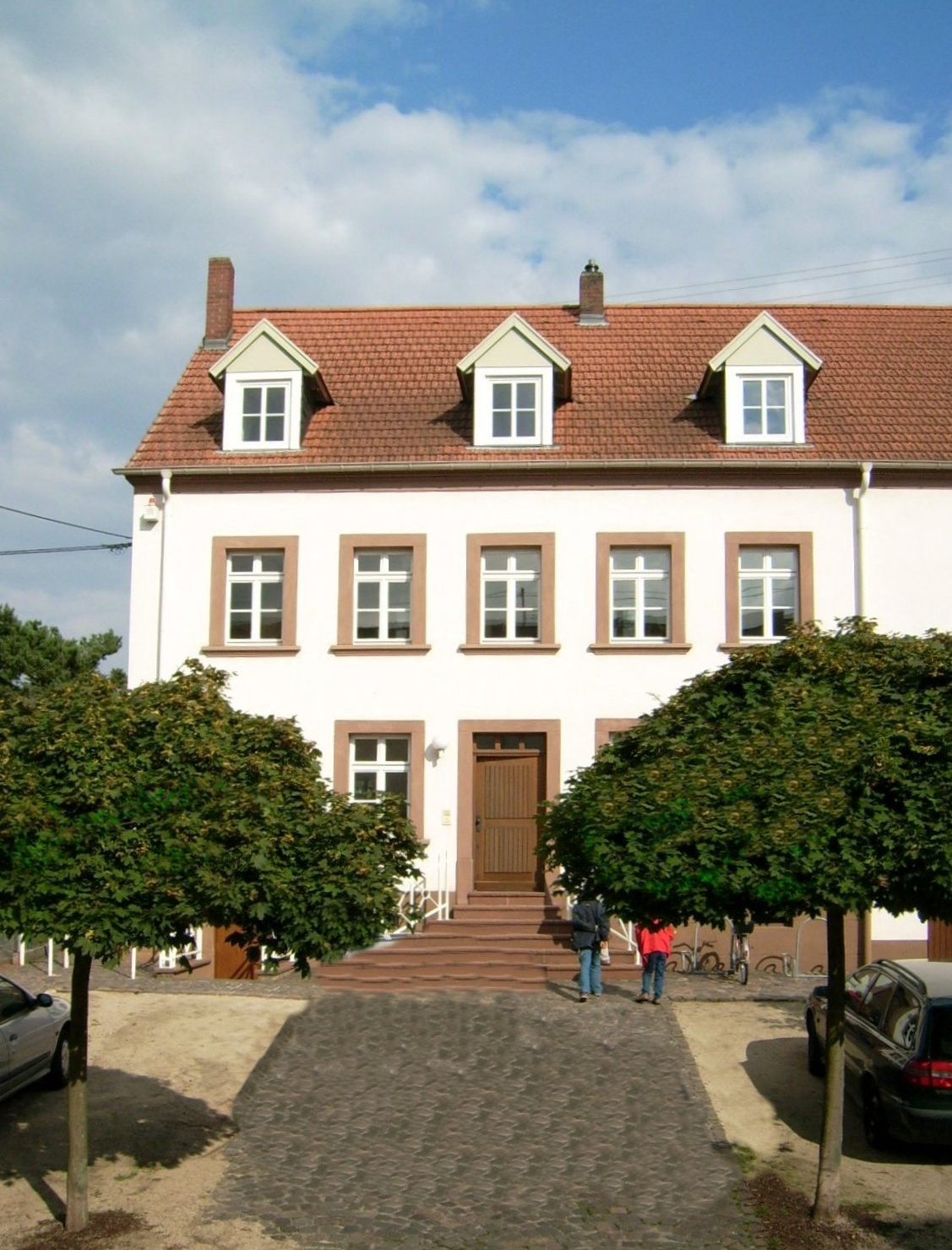

Museum Pachten, also known as the Römermuseum Pachten, is a museum in a former farmhouse in Fischerstraße, one of the oldest streets in the Dillingen district of Pachten, Saarland, Germany. The museum was established in 1990 and features displays related to the Gallo-Roman period in the Roman settlement of what was Contiomagus. Artifacts dated to the Stone Age, Bronze Age, Iron Age and the era of the Celts are also on display. In January 2022, Dr Jürgen von Ahn was appointed as manager of the museum.

== History and displays ==
Established in 1990, it contains artifacts related to the prehistory and early history of the district. The exhibition focuses on the Gallo-Roman period in the Roman settlement of Contiomagus in the area. Contiomagus was significant in that it was accessed by two Roman trunk roads, one which led from Metz to Mainz, and the other from Trier to Strasbourg.

The Roman origin of Pachten has been known since about the 17th century, though finds from the Stone Age, Bronze Age, Iron Age and the era of the Celts are also on display. A geological collection contains fossils and minerals from the surrounding area. There are two dark rooms where burial pits with Roman and Frankish burials can be seen. The original bedroom and domestic objects from the farm can be seen, and the gallery hosts temporary exhibitions. In the vicinity is a Roman park with a reconstructed Roman fort tower.

In January 2022, Dr Jürgen von Ahn became manager of the museum. After being appointed he was quoted as saying (in German) "I quickly realized how important the Roman history of Pachten is and how many extraordinary objects have been found here over the decades." In 2022 the museum temporarily closed for renovation.

== Gallery ==
Stone Age

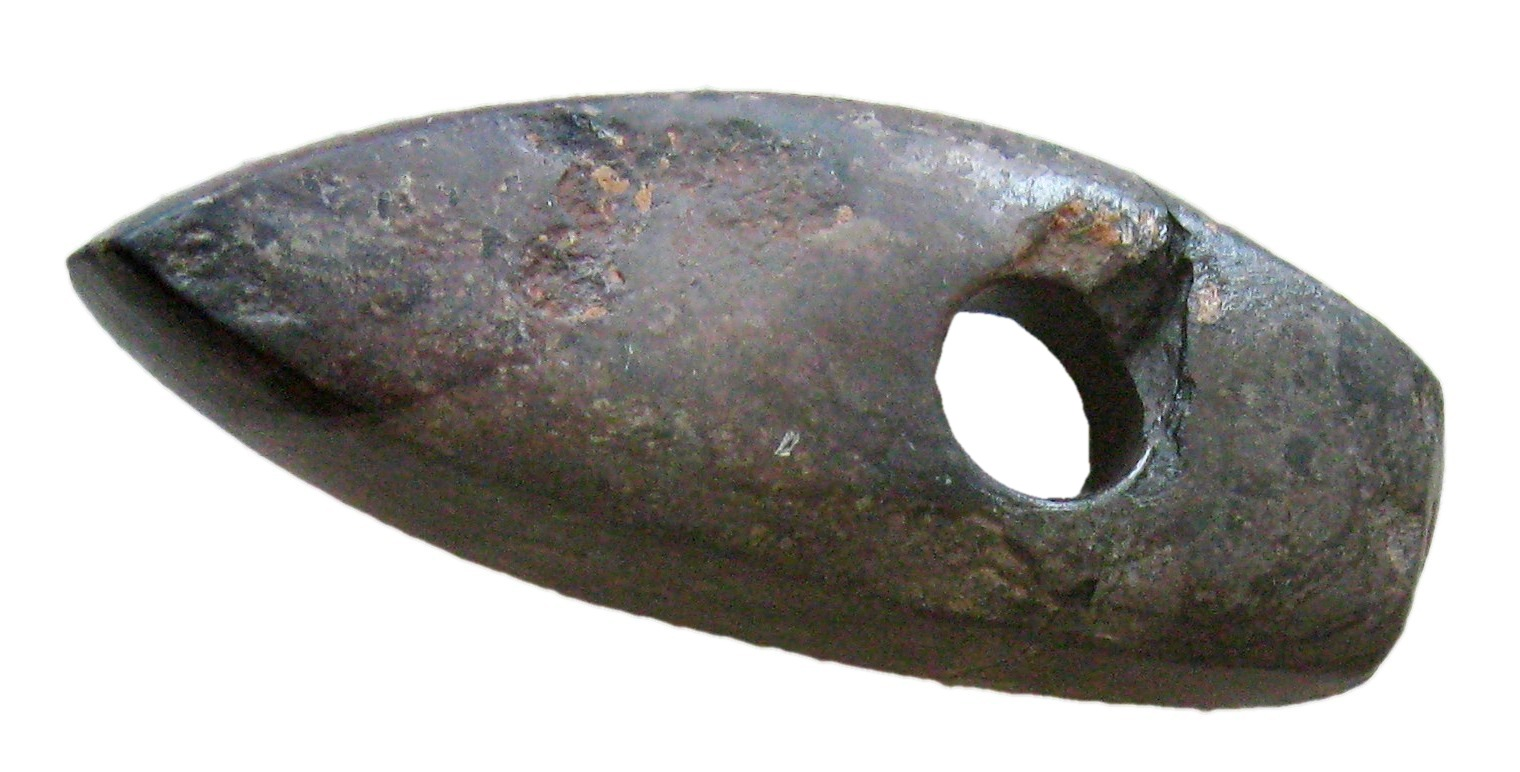
Stone axe

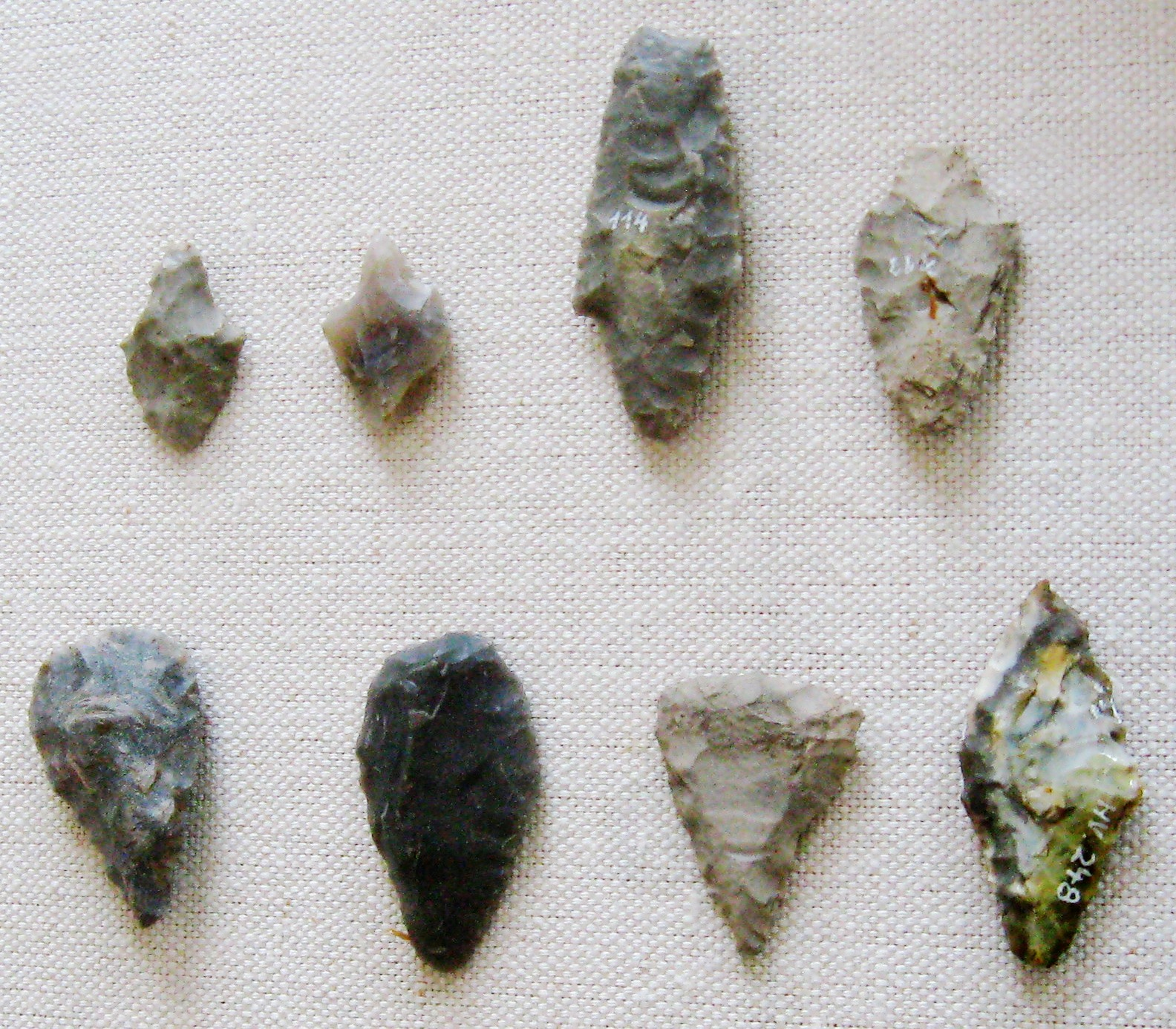
Arrow heads

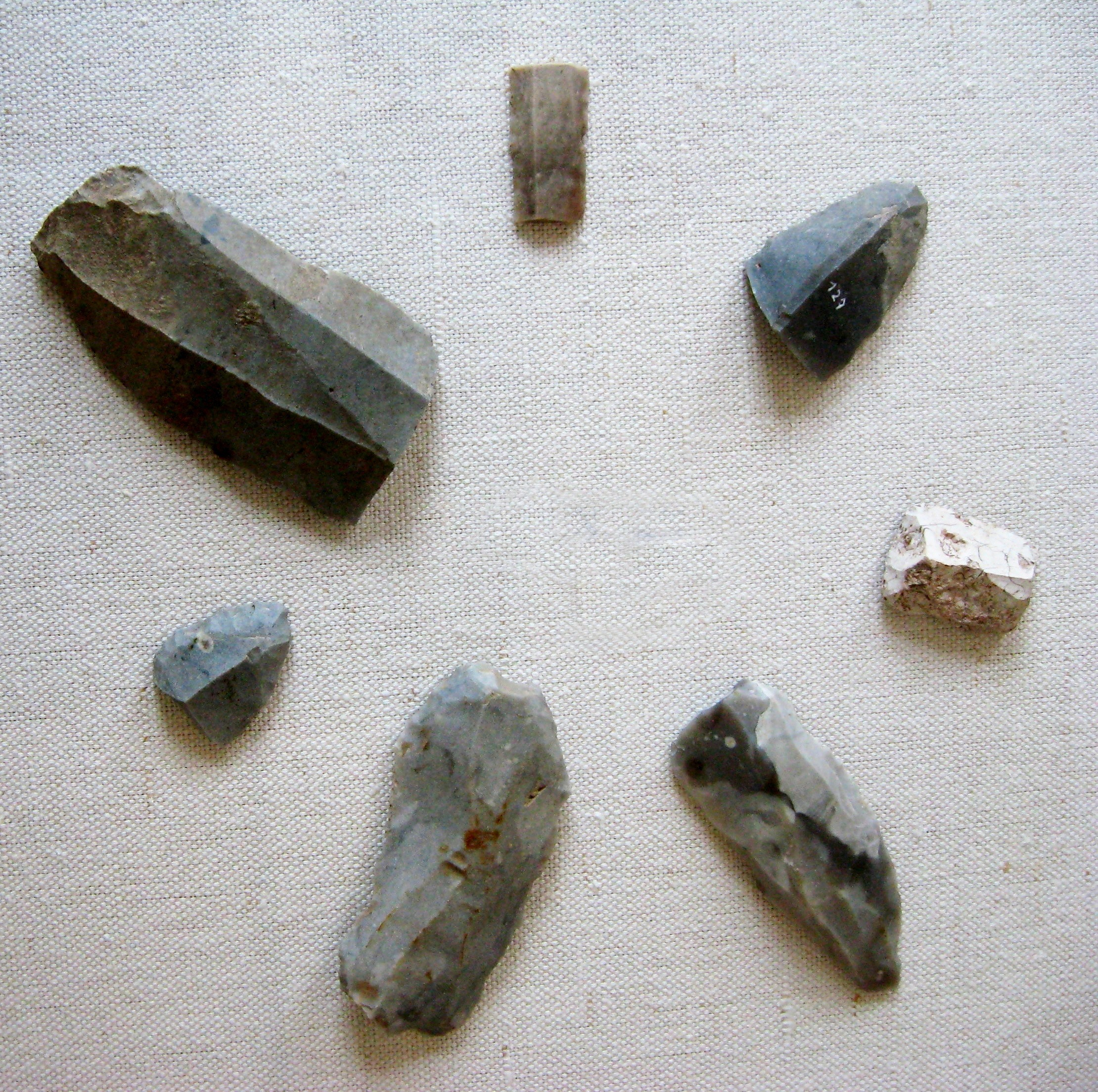
Stone blades
Roman Age

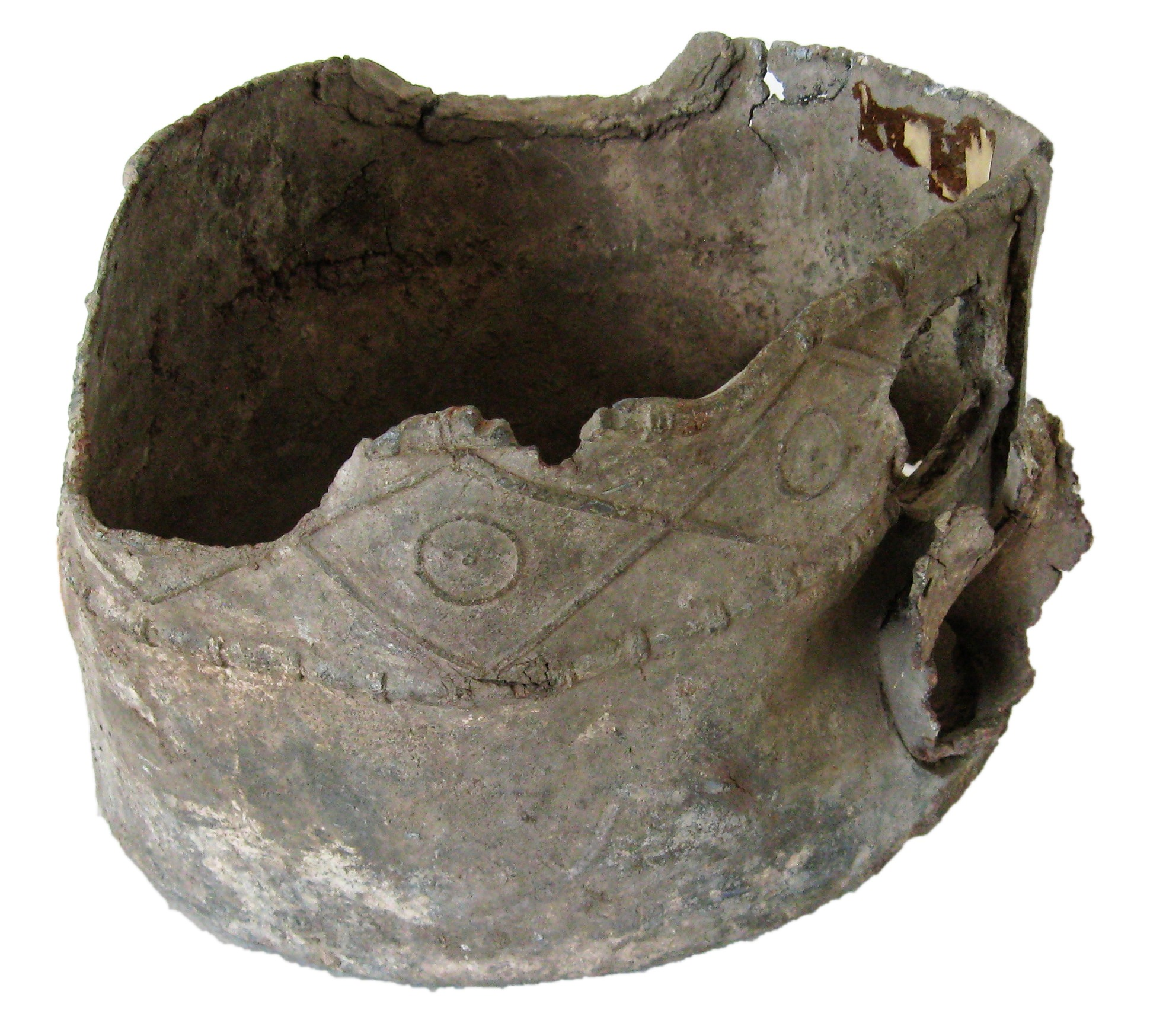
Roman water distribution pot made of lead

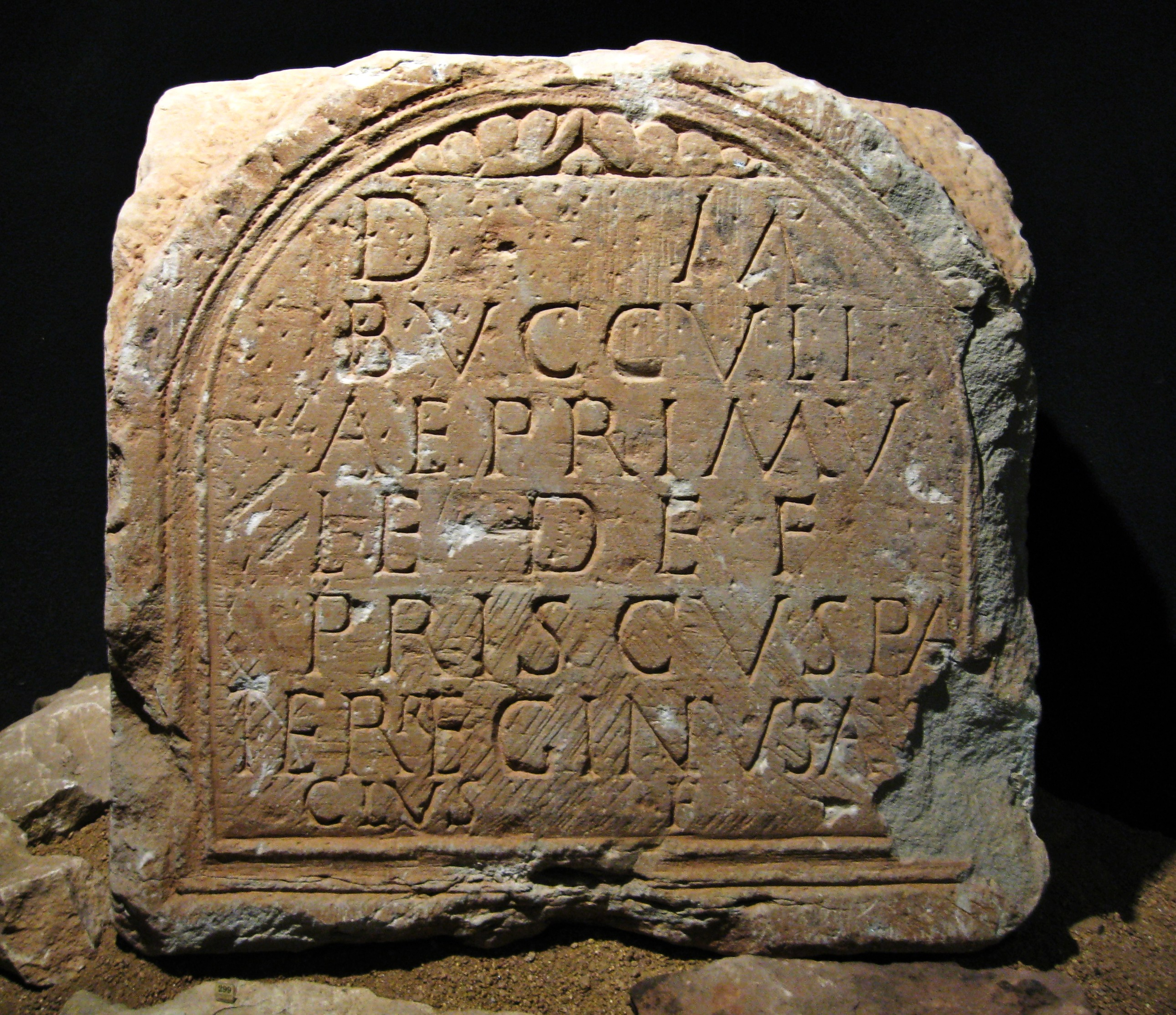
Tombstone

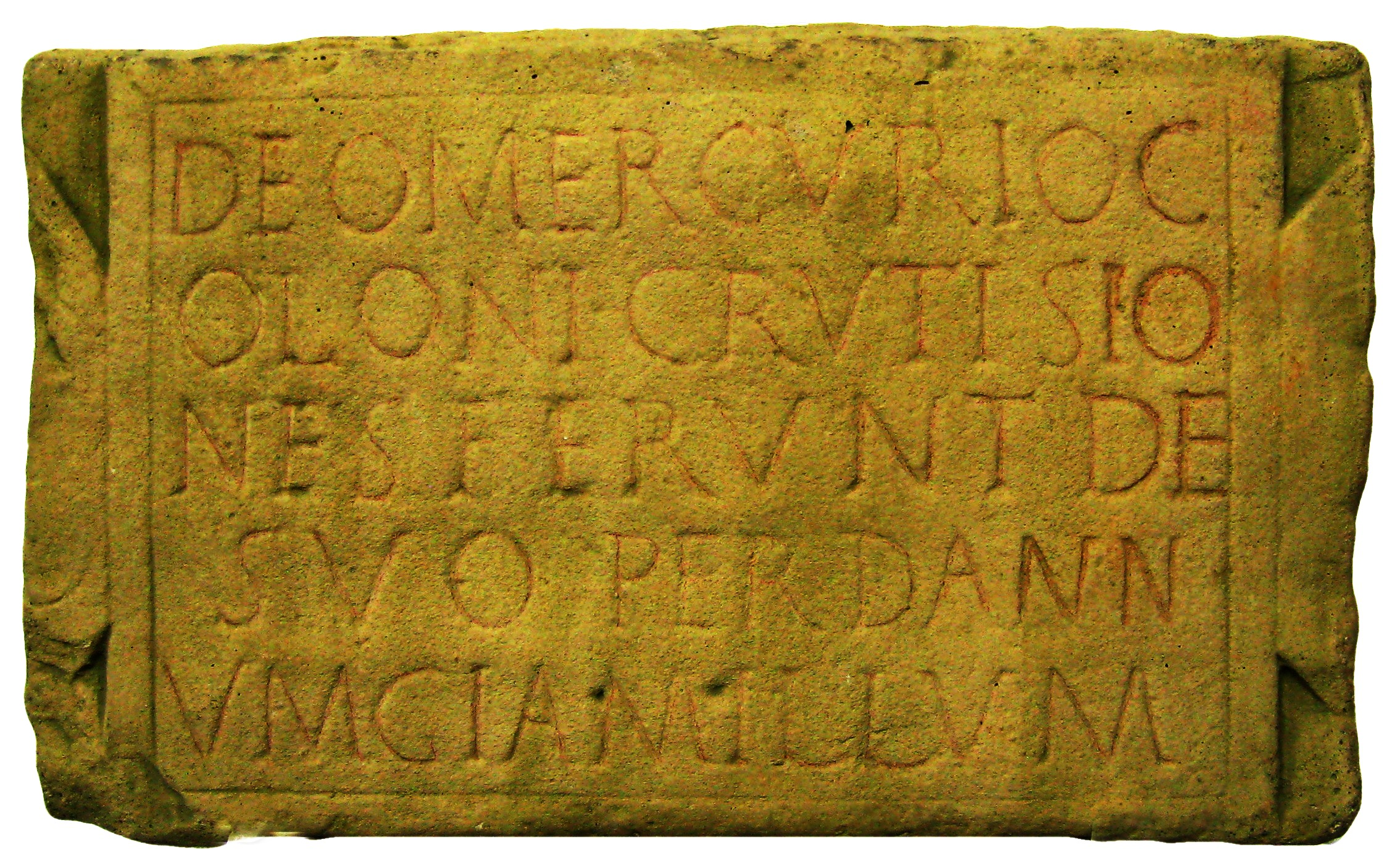
Mercury stone

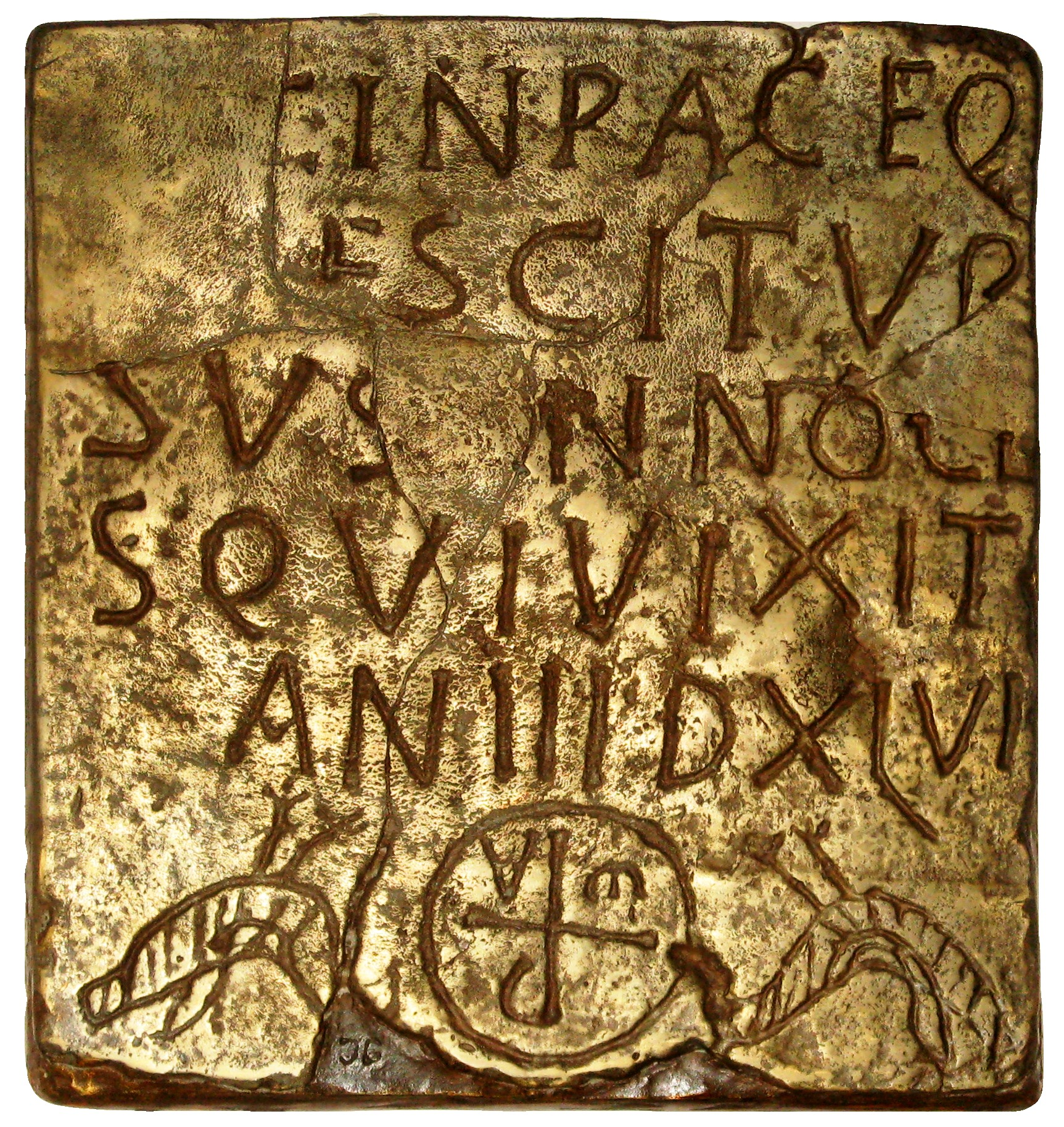
Ursus stone

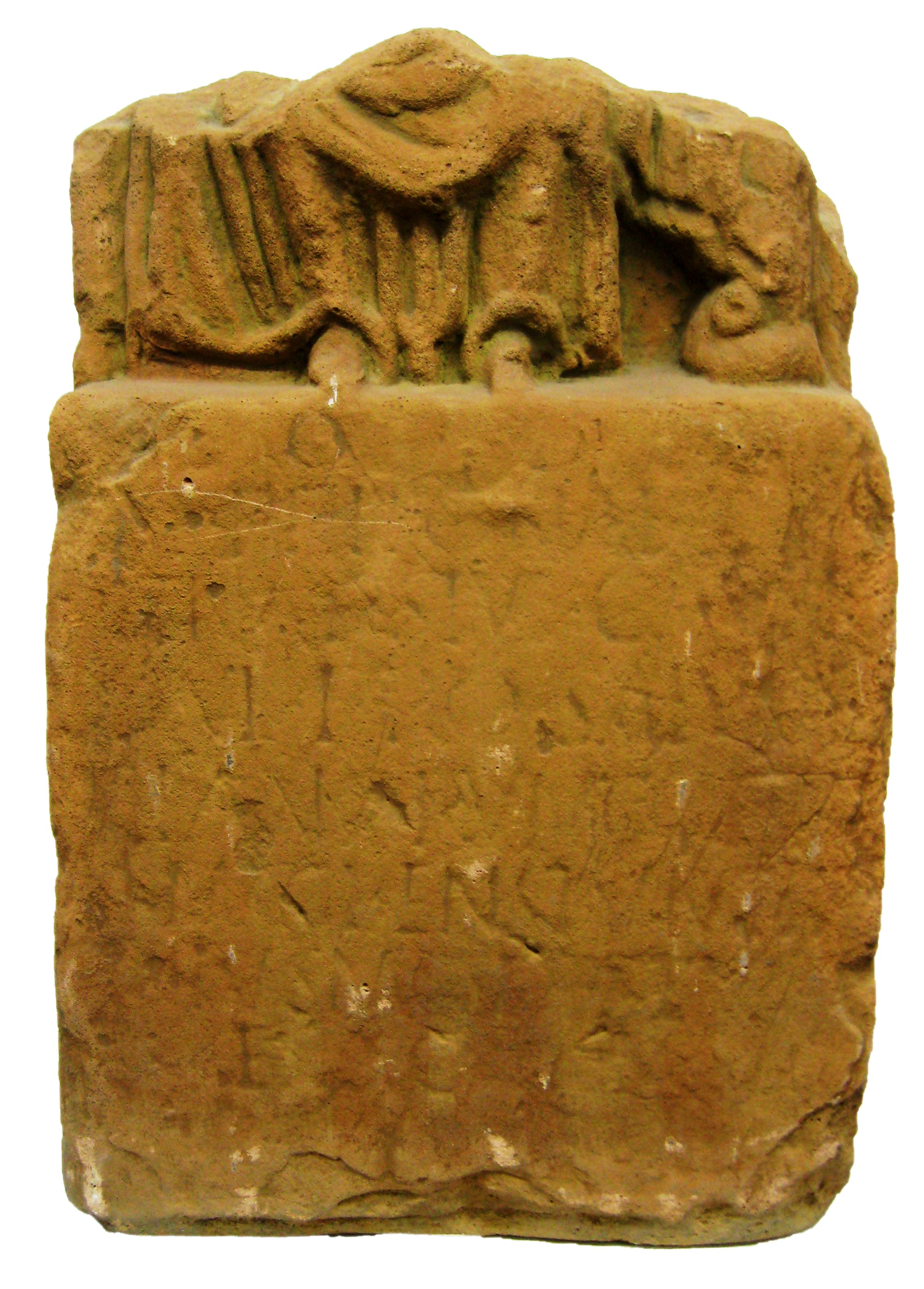
Contiomagus stone
