= Ritona =

Ancient Celtic goddess of fords

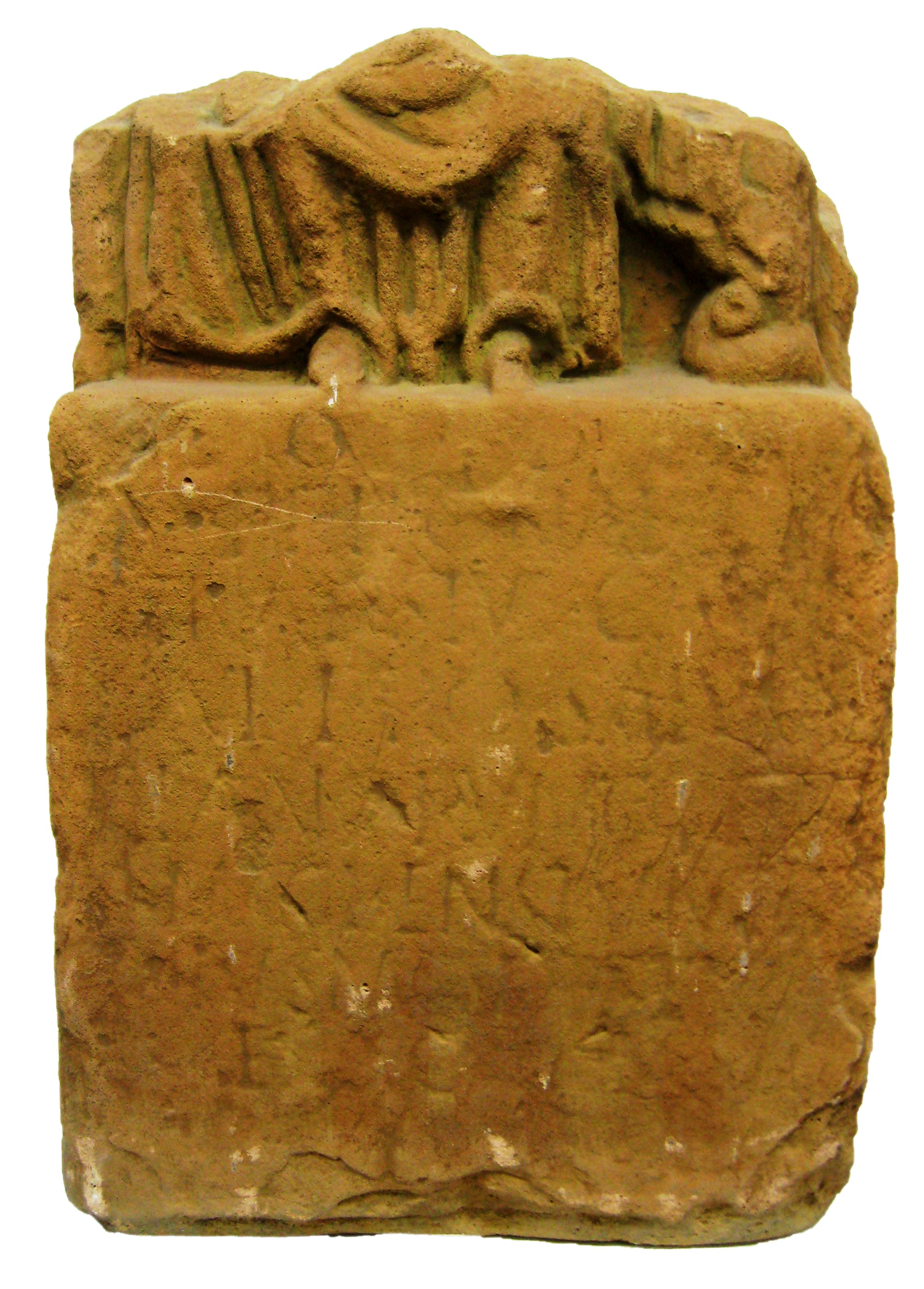
The Contiomagus stone from Pachten, recording the dedication to the goddess Pritona by the villagers of Contiomagus (AE 1959, 76)

Ritona (also Pritona; Gaulish for 'she of the ford') was an ancient Celtic goddess worshipped in Roman Gaul, above all among the Treveri of the Moselle. She is generally interpreted as a goddess of fords and river crossings. Her chief cult lay at Augusta Treverorum (modern Trier), where she had a temple in the Altbach valley sanctuary. She is also attested at the village of Contiomagus (modern Pachten, Saar) and in southern Gaul. Her name is built on the Gaulish word for 'ford' and occurs in two variant forms, Ritona and Pritona.

== Name ==
The goddess is named in Latin dedicatory inscriptions, most of them from the territory of the Treveri around Augusta Treverorum (modern Trier). Her name occurs in two forms, Ritona and Pritona, which scholars take to be variants of a single goddess. It appears also in the latinised shapes Ritonia and Pritonia. On one dedication from Trier the two forms stand together as Ritona Pritona.

The name is a latinised Gaulish formation built on the element ritu- ('ford'), with the divine-name ending -onā, and is understood as 'she of the ford'. The Gaulish word continues Proto-Celtic *ritu- ('ford'), from Proto-Indo-European *pr̥tus ('crossing, ford'), a derivative of the root *per- ('to cross'). The inherited initial p was lost, as regularly in Celtic, and the reflex ritu- survives in Welsh rhyd, Cornish rid and Breton rit ('ford'). Paul-Marie Duval and Lothar Schwinden take Pritona to be the earlier form, keeping the initial p- of the archaic name.

Gaulish also has a homonym ritu- meaning 'running' or 'racing', so a name formed on the stem could mean either 'she of the ford' or 'she of the course'. Xavier Delamarre contends that the sense 'ford' suits a goddess of the Treveri better, whose name is commonly interpreted a meaning 'ferrymen', from their ferrying across the Moselle.

The stem is common also in Gaulish personal names, such as Ritus, Rituca and Ritumara, and, in the sense 'ford', in place-names, among them Ritumagos ('ford-market', the ancient name of Radepont) and Anderitum ('great ford'). (Note: Xavier Delamarre would in general assign the sense 'ford' to place-names and 'running' to personal names, given the Gaulish practice of horse-racing, but does not regard the rule as holding in every case.)

== Cult ==
Ritona belongs to a group of Treveran deities of water and springs known chiefly from inscriptions, among them Icovellauna, who was honoured at Trier and at Metz. Her principal cult lay at Trier (Augusta Treverorum), where she had a temple in the Altbach valley (Altbachtal), a large sanctuary complex on the edge of the Roman city. The temple had an exedra with an adjacent kitchen (culina). John Scheid takes these to have been used to prepare sacrificial banquets, as at other temples of the sanctuary. An altar found nearby records the restoration of the temple and its altar after they had decayed with age.

Several of the dedications tie the cult to the public life of the Roman colony. They are made in honour of the Divine House (domus divina) and to the divine powers (numina) of the emperors. Scheid connects the exedra of Ritona's temple and the group that gathered there with the colonia and its authorities.

Outside Trier the goddess is attested at the Saar village of Contiomagus (Pachten), which lay at a river crossing where a road from Mainz met the road along the Saar valley. The villagers, the vicani Contiomagenses, dedicated to her the inscription with the deity taking the form Pritona. The temple precinct there, which dates probably to the 2nd century AD, included a theatre, presumably for performances of a religious character. The name is found also in southern Gaul, where a temple was dedicated to Ritona at Ucetia (modern Uzès) in Gallia Narbonensis.

== Interpretation ==
Ritona is generally understood as a goddess of fords and river crossings. Jean-Marie Pailler writes that in Gaul a river crossing was a place of ritual significance, where a ford could be consecrated and where the crossing called for religious precaution.

Lothar Schwinden treats her a mother goddess of the Treveri. A votive stone from Pachten shows a seated goddess, which he links to a local type of Treveran mother goddess accompanied by a dog. From the character of the goddess and the setting of her cult in the Altbachtal, he holds her worship to be rooted in indigenous tradition rather than a Roman-period creation.

John Scheid is more cautious. He notes that the term 'mother goddess' fits countless deities of the Mediterranean world, so it cannot on its own show that Ritona, or comparable figures like Aveta and Icovellauna, were pre-Roman. In his view the deities of the Altbachtal were not native cults that simply survived unchanged into Roman rule, but gods taken over and recast as public deities of the colony.

== Epigraphy ==
Ritona is named in six surviving inscriptions, most of them from the territory of the Treveri. The forms Ritona and Pritona, latinised also as Ritonia and Pritonia, both occur, and on one Trier dedication they stand together.

| Text | Find-spot | Divine name(s) | Translation | Reference | Comments |
|---|---|---|---|---|---|
| Dea(e) Ritona(e) Pritona(e) Arbusius C[...] | Trier (Augusta Treverorum), Belgica | Ritona Pritona | To the goddess Ritona Pritona, Arbusius C[...] (set this up). | AE 1928, 185 | From the Ritona temple in the Altbach valley sanctuary. The two forms of the name are used together. First half of the 3rd century. |
| [In honorem] d(omus) d(ivinae) [deae] Riton(a)e [aedem et] aram [orname]ntis et do[nis omn]ibus ve[tustat]e co(n)su[matis] restitu[erunt] Catirius [...]us et Cari[sius Me]morialis | Trier (Augusta Treverorum), Belgica | Ritona | In honour of the Divine House, Catirius [...]us and Carisius Memorialis restored for the goddess Ritona the temple and altar, with all their ornaments and gifts, worn away by age. | AE 1928, 186 | Records the restoration of the Ritona temple and its altar, belonging to the temple's second period. Schwinden reads the divine name as Ritoni(a)e. End of the 2nd or beginning of the 3rd century. |
| Numini[bus] Aug(ustorum) Rito[nae] sive ex iu[ssu ...] Rasius [...] lib[er]tus v(otum) s(olvit) l(ibens) m(erito) | Trier (Augusta Treverorum), Belgica | Ritona | To the divine powers of the emperors (and to) Ritona, or by the command of [...], Rasius [...], freedman, fulfilled his vow willingly and deservedly. | AE 1989, 547 | Set up by a freedman, together with the numina of the emperors. The reading after sive is very uncertain, some restoring a variant Pritonia. 2nd–3rd century. |
| [In] (h)o(norem) d(omus) [d(ivinae)] [d(e)a]e Pritonae [...] sive Ca[...]on(a)e pro salute vicanorum Contiomagensium Tertinius Modestus [...] | Contiomagus (Pachten), Belgica | Pritona | In honour of the Divine House, to the goddess Pritona [...], or Ca[...]ona, for the welfare of the villagers of Contiomagus, Tertinius Modestus (set this up). | AE 1959, 76 | The dedication of the vicani Contiomagenses. The goddess is named Pritona, with a further alternative name now lost. The stone carries a relief of a seated deity. |
| L(ucius) Gellius Sentronis f(ilius) Ritonae aede(m) v(otum) s(olvit) l(ibens) m(erito) | Ucetia (Montaren-et-Saint-Médiers), Gallia Narbonensis | Ritona | Lucius Gellius, son of Sentro, in fulfilment of his vow, willingly and deservedly (dedicated) a temple to Ritona. | CIL XII, 2927 | A temple (aedes) dedication, the only attestation from southern Gaul. Also published as ILS 4710. |
| Aug(usto) sacr(um) dea(e) Miner[vae] [...] Rit(onae?) April(is) Tami f(ilius) [...] | Crain, territory of the Aedui, Lugdunensis | Minerva, Ritona (?) | Sacred to the Augustus and to the goddess Minerva [...] Rit(ona?). Aprilis, son of Tamos (set this up). | CIL XIII, 2892 | In the territory of the Aedui. The expansion Rit(onae) is uncertain. If correct, the name is here coupled with Minerva. 2nd–3rd century. |
