= List of museums in North Brabant =

Below is a list of museums in the province of North Brabant ranked by city.

== Asten ==
- Nationaal Beiaardmuseum
- Natuurhistorisch Mus. De Peel

== Beers ==
- Nationaal Veeteeltmuseum

== Bergeijk ==
- AutomusA

== Bergen op Zoom ==
- Het Markiezenhof

== Best ==
- Klompenmuseum De Platijn, momenteel opgeheven
- Museum Bevrijdende Vleugels

== Boxtel ==
- Oertijdmuseum "De Groene Poort"
- Wasch- en Strijkmuseum

== Breda ==
- Breda's Museum
- Begijnhof Breda Museum
- Museum of the Image formerly Graphic Design Museum and De Beyerd
- Generaal Maczek Museum
- Bier Reclame Museum
- Heemkundig Museum Paulus van Daesdonck
- NAC Museum
- Stichting Princenhaags Museum

== Budel ==
- WS-19

== Cuijk ==
- Museum Ceuclum

== Deurne ==
- De Wieger
- Het Dinghuis

== Den Dungen ==
- 't Brabants Leven

== Dongen ==
- Dongha museum

== Eersel ==
- De Acht Zaligheden

== Eindhoven ==
- Van Abbemuseum
- Centrum Kunstlicht in de Kunst
- DAF Museum
- Historisch Openlucht Museum Eindhoven
- Museum Kempenland
- Philips Gloeilampenfabriekje anno 1891

== Esbeek ==
- Andreas Schotel museum

== Etten-Leur ==
- Drukkerijmuseum
- Streekmuseum Jan Uten Houte

== Fijnaart ==
- Museum en galerie Van Lien

== Geldrop ==
- Weverijmuseum Geldrop

== Gewande ==
- Archeologisch en Paleontologisch Museum Hertogsgemaal

== Handel ==
- 't Museumke

== Hank ==
- Bakeliet en Plastic Museum

== Heesch ==
- Poppenhuismuseum

== Heeswijk-Dinther ==
- Kasteel Heeswijk
- Meierijsche Museumboerderij
- Interart Beeldentuin & Galerie

== Helmond ==
- Gemeentemuseum Helmond
- Jan Visser Museum Helmond

== 's-Hertogenbosch ==
- Museum De Bouwloods
- Jheronimus Bosch Art Center
- Noordbrabants Museum
- Het Oeteldonks Gemintemuzejum
- Stedelijk Museum 's-Hertogenbosch
- Museum Slager

== Nuenen ==
- Vincentre

== Oosterhout ==
- Bakkerijmuseum
- Museum Oud-Oosterhout
- Speelgoedmuseum ‘op Stelten’
- Kaaiendonks Carnavalsmuseum

== Oss ==
- Museum Jan Cunen
- Stadsarchief Peperstraat
- K26
- Hooghuis stadion Art
- Hooghuis Zuid/West Art
- Torenbeklimming De Grote Kerk

== Overloon ==
- Nationaal Oorlogs- en Verzetsmuseum

== Ravenstein ==
- Museum voor vlakglas- en emaillekunst

== Sint-Oedenrode ==
- Smederijmuseum
- Jukeboxmuseum
- Museum Sint-Paulusgasthuis

== Someren ==
- Museum voor Vluchtsimulatie

== Tilburg ==
- Museum De Pont
- Museum Scryption
- Natuurmuseum Brabant
- TextielMuseum
- Museum voor Naastenliefde
- Museumbrouwerij de Roos Hilvarenbeek
- Museum de Dorpsdokter Hilvarenbeek
- Likeur- en frisdrankmusem Hilvarenbeek
- Boekorgelmuseum Hilvarenbeek
- Landbouwmuseum Hilvarenbeek

== Uden ==
- Museum voor Religieuze Kunst

== Valkenswaard ==
- Nederlands Steendrukmuseum

== Veghel ==
- Museum SIEMei (Stichting Industrieel Erfgoed Meierij)

== Vught ==
- Geniemuseum
- Nationaal Monument Kamp Vught (WW-II concentration camp)
- Vughts Historisch Museum

== Waalwijk ==
- Nederlands Leder en Schoenen Museum
