= North Brabant =

Province of the Netherlands

Coordinates: 51°40′N 5°00′E

North Brabant Noord-Brabant (Dutch)
- Province
- Province of North Brabant; Provincie Noord-Brabant (Dutch)
- Flag Coat of arms Brandmark
- Anthem: Het Lied van Hertog Jan (The Song of Duke John)
- Location of North Brabant in the Netherlands

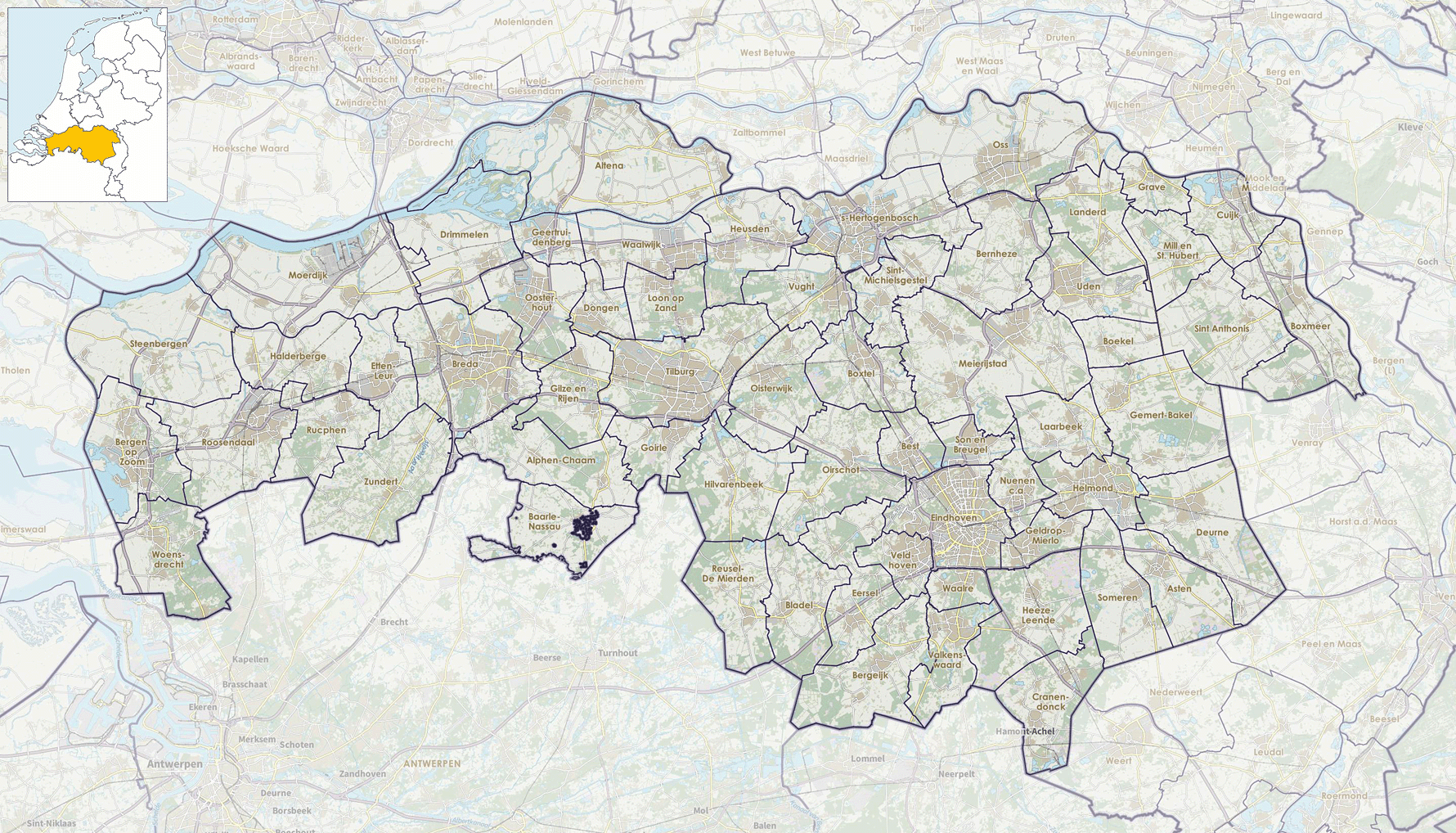
- Topography map of North Brabant
- Country: Netherlands
- Inclusion: 1815
- Capital: 's-Hertogenbosch
- Largest city: Eindhoven

Government
  - King's Commissioner: Ina Adema (VVD)
  - Council: States of North Brabant

Area (2023)
  - Total: 5,082 km^{2} (1,962 sq mi)
  - Land: 4,902 km^{2} (1,893 sq mi)
  - Water: 181 km^{2} (70 sq mi)
  - Rank: 3rd

Population (1 January 2023)
  - Total: 2,626,210
  - Rank: 3rd
  - Density: 536/km^{2} (1,390/sq mi)
  - Rank: 4th

GDP
  - Total: €171.621 billion (2024)
  - Per capita: €64,422 (2024)
- ISO 3166 code: NL-NB
- Religion (2015): Catholic 48% Protestant 6% Muslim 4%
- HDI (2021): 0.941 very high · 3rd of 12
- Website: www.brabant.nl

North Brabant (Dutch: Noord-Brabant [ˌnoːrt ˈbraːbɑnt]; Brabantian: Broabant [ˈbrɑːban]), also unofficially called Brabant or Dutch Brabant, is a province in the south of the Netherlands. It borders the provinces of South Holland and Gelderland to the north, Limburg to the east, Zeeland to the west, and Belgium's provinces of Antwerp and Limburg to the south. The northern border follows the Meuse westward to its mouth in the Hollands Diep strait, part of the Rhine–Meuse–Scheldt delta.

North Brabant had a population of about 2,626,000 as of January 2023. Major cities in North Brabant are Eindhoven (pop. 231,642), Tilburg (pop. 217,259), Breda (pop. 183,873), its provincial capital 's-Hertogenbosch (pop. 154,205), and Helmond (pop. 94,967). The province has the third-largest economy of all Dutch provinces, after North Holland and South Holland. The agricultural and horticultural sectors are traditionally strong, as is forestry.

Rooted in the Duchy of Brabant, the province still possesses a recognizable character today. This is evident in the Brabant dialects and traditions such as Carnival. Catholicism, which was a dominant social force for centuries, has had a significant influence on the development of North Brabant's distinct identity. Both the province and Limburg remained in the Netherlands following the Belgian Revolution when it was decided to adopt the old pre-1790s borders of the Dutch Republic.

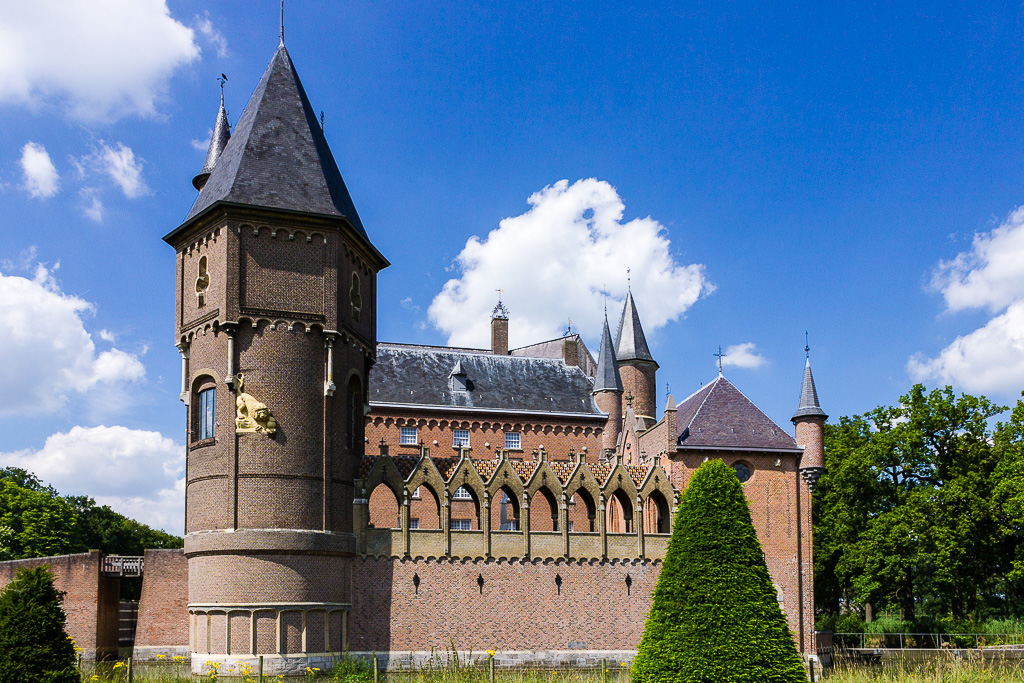
Castle Heeswijk

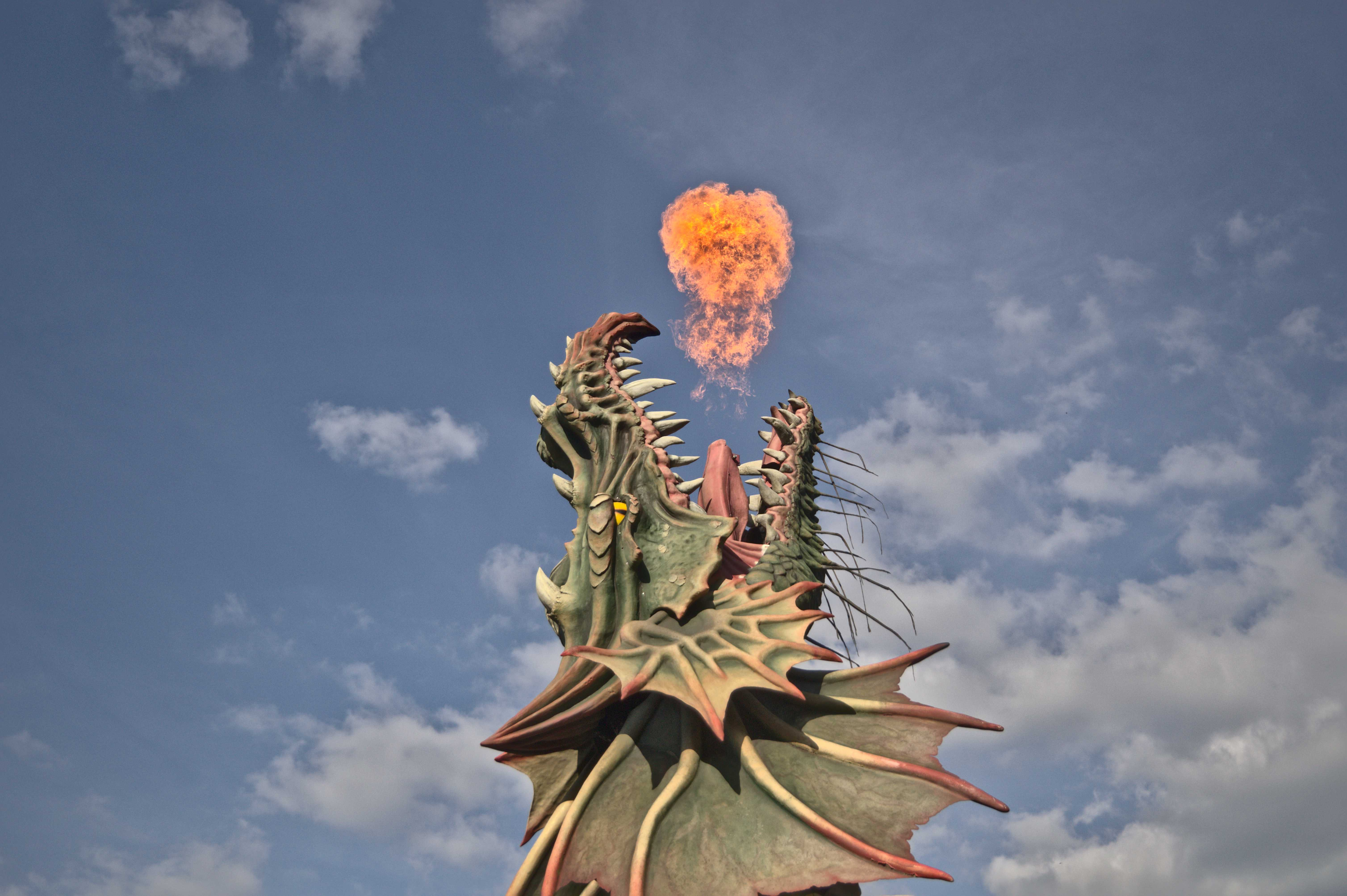
Themepark Efteling - World of Wonders

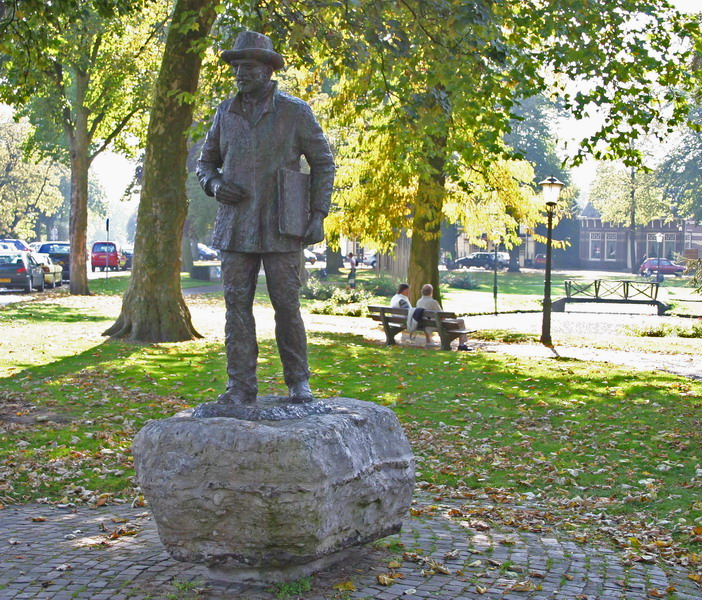
Van Gogh statue, Nuenen. Vincent van Gogh was born in Zundert. He lived and studied in various Brabant cities, including Zundert, Tilburg and Nuenen. Many buildings that Van Gogh painted have been designated 'Van Gogh Monuments'.

== History ==
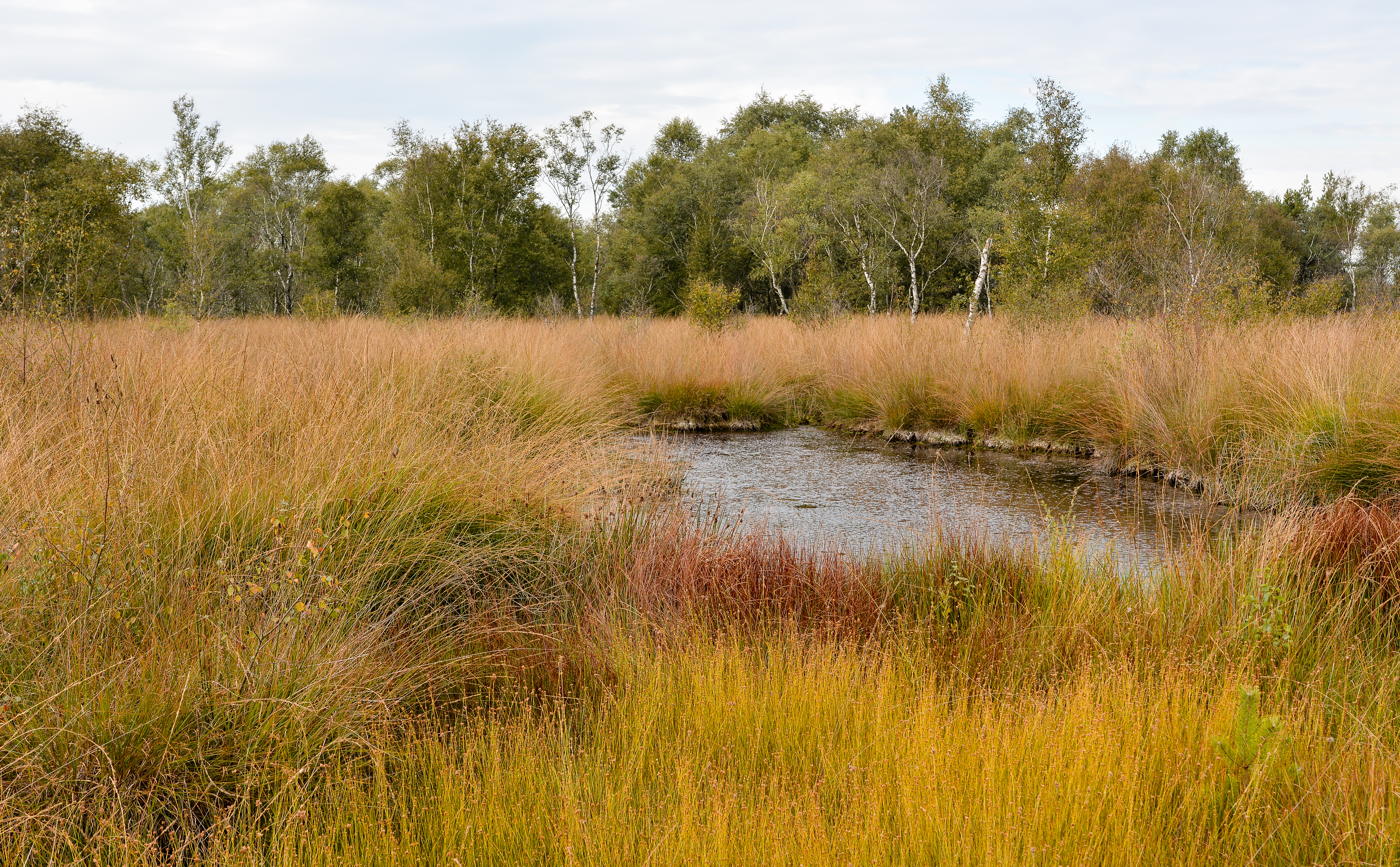
De Groote Peel National Park

The Duchy of Brabant was a state of the Holy Roman Empire established in 1183 or 1190. It developed from the Landgraviate of Brabant and formed the heart of the historic Low Countries, part of the Burgundian Netherlands from 1430 and of the Habsburg Netherlands from 1482, until it was split up after the Dutch revolt. After the War of Independence, Catholics in the Southern Netherlands were systematically and officially discriminated against by the Northern Protestant government until the second half of the 19th century, which had a major influence on the economic and cultural development of the southern part of the Netherlands.

Present-day North Brabant (Staats-Brabant) was adjudicated to the Generality Lands of the Dutch Republic according to the 1648 Peace of Westphalia, while the reduced duchy remained in existence with the Southern Netherlands until it was conquered by French Revolutionary forces in 1794.

Until the 17th century, the area that now makes up the province of North Brabant was mostly part of the Duchy of Brabant, of which the southern part is now in Belgium. During the 14th and 15th centuries, the area experienced a golden age—especially the now-Belgian cities of Brussels, Mechelen, Leuven and Antwerp, and the Dutch cities of Breda, Bergen op Zoom and 's-Hertogenbosch.

After the Union of Utrecht was signed in 1579, Brabant became a battlefield between the Protestant Dutch Republic and Catholic Spain, which occupied the southern Netherlands. As a result of the Peace of Westphalia, the northern part of Brabant became part of the Netherlands as the territory of Staats-Brabant (Statal Brabant) under federal rule, in contrast to the founding provinces of the Dutch Republic, which were self-governing.

Attempts to introduce Protestantism into the region were largely unsuccessful; North Brabant remained strongly Catholic. For over a century, North Brabant served mainly as a military buffer zone. In 1796, when the confederate Dutch Republic became the unitary Batavian Republic, Staats-Brabant became a province as Bataafs Brabant. This status ended with the reorganisation by the invading French, and the area was united into the département of Deux-Nèthes (present province of Antwerp).

In 1815, Belgium and the Netherlands were united in the United Kingdom of the Netherlands, and the province of North Brabant was established and so named to distinguish it from Central Brabant and South Brabant in present-day Belgium, which seceded from the Kingdom in 1830. This boundary between the Netherlands and Belgium is special in that it does not form a contiguous line, but leaves a handful of tiny enclaves (and enclaves inside enclaves) on both sides of the border. In fact, the Dutch government generally used the pre-Napoleonic borders in 1815 to divide its provinces, in hommage to the principle of Restoration. A few of these irregularities were corrected (Luyksgestel was exchanged for Lommel, Huijbergen became totally Dutch), but some remain, notably Baarle-Hertog (Belgian) and Baarle-Nassau (Dutch).

When the present province was instituted, its territory was expanded with a part of the province of Holland and the former territory of Ravenstein, which had previously belonged to the Duchy of Cleves, as well as several small, formerly autonomous entities.

In World War II the area was liberated by the allies during Operation Pheasant between October 20 to November 4, 1944.

The period from 1900 until the late 1960s is called Het Rijke Roomse Leven (translated as 'the rich Roman life', with 'Roman' meaning 'Roman Catholic'), an era of strong religious belief. Het Rijke Roomse Leven came about as result of the emancipatory drive of the province's disadvantaged Catholic population and was supported by a Roman Catholic pillar, which was directed by the clergy, and not only encompassed churches, but also Roman Catholic schools and hospitals, which were run by nuns and friars. In those days every village in North Brabant had a convent from which the nuns operated. Politically, the province was dominated by Catholic parties: the Roman Catholic State Party and its post-war successor, the Catholic People's Party, which often held around 75% of the vote.

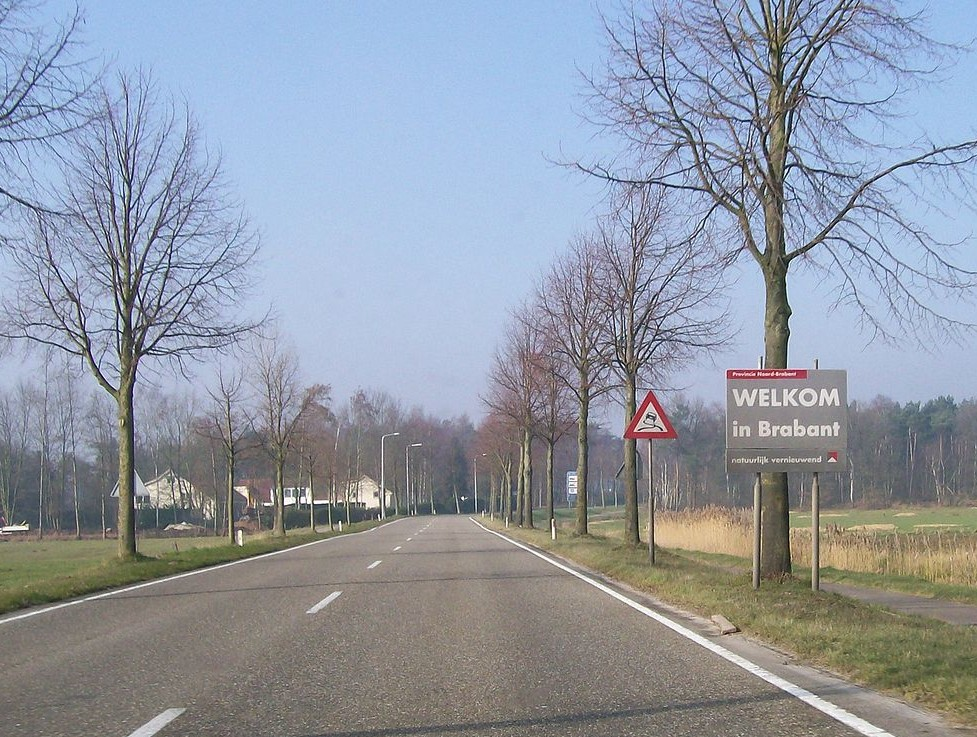
A sign saying, "Welcome to Brabant". North Brabant is often just referred to as "Brabant".

In the 1960s secularisation and the actual emancipation of the Catholic population brought about the gradual dissolution of the Catholic pillar, as church attendance decreased in North Brabant as elsewhere in Western Europe. The influence of Het Rijke Roomse Leven (The Rich Roman [Catholic] Life) remains in the form of education where some schools are still Roman Catholic (today run by professional teachers and not by nuns) and in North Brabant's culture, politics, mentality and customs, such as carnival.

The interpretation of the Roman Catholic identity in North Brabant has shifted during the last 65 years from religious to cultural, but the province still has a distinct Catholic atmosphere when compared to the provinces north of the major rivers. A cultural divide is still found between the "Catholic" south and the "Protestant" north, but with a total of 1.5 million people and 20% of the industrial production in the Netherlands the southern "Catholic" area BrabantStad has become one of the major economically important, metropolitan regions of the Netherlands. As of 2010, Catholics were no longer a majority of the population in the province of North Brabant. Only 1–2% of the total population of the Catholic area attend mass, and these churchgoers consist mostly of people over 65 years old.

== Geography ==
With a population density of 501/km^{2}, North Brabant is above average urbanized. The urbanization is at the center of the province at largest, where the 'kite' (the Brabantse Stedenrij Breda, Tilburg, Eindhoven and 's-Hertogenbosch) is located, the rest of the province has a more rural character. The province has preserved some of its scenic nature well. National parks are found at the Loonse and Drunen Dunes, De Biesbosch and De De Groote Peel, on the marshes of the Meierij at Oisterwijk and Boxtel (within an area called Het Groene Woud), the border park Zoom-Kalmthoutse Heide, and in the forested area around Breda. Also, south of Eindhoven named De Kempen is an area with farmlands and forests. In Heeze, also south of Eindhoven, are the heath areas the Groote Heide (333 ha) and Strabrechtse Heath (1500 ha) located. The Strabrechtse Heide holds also the largest fen of the Netherlands. The Beuven (Beu fen) measures 85 hectares.

Like most of the Netherlands, North Brabant is mostly flat but nearly every part of North Brabant is above sea level; therefore, there are not as many canals as in the lower parts of The Netherlands. Although most of the population lives in urban areas, the province is scattered with villages around which most of the land is cultivated.

National Parks in North Brabant are:

- De Biesbosch; National Park; North Brabant / South Holland; 7.100 ha; 1994
- De Zoom-Kalmthoutse Heide; Cross-Border Park; North Brabant / Antwerp (Belgium); 3.750 ha; 2001
- De Loonse en Drunense Duinen; National Park; North Brabant; 3.400 ha; 2002
- De Grote Peel; National Park; North Brabant / Limburg; 1.340 ha; 1993

=== De Biesbosch ===
The Biesbosch (from bies, "rushes", and bosch, "woodland") is an area southeast of Dordrecht formed when the dike on the Meuse burst and the St. Elizabeth's floods on 19 November 1421 engulfed great tracts of land in the southwestern Netherlands and altered the geography of the whole area, inundating over 40,000 hectares (100,000 acres) of land. More than four-fifths of the flooded land has been reclaimed since the 18th century. An area of 6,000 hectares (15,000 acres) was left as it was, and now forms the Biesbosch nature reserve and bird sanctuary. Until the end of the 1960s the Biesbosch was directly connected with the sea and subject to changing tide levels. As a result, it developed a flora which tolerated brackish water and was the home of numerous waterfowl. Since the damming of the Haringvliet there is no variation in water level, and both flora and fauna have adapted to the new environment. The Biesbosch is crisscrossed by a network of footpaths and bike paths and by rivers and streams which offer facilities for water sports (sailing, surfing). In spite of the large numbers of visitors the natural environment has remained largely unspoiled. The Biesbosch nature reserve can be reached by car only from the east (preferably via Werkendam). The southwest part of the area, with its three large reservoirs of drinking water, is closed to road traffic. The Biesbosch can also be reached by boat from Drimmelen, Geertruidenberg or Lage Zwaluwe.

=== De Kempen ===
The historical region of Kempen occupies the southern part of the province of Noord-Brabant and extends south of Eindhoven far into northern Belgium. To the east it reaches as far as the Meuse valley. The surface topography of De Kempen is very uniform. Most of it lies between 5 m (15 ft) and 35 m (115 ft) above sea level. The basement rocks are Cretaceous and Tertiary sediments, which are overlaid by Ice Age gravels and sands carried here by rivers of melt-water from the retreating glaciers. It is a typical area of sandy heathland. The infertile soil is suitable only for undemanding crops such as rye, oats, potatoes and fodder plants; this limits the profitability of agriculture. Until a few decades ago Kempen was a region of heathland and sand drifts with a sparse growth of pines, a few scattered villages subsisting on the poor soil and some small towns; and this is still the pattern in much of the region. In recent years, however, the rapid advance of industry has brought about profound changes in this agricultural region. The origins of this industrial development go back 70–100 years. The main concentrations of industry are along the southern frontier of the Netherlands, e.g., at Eindhoven, Helmond, Tilburg, Breda, 's-Hertogenbosch.

=== De Peel ===
In the east of Noord-Brabant, near the Limburgish border, is the Peel area, an expanse of moorland extending from Eindhoven to Venlo, on the border with Limburg. Southeast of Asten is a nature reserve (1,300 hectares (3,250 acres); visitor center at Ospeldijk) which has escaped destruction by peat cutting. Mostly boggy, it will appeal to nature lovers with its interesting flora and fauna. Apart from this small area almost the whole of the Peel has been brought into cultivation.

=== Rivers and deltas ===
The province is bordered by the river Meuse in the north. Its delta flows through De Biesbosch area, a national park.

=== Municipalities ===
North Brabant has been divided into 56 municipalities since 2022. Traditionally, almost every town was a separate municipality, but their number was reduced greatly in the 1990s by incorporating smaller towns into neighbouring cities or by other mergers. The municipalities in North Brabant are:

- West North Brabant COROP group
  - Bergen op Zoom
  - Breda
  - Drimmelen
  - Etten-Leur
  - Geertruidenberg
  - Halderberge
  - Moerdijk
  - Oosterhout
  - Roosendaal
  - Rucphen
  - Steenbergen
  - Woensdrecht
  - Zundert
- Mid North Brabant COROP group
  - Alphen-Chaam
  - Altena
  - Baarle-Nassau
  - Dongen
  - Gilze en Rijen
  - Goirle
  - Hilvarenbeek
  - Loon op Zand
  - Oisterwijk
  - Tilburg
  - Waalwijk
- North East North Brabant COROP group
  - Bernheze
  - Boekel
  - Boxtel
  - 's-Hertogenbosch
  - Heusden
  - Land van Cuijk
  - Maashorst
  - Meierijstad
  - Oss
  - Sint-Michielsgestel
  - Vught
- South East Brabant COROP group
  - Asten
  - Bergeijk
  - Best
  - Bladel
  - Cranendonck
  - Deurne
  - Eersel
  - Eindhoven
  - Geldrop-Mierlo
  - Gemert-Bakel
  - Heeze-Leende
  - Helmond
  - Laarbeek
  - Nuenen, Gerwen en Nederwetten
  - Oirschot
  - Reusel-De Mierden
  - Someren
  - Son en Breugel
  - Valkenswaard
  - Veldhoven
  - Waalre

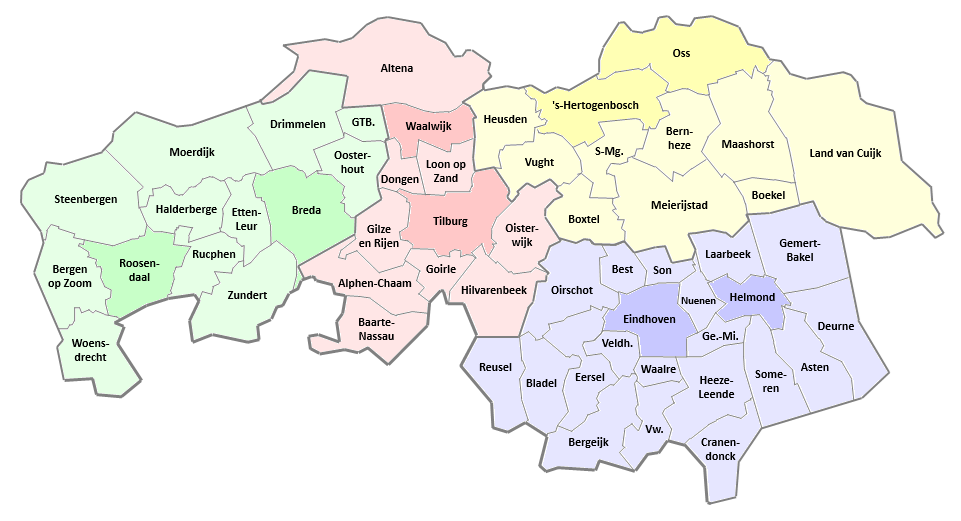
COROPs in North Brabrant

==== Municipal reclassifications ====
The following municipal reclassifications took place in the 21st century:

On 1 January 2003 the municipality of Ravenstein merged into the existing municipality of Oss.
On 1 January 2004 the municipalities of Geldrop and Mierlo merged into a new municipality called Geldrop-Mierlo.
On 1 January 2011 the municipality of Lith merged into the existing municipality of Oss.
On 1 January 2015 the municipality of Maasdonk merged into the existing municipalities of 's-Hertogenbosch and Oss.
On 1 January 2017 the municipalities of Veghel, Schijndel, and Sint-Oedenrode merged into a new municipality called Meierijstad, creating the largest municipality of the province of North Brabant in terms of land area.
On 1 January 2019 the municipalities of Aalburg, Werkendam, and Woudrichem merged into a new municipality called Altena, an even larger municipality in terms of land area.
On 1 January 2021 the municipality of Haaren merged into the existing municipalities of Boxtel, Oisterwijk, Tilburg, and Vught.
On 1 January 2022 the municipalities of Landerd and Uden merged into the new municipality of Maashorst, and the municipalities of Boxmeer, Cuijk, Grave, Mill en Sint Hubert, and Sint Anthonis merged into the new municipality of Land van Cuijk.

== Economy ==
The gross domestic product (GDP) of the province was 116.1 billion € in 2018, accounting for 15.0% of the Netherlands economic output. GDP per capita adjusted for purchasing power was €39,900 or 132% of the EU27 average in the same year.

Employment is found in the agricultural, industrial and service sectors, with agricultural and food processing companies such as Agrifirm, Bavaria, FrieslandCampina, Mars Incorporated, Nutreco, Royal Canin all having large production sites or their headquarters located in the province. The main agricultural products are sweetcorn, wheat and sugar beet, while cows and pigs are held as livestock.

An important economical activity is electronics industry, which developed as a spin-off from Philips. Several companies originated from Philips, such as Signify (formerly Philips Lighting), NXP (producer of semiconductors), and the world's largest supplier of photolithography systems, ASML. There are eight 'innovation campusses' in North Brabant, including the High Tech Campus Eindhoven and BrainPort, which comprises more than 5000 tech and IT companies. In 2017, Brabantian companies applied for 3655 patents, earning a spot in the regional top five in Europe. The chip company Axelera AI is also headquartered in Eindhoven.

Other important industries are automobile production (e.g. General Motors in Breda, Tesla in Tilburg) and DAF in Eindhoven, textile and shoes.

In the 20th century, tourism has become an important sector for North Brabant. A tourist attraction is theme park Efteling in Kaatsheuvel, the largest of the Benelux.

Safaripark Beekse Bergen is a safari park located between Tilburg and Hilvarenbeek. In terms of area, it is the largest safari park in the Benelux. More than 150 animal species are kept, ranging from small mammals to large birds. It is best known for its diversity. There are several options for exploring the park, such as on foot, by boat, by bus or by personal car.

BrabantStad is a partnership between the municipalities of Breda, Eindhoven, Helmond, 's-Hertogenbosch and Tilburg and the province of North Brabant. According to national rules, BrabantStad is defined as the area of Eindhoven, 's-Hertogenbosch and Tilburg.

== Language ==
A Brabantian speaker, recorded in Slovakia.

Brabantian is not a minority language in the Netherlands. It can be divided in two main dialects: East Brabantian and West Brabantian. Along with the Hollandic dialects it is one of the two most spoken versions of Dutch. Brabantian has, as compared to the other main Dutch dialects, had a big influence on the development of Standard Dutch. This is because Brabant was the dominant region in the Netherlands when the standardization of Dutch started in the 16th century. The first major formation of standard Dutch also took place in Antwerp, where a Brabantian dialect is spoken. The default language having been developed around this time, it therefore had mainly Brabantian influences. The early modern Dutch written language was initially influenced primarily by Brabantian, with strong influence from Hollandic emerging after the 16th century. Since the Brabantian dialect has developed faster than 16th- and 17th-century Dutch, it has become more diverse than modern Standard Dutch but is still quite similar and very understandable. About one third of the Dutch-speaking population lives in the Brabantian dialect zone. Both in Brabantian cities such as Breda and Eindhoven and in rural areas many people still speak the original dialect or colloquial Dutch with a typical "southern" tongue. Tilburg and 's-Hertogenbosch have a large number of people speaking the Brabantian dialect.

== Culture ==
There are many museums, especially in the larger cities, including the North Brabant Museum in 's-Hertogenbosch, the Van Abbemuseum in Eindhoven, the Museum of the Image in Breda, and the Noordbrabants Natuurmuseum in Tilburg. A few towns have large theatres like the Chassé Theater in Breda and the Eindhoven Park Theatre. Large music venues such as the 013 in Tilburg, one of the largest music venues in the Netherlands, and the Effenaar in Eindhoven offer concerts by major artists. Smaller venues such as Mezz Breda, W2 Concert in 's-Hertogenbosch and the smaller halls of the 013 and the Effenaar offer concerts by emerging artists and established performers in a more intimate setting.

=== Events ===
Some yearly cultural events in North Brabant are:

- Carnaval, (February)
- Koningsdag, national day (27 April)
- Dutch Design Week in Eindhoven, international school festival (October)
- GLOW Festival Eindhoven in Eindhoven, (November)
- STRP Festival, art & technology festival in Eindhoven (March)
- Breda Jazz Festival in Breda (May / June)
- Redhead Day (Roodharigendag) in Breda (first weekend of September)
- Incubate in Tilburg (September)
- Roadburn Festival in Tilburg (April)
- Tilburgse Kermis in Tilburg since 1567 (July)
- Equestrian event Indoor Brabant, (Dressage and Show jumping) in 's-Hertogenbosch (March)
- International Vocal Competition 's-Hertogenbosch (September)
- Jazz in Duketown in 's-Hertogenbosch (June)
- Art & Antiques Fair 's-Hertogenbosch (April)
- Erasmusfestival (Even years) in 's-Hertogenbosch (Fall)
- Jazz in Catstown in Helmond (June)
- Kasteeltuinconcerten (Castle Garden Concerts) in Helmond (July, August)
- Extrema Outdoor in Best (July)
- Paaspop in Schijndel (April)
- Mosh meeting in Roosendaal (March)
- Monsters of Mariaheide in Veghel (February)

=== Museums ===
List of museums in North Brabant

Museums of the main cities:

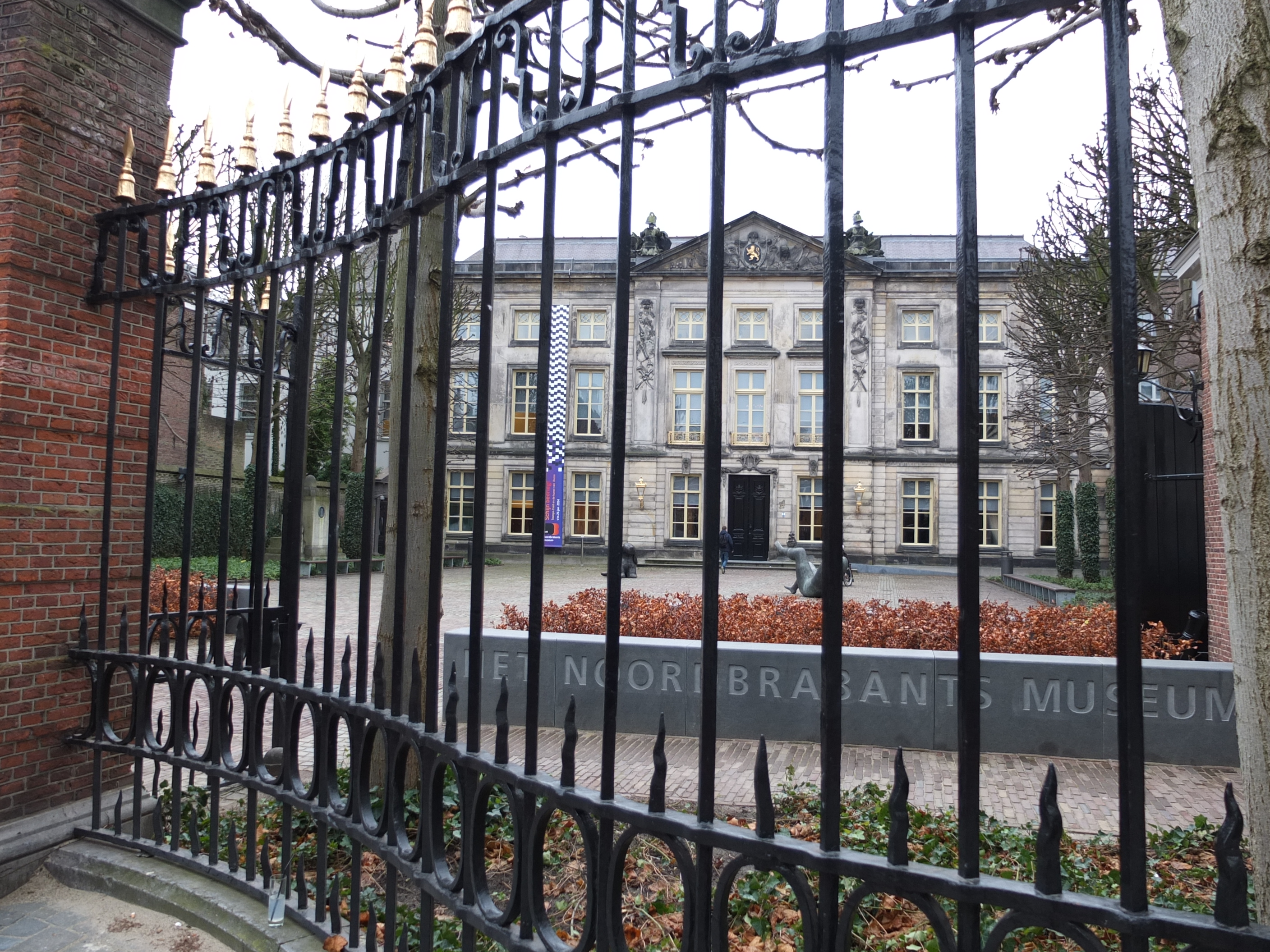
The Museum Quarter in 's-Hertogenbosch is a collective for the Design Museum and NoordBrabants Museum

's-Hertogenbosch

- Museum Quarter
  - Noordbrabants Museum (History and art)
  - Design Museum Den Bosch
- Southern waterline locations
  - Kruithuis (Fortress Museum)
  - Bastionder (information center fortifications)
  - Bolwerk St. Jan (information center Stronghold and Citygate)
  - Fort Orthen, Fort Isabella and the Citadel (Historic Fortresses)
  - Maurick Castle
- Zwanenbroedershuis (Historical Brotherhood Museum)
- Huize de Loet (Brabantian Mansion Museum)
- Sint-Jansmuseum (Historical and Architectural Museum)
- Het Oeteldonks Gemintemuzejum (carnaval museum)
- Jheronimus Bosch Art Center
- Museum Slager (Museum in honor of the Artist Family)
- Museum Hertogsgemaal (Archaeological and Paleontological Museum)
- Museum Gemaal Caners (Watermanagement Museum)
- Herzogenbusch/Nationaal Monument Kamp Vught WW-II concentration camp (actually in Vught)
- Geniemuseum (actually in Vught)
- Vughts Museum (actually in Vught)

Eindhoven

- There are two museums dedicated to the major topics of the city's industrial heritage: the DAF Museum has a collection of DAF cars, trucks and buses, and the Philips Museum documents the company history of electronics giant Philips and incorporates a 1891 lightbulb workshop.
- The Designhuis, a public podium and interaction area for modern design and innovation in the former district court house.
- The Eindhoven Museum, an archaeological open-air museum which focuses on the region's Iron Age and Middle Ages. It merged in 2011 with Museum Kempenland which was a regional museum, which documents the history of the Kempenland region in objects, documents, paint and educational activities. Museum Kempenland's old location, the Steentjeskerk, is closed.
- Inkijkmuseum ("Look-In museum"; housed in an old linen factory in the Dommelstraat) is a small but special museum: it offers ever-changing exhibits, which are to be viewed through the building's windows.
- The Van Abbemuseum has a collection of modern and contemporary art, including works by Picasso, Kandinsky, Mondriaan, and Chagall.
- Wings of Liberation Museum / Bevrijdende Vleugels documents the liberation of the southern Netherlands

Breda

- Stedelijk Museum Breda, resulting from a 2017 merger of the Breda's Museum and the MOTI (Museum of the Image)
- Begijnhof Breda Museum
- General Maczek Museum
- Beer Commercial Museum
- NAC Museum (football)
- Local History Museum / Heemkunde Museum Paulus van Daesdonck
- Museum Oorlog & Vrede (War and Peace Museum)
- Stichting Princenhaags Museum

Tilburg

- Museum of Modern Art – De Pont Foundation
- Nature museum Brabant
- Textile Museum
- Museum of Charity
- Museum brewery de Roos Hilvarenbeek
- Museum the Town doctor Hilvarenbeek
- Liquor and soda museum Hilvarenbeek
- Boekorgelmuseum Hilvarenbeek
- Agricultural museum Hilvarenbeek

=== Cuisine ===
The Southern Dutch cuisine constitutes the cuisine of the Dutch provinces of North Brabant and Limburg and the Flemish Region in Belgium. It is renowned for its many rich pastries, soups, stews, and vegetable dishes and is often called "Burgundian", which is a Dutch idiom invoking the rich Burgundian court which ruled the Low Countries in the Middle Ages and was renowned for its splendor and great feasts.

It is the only Dutch culinary region which developed an haute cuisine, as it is influenced by both German cuisine and French cuisine, and it forms the base of most traditional Dutch restaurants including typical main courses such as Biefstuk, Varkenshaas, or Ossenhaas, which are premium cuts of meat, generally pork or beef, accompanied by various sauces and potatoes which have been double fried in the traditional Dutch (or Belgian) manner.

Stews, such as hachee, a stew of onions, beef and a thick gravy, contain a lot of flavour and require hours to prepare. Vegetable soups are made from richly flavored stock or bouillon and typically contain small meatballs alongside a variety of different vegetables. Asparagus and witlo(o)f are highly prized and traditionally eaten with cheese and/or ham.

Pastries are abundant, often with rich fillings of cream, custard or fruits. Cakes, such as the Moorkop and Bossche Bol from Brabant, are typical pastries. There are also savory pastries, especially the popular worstenbroodje (a roll with a sausage of ground beef).

The traditional alcoholic beverage of the region is beer. There are many local brands, ranging from Trappist to Kriek. Beer, like wine in French cuisine, is also used in cooking, often in stews.

=== Sports ===
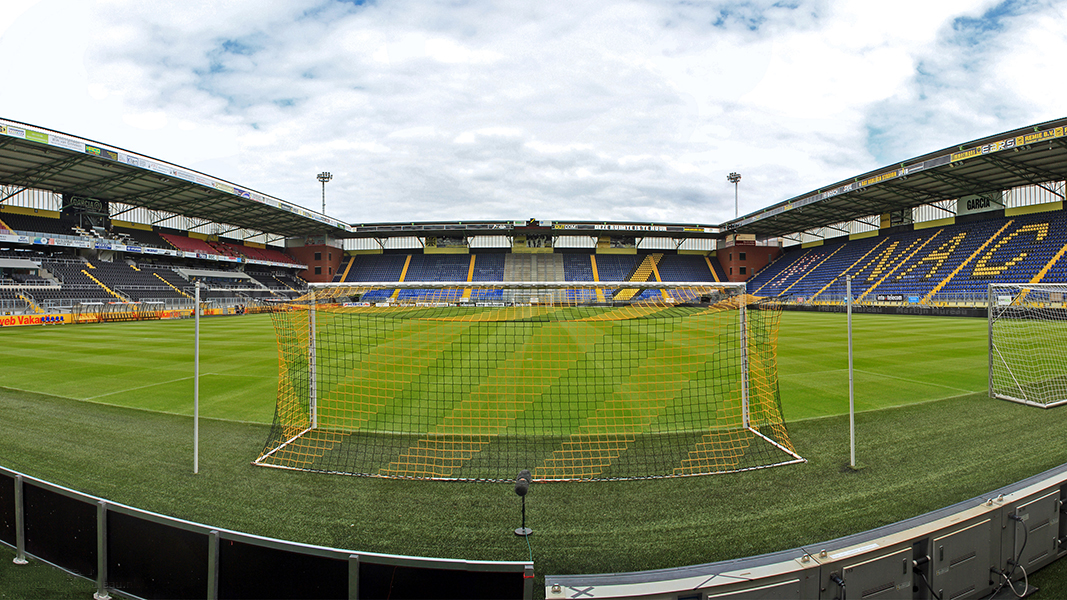
Rat Verlegh Stadium of NAC Breda

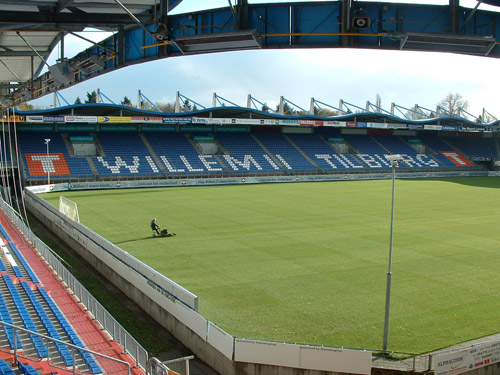
King Willem II Stadium of Willem II

==== Association football ====
North Brabant is home to 8 professional football clubs, more than any other province in the Netherlands. Four clubs (PSV, NAC, Willem II and RKC Waalwijk) play in the Eredivisie, the highest professional football league in the Netherlands. Four clubs (Helmond Sport, FC Den Bosch, FC Eindhoven and TOP Oss) play in the Eerste Divisie, the second-highest division of professional football in the Netherlands. PSV Eindhoven is the biggest club of North Brabant, and most successful with 25 Eredivisie titles, 1 European Cup and 1 UEFA Cup, among many other domestic cups, and is one of the traditional "big three" clubs in the Netherlands.

Location of professional association football clubs in North Brabant

==== Hockey ====
North Brabant is home to 3 hockey clubs that play in the Hoofdklasse. HC Den Bosch ('s-Hertogenbosch), Oranje Zwart (Eindhoven) and MOP (Vught). Oranje Zwart is the most successful of these clubs with many prizes, in the regular competition as well as in Europe. The most recent prizes are National Champions in 2014–2015, 2015–2016 and European Champions in 2014–2015. In 2016, Oranje Zwart merged with the smaller EMHC into Oranje-Rood. Since then, mens team has always played in the highest league.

== Politics ==
The States of North Brabant (Staten van Noord-Brabant) have 55 seats and are headed by the King's Commissioner (Commissaris van de Koning), currently Ina Adema. Whereas the provincial council (the States-Provincial - Provinciale Staten) is elected by the inhabitants, the Commissioner is appointed by the King and the cabinet of the Netherlands. With 10 seats, People's Party for Freedom and Democracy is the largest party in the council, closely followed by Christian Democratic Appeal and Socialist Party, both with 9 seats.

The daily affairs of the province are taken care of by the Provincial-Executive (Gedeputeerde Staten), which are also headed by the Commissioner; its members (commissioners - gedeputeerden) can be compared with ministers.

=== States-Provincial ===
Results in North Brabant in the elections for the States-Provincial:

Results for the States-Provincial
Parties	2007	2011	2015	2019	2023
Farmer–Citizen Movement	-	-	-	-	11
JA21	-	-	-	-	2
Volt	-	-	-	-	1
VVD	11	12	10	10	9
Forum for Democracy	-	-	-	9	1
CDA	18	10	9	8	4
SP	12	8	9	5	4
D66	1	5	7	5	4
GreenLeft	2	3	3	5	5
PVV	-	8	7	4	4
PvdA	8	7	4	3	4
50PLUS	-	1	2	2	1
Party for the Animals	1	1	2	2	2
ChristianUnion-SGP	1	0	1	1	1
Local Brabant	-	-	1	1	2
other parties	0	0	0	0	0
Total	55	55	55	55	55

- See also: States of North Brabant (more information)

== Religion ==
Religion in North Brabant (2015)
1. Catholicism (48.0%)
2. Not religious (38.8%)
3. Protestant Church in the Netherlands (5.60%)
4. Islam (4.40%)
5. Other (3.30%)

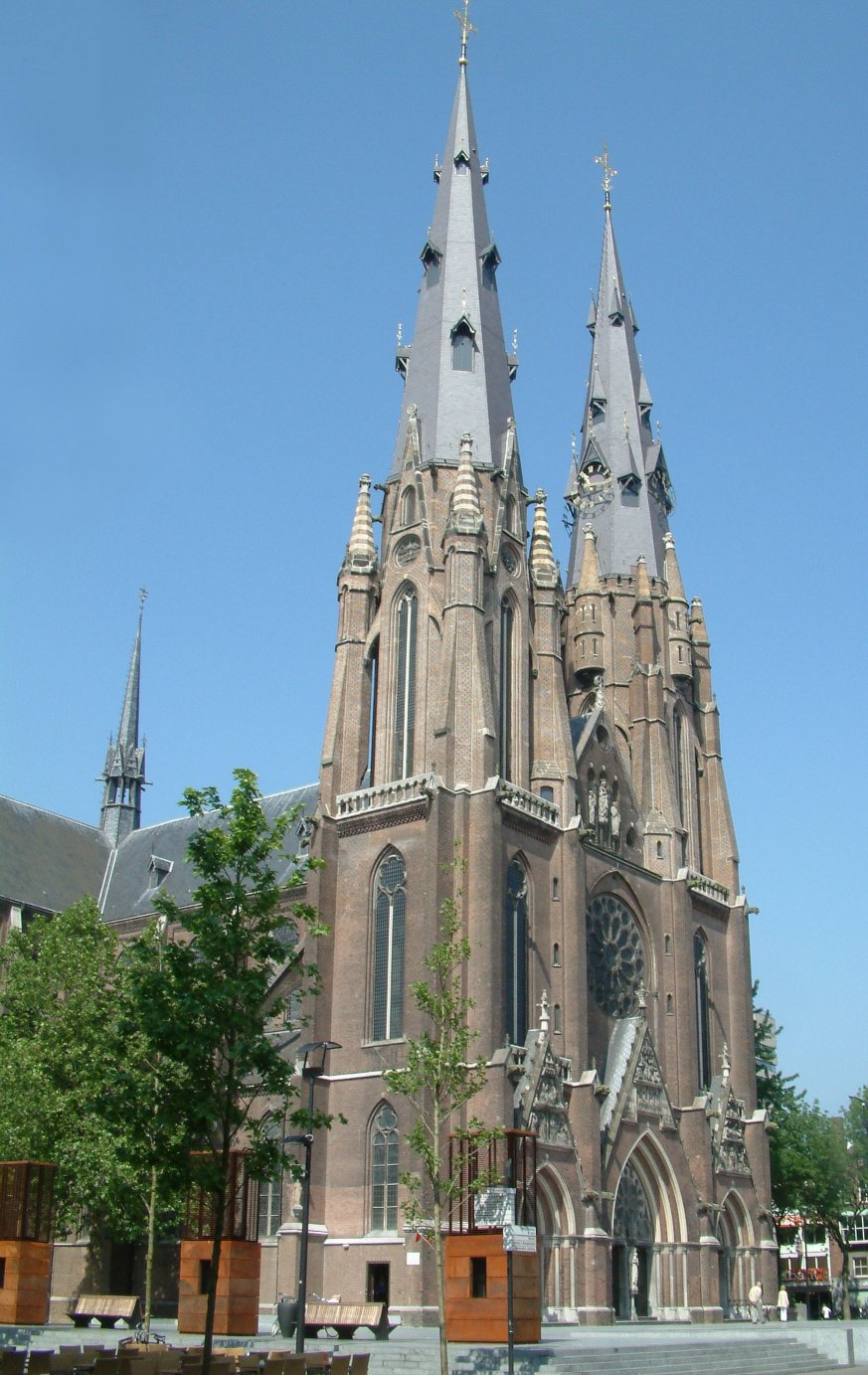
St. Catherine's Church, a Roman Catholic church in Eindhoven

Traditionally the province of North Brabant has been strongly Roman Catholic, in contrast to most of the rest of the Netherlands. Following the country's independence, Catholics faced discrimination by the Protestant government until the mid-19th century. During the 1960s the relatively strong demarcation between the Catholic south on one side and the Calvinist west and north on the other side of the Netherlands started to diminish. In the second half of the 20th century a rapid secularization took place in North Brabant.

In 2015 slightly fewer than half (48%) of the Brabantian people reported adhering to Catholicism, while 5.6% adhered to the Protestant Church in the Netherlands, 4.4% to Islam, 3.3% to other churches or faiths. More than a third (38.8%) of the population identified as non-religious.

Although much of the population identifies as Catholic, regular attendance at Mass is low. For example, in the Diocese of 's-Hertogenbosch, the eastern part of North Brabant and part of the province of Gelderland, 1,167,000 people reported in 2006 an association with Roman Catholicism (56.8 percent of the population). However, only 45,645 residents of this area attended the mass on average, which was only 2 percent of the total population of the area. In western North Brabant (Diocese of Breda) the number of people associating themselves with Catholicism also strongly decreased; only 52 percent of the West Brabantians identify as Roman Catholic. Church attendance was even lower in the west, with only 1 percent of the West Brabantian population attending Mass. North Brabant is mostly Catholic by tradition. Residents may adhere to certain traditions as a base for their cultural identity, but the vast majority of the Catholic population is now largely irreligious in practice. Research among Catholics in the Netherlands in 2007 showed that only 27% of the Dutch Catholics could be regarded as theist, while 55% were ietsist or nontheist and 17% were agnostic.

== Famous Brabantians ==
Politics, science, religion

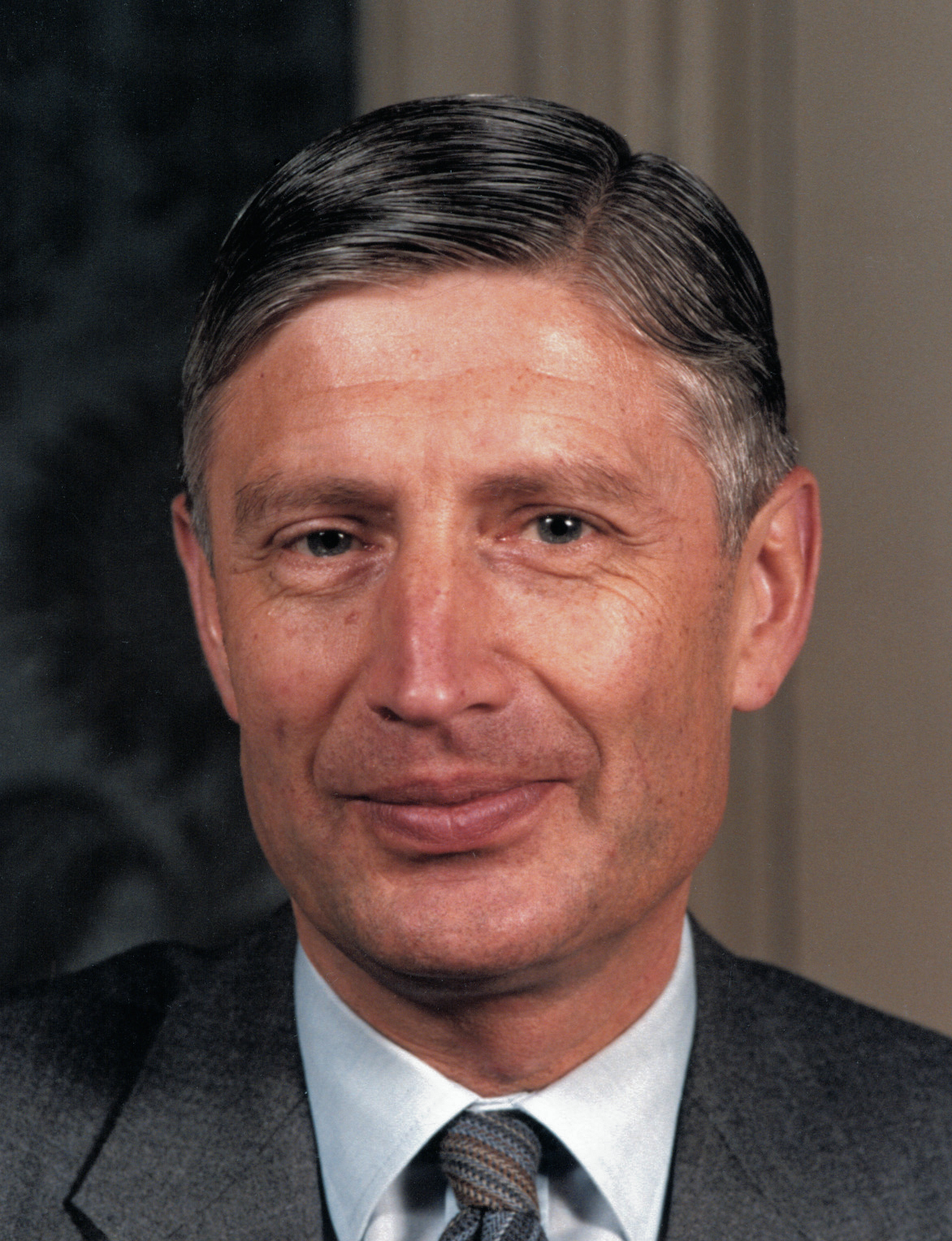
Dries van Agt

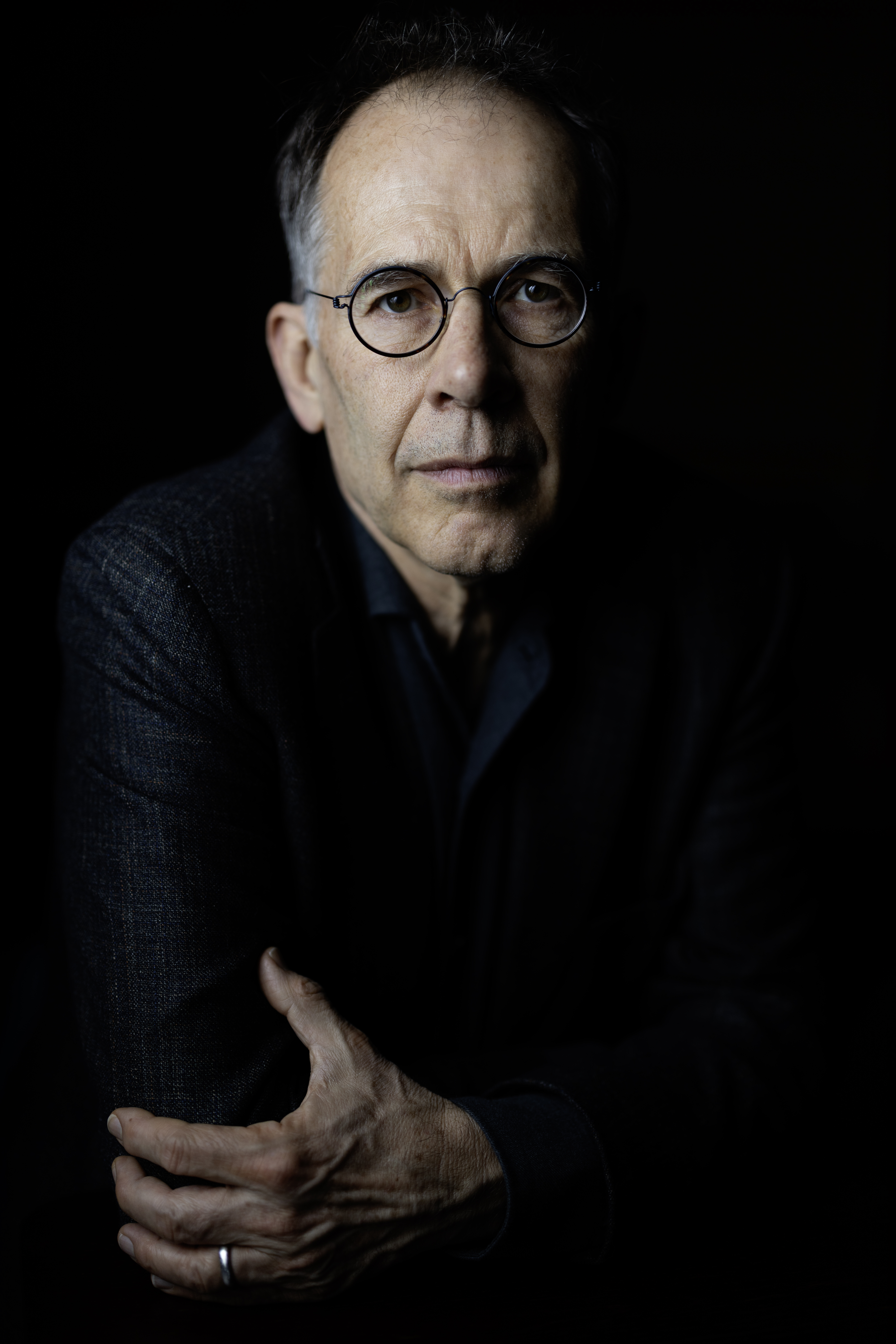
Guido Imbens

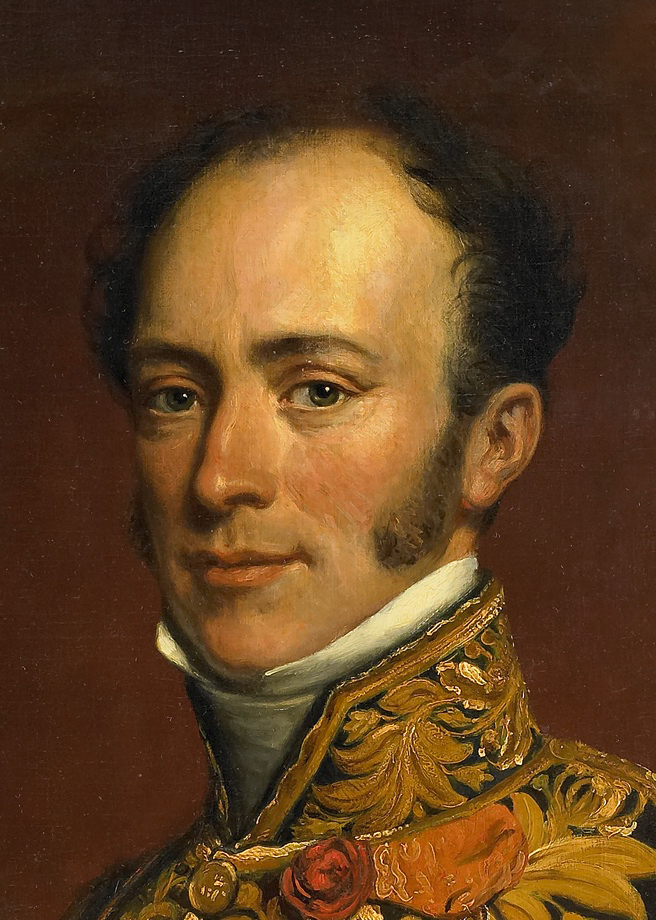
Jan Jacob Rochussen

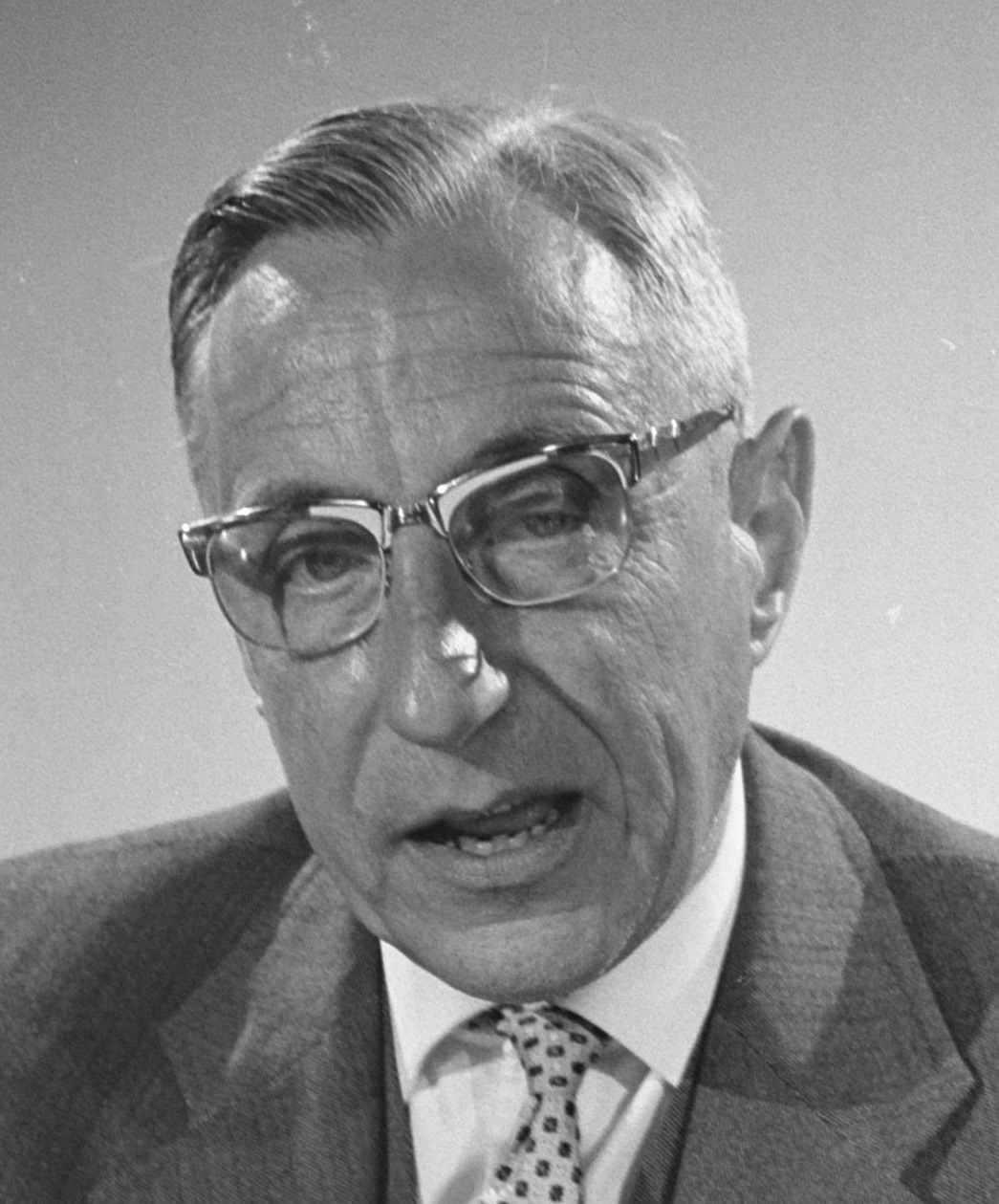
Jan de Quay

- Dries van Agt (1931–2024) - Politician, Prime Minister of the Netherlands
- Gerrit Verdooren van Asperen (1757–1824) - Vice-admiral of the Royal Netherlands Navy
- Johannes Goropius Becanus (1519–1573) - Physician and writer
- Martinus Becanus (1563–1624) - Theologian
- Marcus Zuerius van Boxhorn (1612–1653) - Scholar
- Henk van den Breemen (1941–2024) - General, Chief of Defence of the Netherlands
- Jean Conrad de Kock (1755–1794) - Lawyer
- Colonel Tom Parker (1909–1997) - Talent manager
- Christiaan Cornelissen (1864–1942) - Journalist and economist
- Wim Crusio (1954) - Behavioral neurogeneticist
- Adriaen van der Donck (c.1618–1655) - Lawyer, colonial landowner
- Franciscus Donders (1818–1889) - Ophthalmologist
- Laurens Storm van 's Gravesande (1704–1775) - Colonial governor
- Willem 's Gravesande (1688–1742) - Mathematician
- Johan Bax van Herenthals (1901–1985) - Colonial governor
- Willem Hendrik Johan van Idsinga (1822–1896) - Governor of the Dutch Gold Coast and of Surinam
- Guido Imbens (1963) - Economist, Nobel prize winner
- Hendrik Merkus de Kock (1779–1845) - Governor-General of the Dutch East Indies
- Pieter Gerardus van Overstraten (1755–1801) - Governor-General of the Dutch East Indies
- Jan de Quay (1901–1985) - Politician, Prime Minister of the Netherlands
- Macropedius (1487–1558) - Humanist
- Frits Philips (1905–2005) - Entrepreneur
- Wilhelm de Raet (c.1537-1583) - Engineer
- René of Chalon (1519–1544) - Stadtholder of Holland, Zeeland, Utrecht and Gelre
- Jan Jacob Rochussen (1797–1871) - Politician, Prime Minister of the Netherlands
- Bram Stemerdink (born 1936) - Politician
- Martinus J. G. Veltman (1931–2021) - Physicist, Nobel prize winner
- Gisbertus Voetius (1589–1676) - Theologian
- Frans de Waal (1948–2024) - Primatologist and ethologist

Entertainment, arts

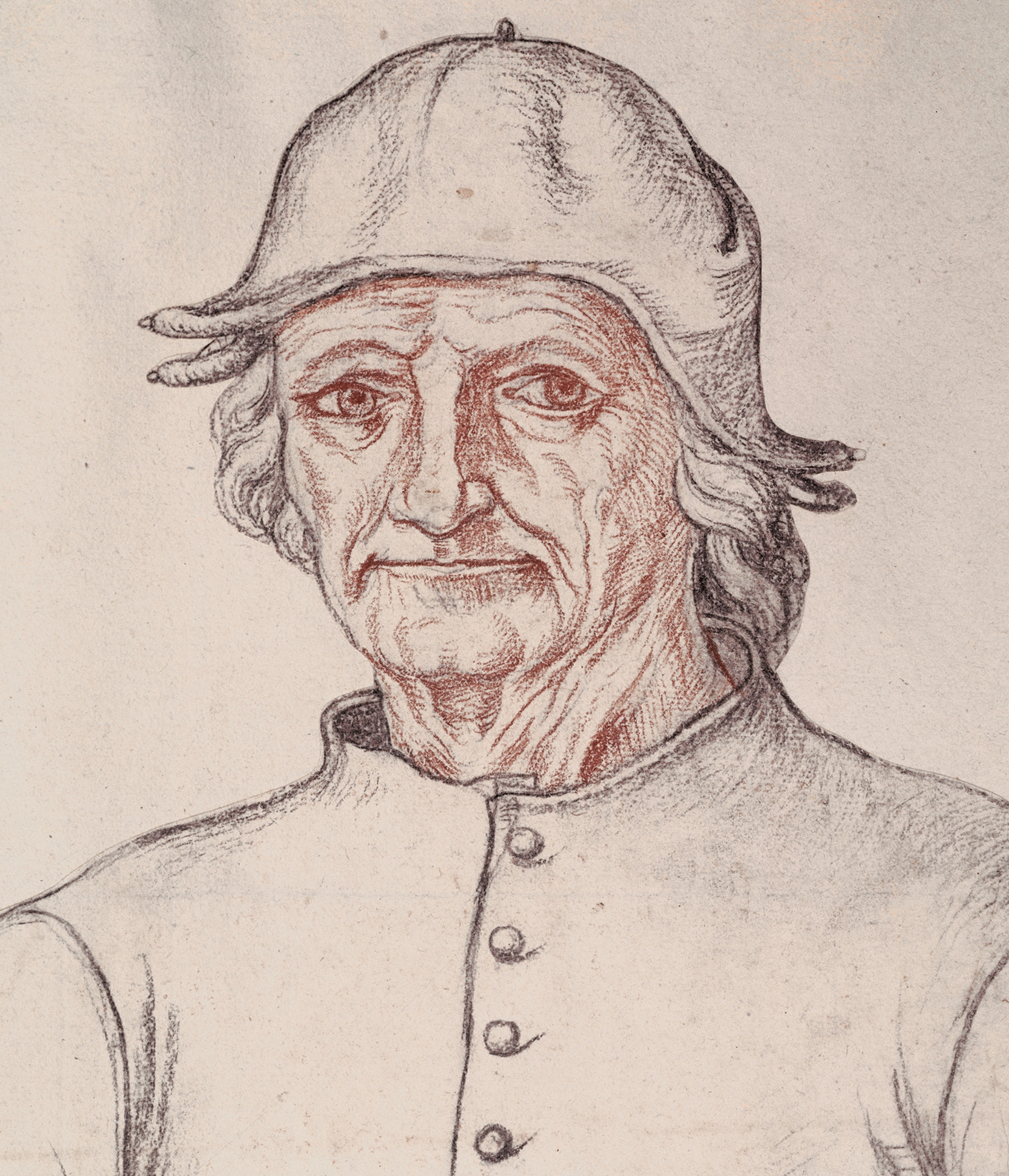
Hieronymus Bosch

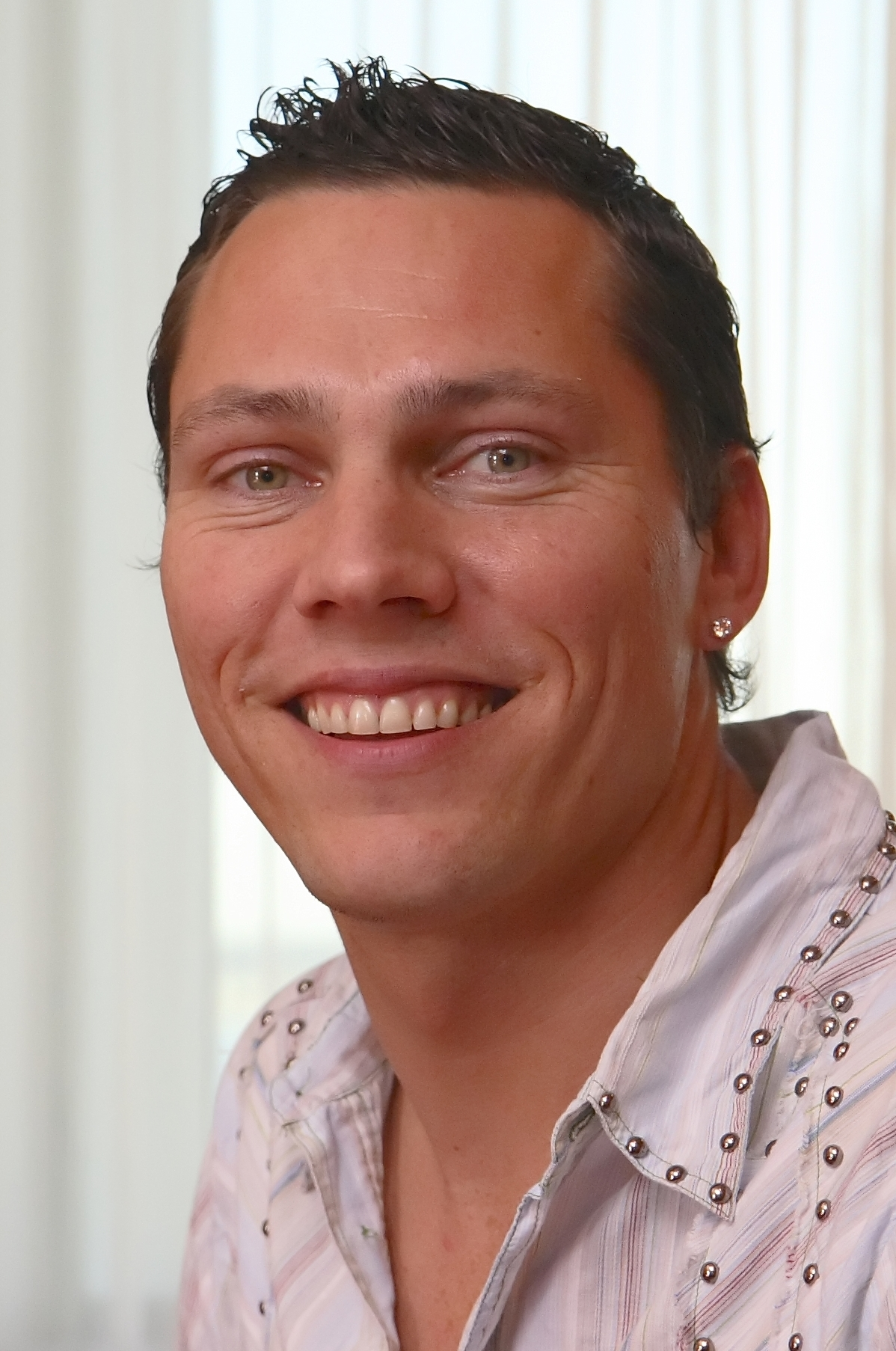
Tiësto

- Quirinus van Amelsfoort (1760–1820) - Painter
- Jan de Bont (1943) - Film director
- Hieronymus Bosch (c.1450–1516) - Painter
- Thomas Willeboirts Bosschaert (1613–1654) - Painter
- Brooks (1995) - Disc jockey
- Dirck van Delen (c.1605–1671) - Painter
- Martin Desjardins (1637–1694) - Painter
- Abraham van Diepenbeeck (1596–1675) - Painter
- Sander van Doorn (1979) - Disc jockey
- Anton van Duinkerken (1903–1968) - Poet
- Bartram de Fouchier (1609–1673) - Painter
- Hubert Gerhard (c.1540–1620) - Sculptor
- Lucas Gassel (c.1485–1568) - Painter
- Hardwell (1988) - Disc jockey
- Floor Jansen (1981) - Singer
- Joseph August Knip (1777–1847) - Painter
- Lenny Kuhr (1950) - Singer-songwriter
- Jacob Obrecht (1457/8–1505) - Composer
- Jan Soens (c. 1547–c. 1611) - Painter
- Cornelis van Spaendonck (1756–1839) - Painter
- Gerard van Spaendonck (1746–1822) - Painter
- Lara Stone (1983) - Model
- Theodoor van Thulden (1606–1669) - Painter
- Tiësto (1969) - Disc jockey
- W&W - Record production duo
- Dirck Wijntrack (1615–1678) - Painter
- Pieter van der Willigen (1634–1694)
- Leon de Winter (1954) - Novelist

Sports

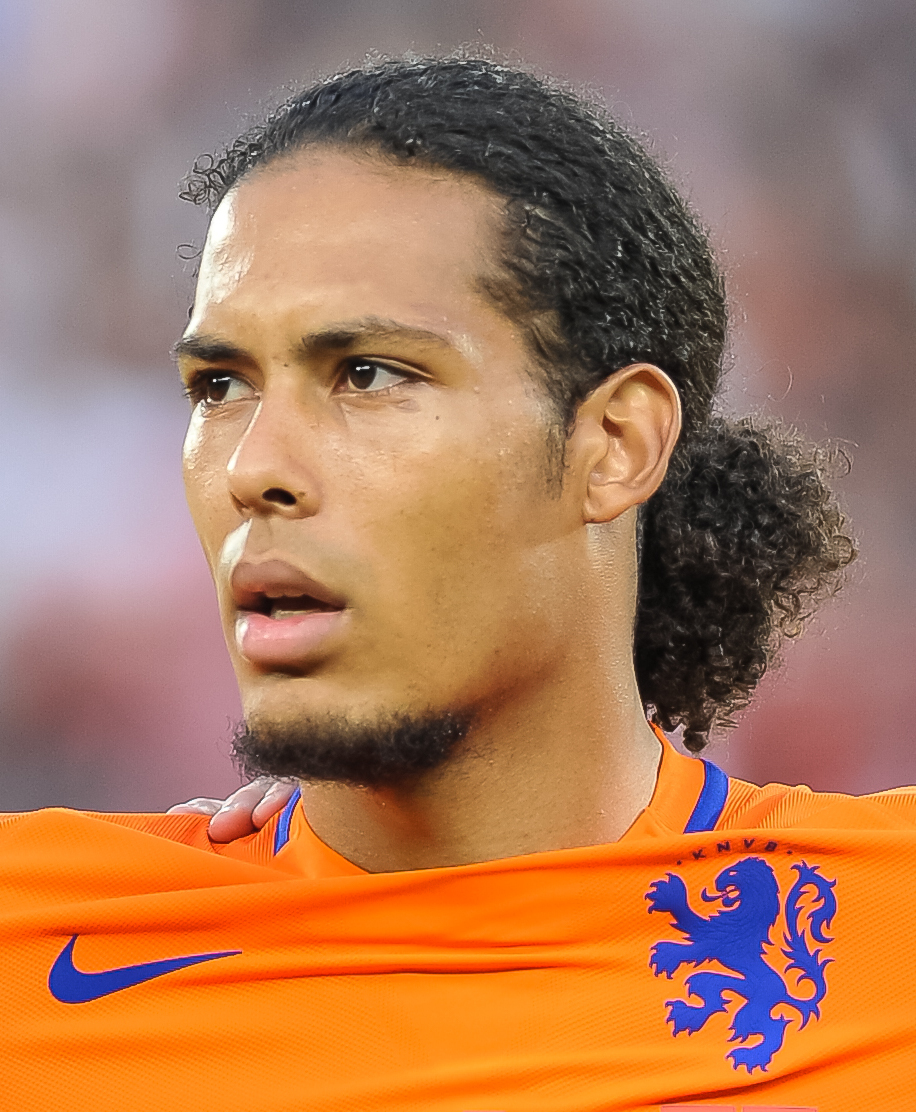
Virgil van Dijk

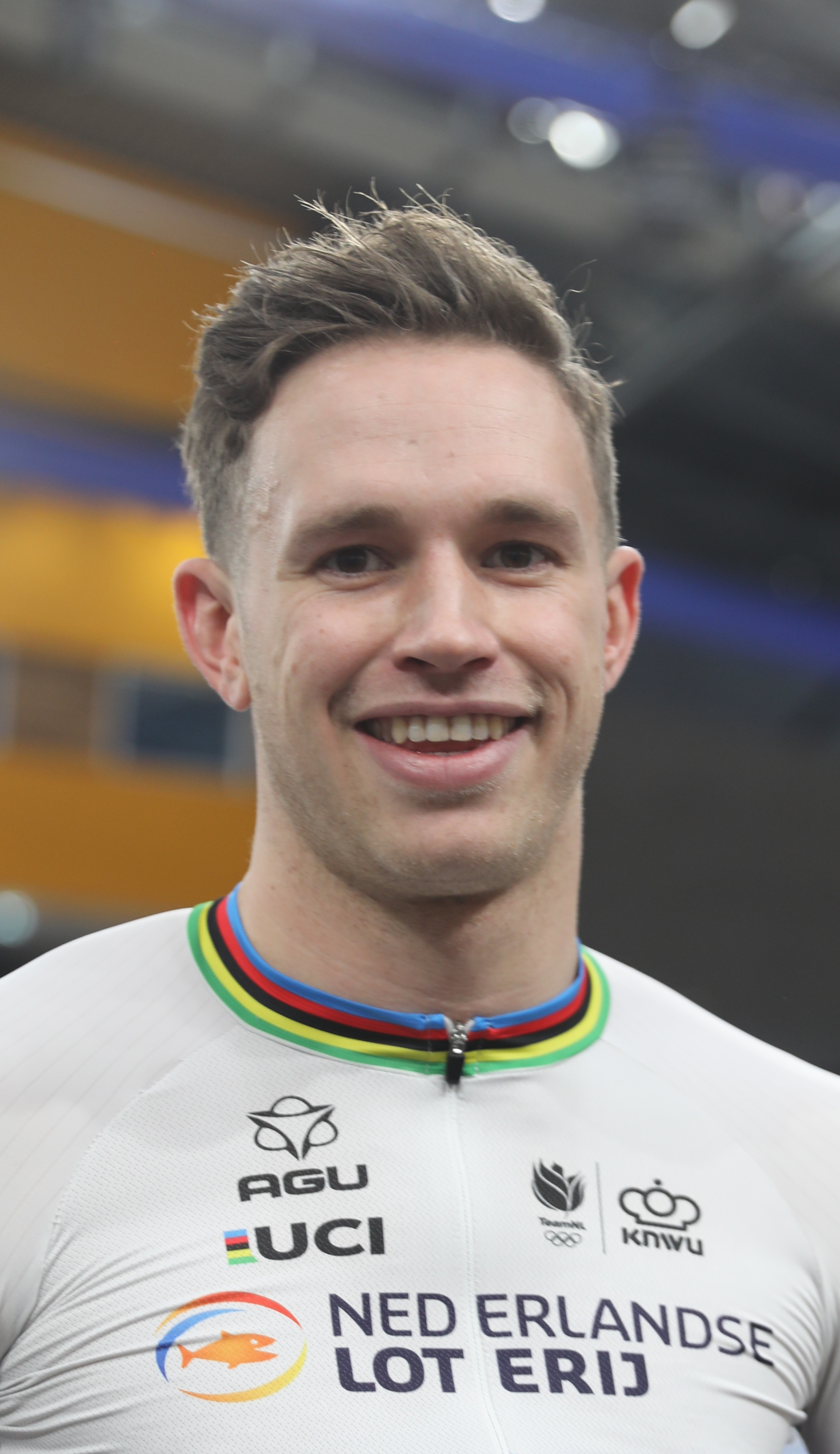
Harrie Lavreysen

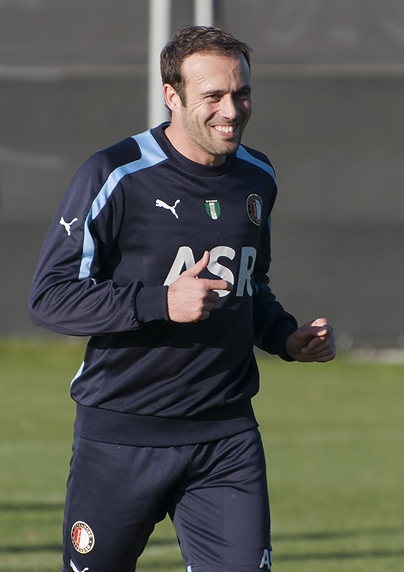
Joris Mathijsen

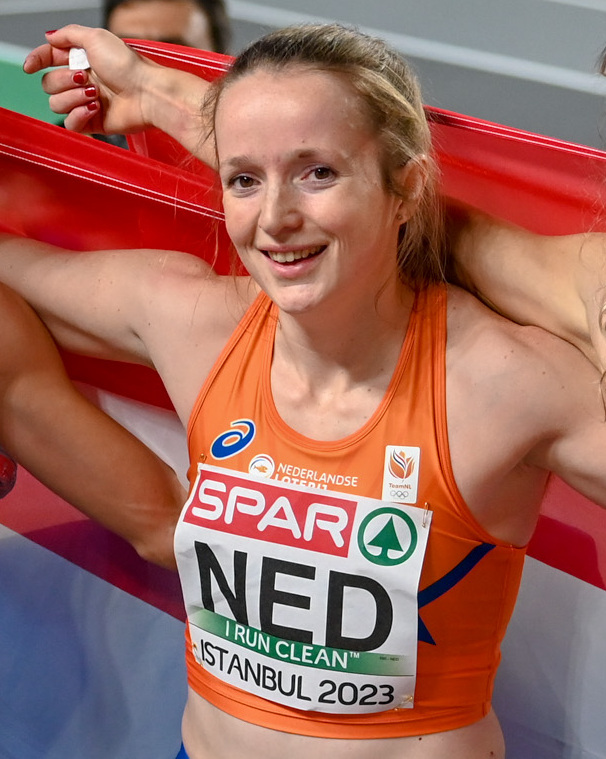
Cathelijn Peeters

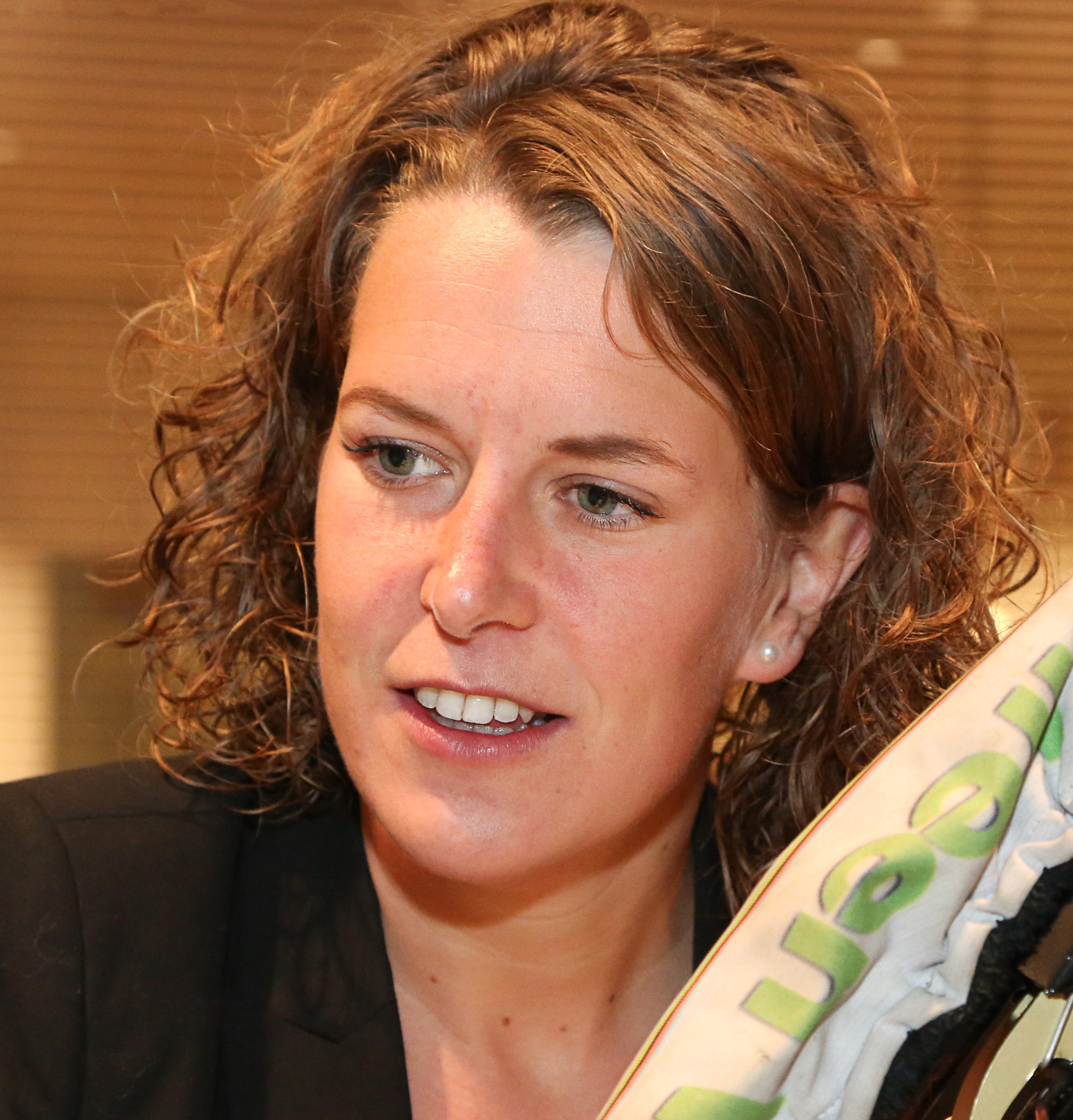
Ireen Wüst

- Berry van Aerle (1962) - Football player
- Peter Aerts (1970) - Kickboxer
- Henk Baars (1960) - Cyclo-cross cyclist
- Imke Bartels (1977) - Equestrian
- Tineke Bartels (1951) - Equestrian
- Roy Beerens (1987) - Football player
- Rinus Bennaars (1931–2021) - Football player
- Lars Boom (1985) - Cyclist
- Wilfred Bouma (1978) - Football player
- Piet Van Boxtel (1902–1991) - Football player
- Bud Brocken (1957–2025) - Football player
- Karin Brienesse (1969) - Swimmer
- Jan van den Broek (1907–1964) - Football player
- Sjel de Bruyckere (1928–2011) - Football player
- Phillip Cocu (1970) - Football player
- Virgil van Dijk (1991) - Football player
- Sanne van Dijke (1995) - Judoka
- Daniëlle van de Donk (1991) - Football player
- Kika van Es (1991) - Football player
- Cody Gakpo (1999) - Football player
- Jean-Paul van Gastel (1972) - Football player
- Leo Ghering (1900–1966) - Football player
- Hans Gillhaus (1963) - Football player
- Jackie Groenen (1994) - Football player
- Anky van Grunsven (1968) - Equestrian
- Jeffrey Herlings (1994) - Motocross racer
- Marc van Hintum (1967) - Football player
- Wim Hofkens (1958) - Football player
- Pierre van Hooijdonk (1969) - Football player
- Kees van Ierssel (1945) - Football player
- Vincent Janssen (1994) - Football player
- René van de Kerkhof (1951) - Football player
- Willy van de Kerkhof (1951) - Football player
- Irene de Kok (1963) - Judoka
- Cor Kools (1907–1985) - Football player
- Adick Koot (1963) - Football player
- Michel van de Korput (1956) - Football player
- Adrie van Kraay (1953) - Football player
- Willy van der Kuijlen (1946–2021) - Football player
- Theo Laseroms (1940–1991) - Football player
- Harrie Lavreysen (1997) - Track cyclist
- Dirk Lippits (1977) - Rower
- Joris Mathijsen (1980) - Football player
- Noud van Melis (1924–2001) - Football player
- Toine van Mierlo (1957) - Football player
- Kees Mijnders (1912–2002) - Football player
- Leontien van Moorsel (1970) - Cyclist
- Ruud van Nistelrooy (1976) - Football player
- Aniek Nouwen (1999) - Football player
- Cathelijn Peeters (1996) - Track and field athlete
- Kees Pijl (1897–1976) - Football player
- Miel Pijs (1941) - Football player
- Nico Rijnders (1947–1976) - Football player
- Kees Rijvers (1926–2024) - Football player
- Jan van Roessel (1925–2011) - Football player
- Gianni Romme (1973) - Speed skater
- Sjef van Run (1904–1973) - Football player
- Bas Rutten (1964) - MMA artist
- Daan Schrijvers (1941–2018) - Football player
- Angelique Seriese (1968) - Judoka
- Renée Slegers (1989) - Football player
- Henk van Spaandonck (1913–1982) - Football player
- Wim Suurbier (1945–2020) - Football player
- Simon Tahamata (1956) - Football player
- Frans Tebak (1927–2002) - Football player
- Jan Tops (1961) - Equestrian
- Rico Verhoeven (1989) - Kickboxer
- Antoon Verlegh (1896–1960) - Football player
- Eric Viscaal (1968) - Football player
- Maikel van der Vleuten (1988) - Equestrian
- Marianne Vos (1987) - Cyclist
- Ireen Wüst (1986) - Speed skater
- Klaas-Erik Zwering (1981) - Swimmer

== See also ==
- Brabantian dialect
- Brabantse Stedenrij
- BrabantStad
- Campine
- De Peel
- Generality Lands
- Samenwerkingsverband Regio Eindhoven
- Uden-Veghel
