= Peel, Netherlands =

Bog area on the border of the Dutch provinces of North Brabant and Limburg

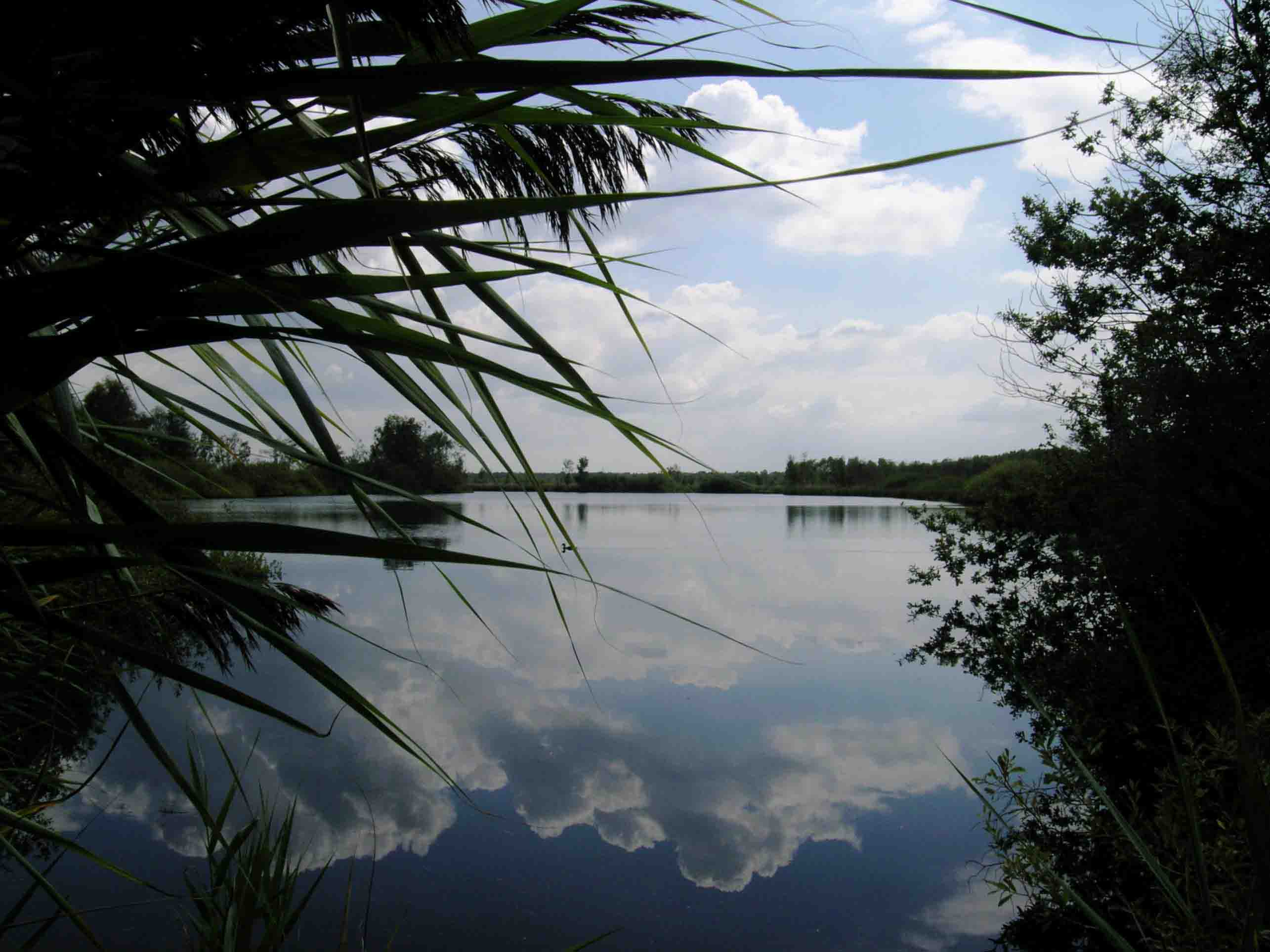
A peat lake near Griendtsveen

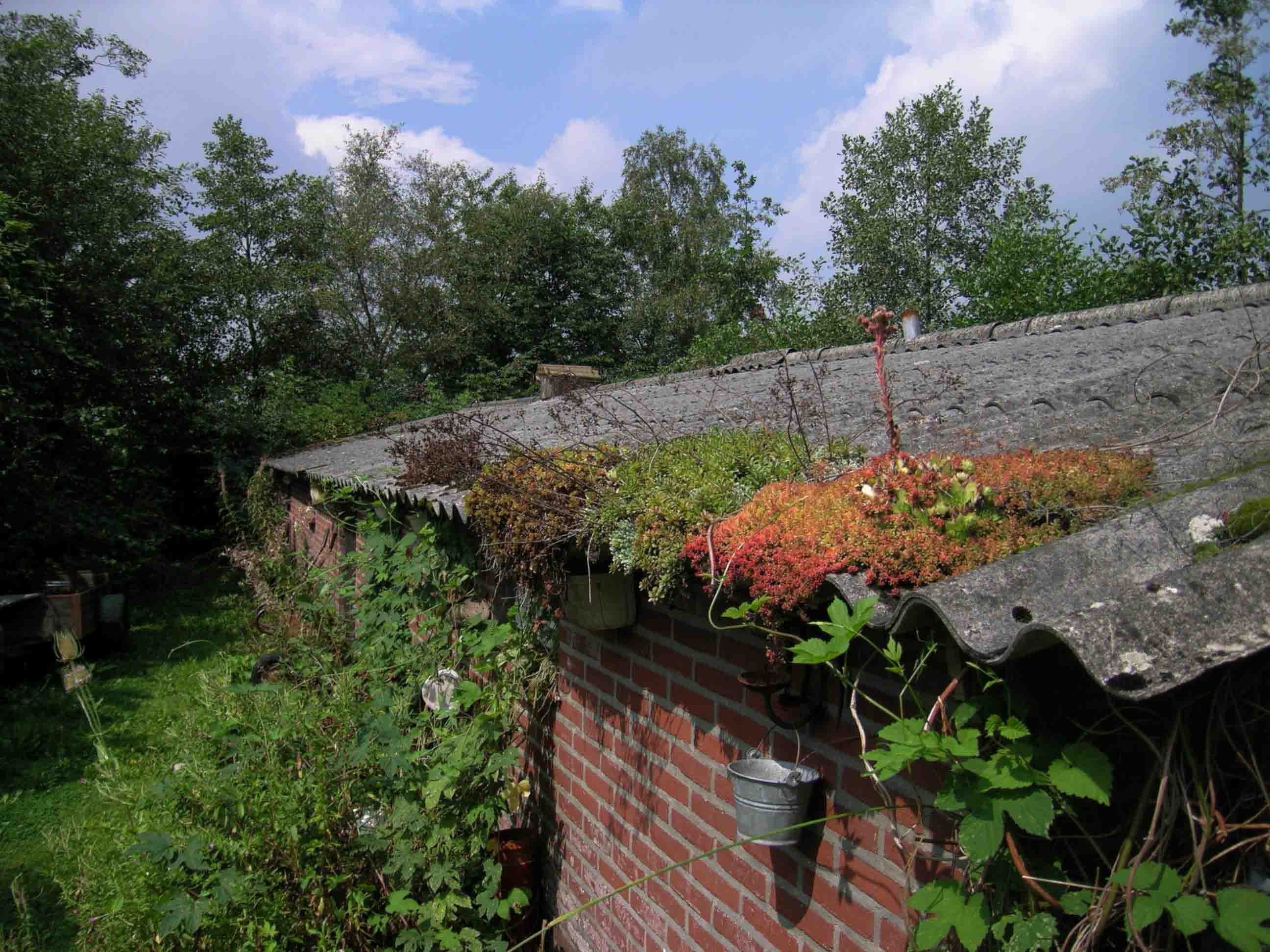
A barn roof with vegetation typical of the region

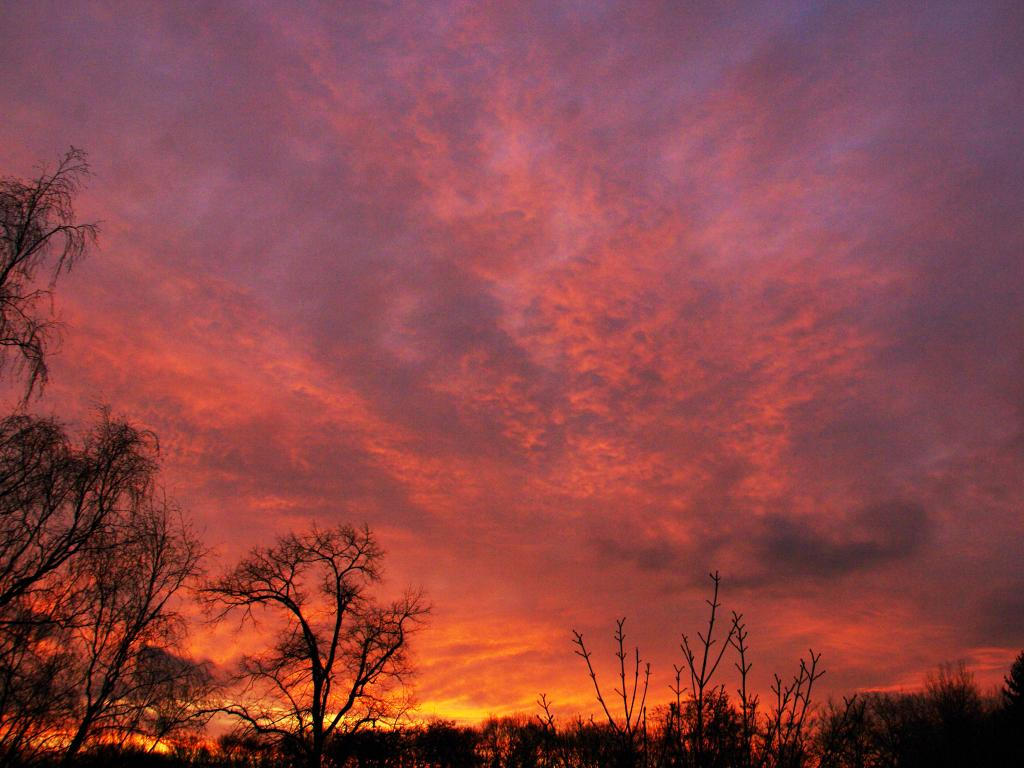
Sunset in De Peel, North Brabant, Netherlands

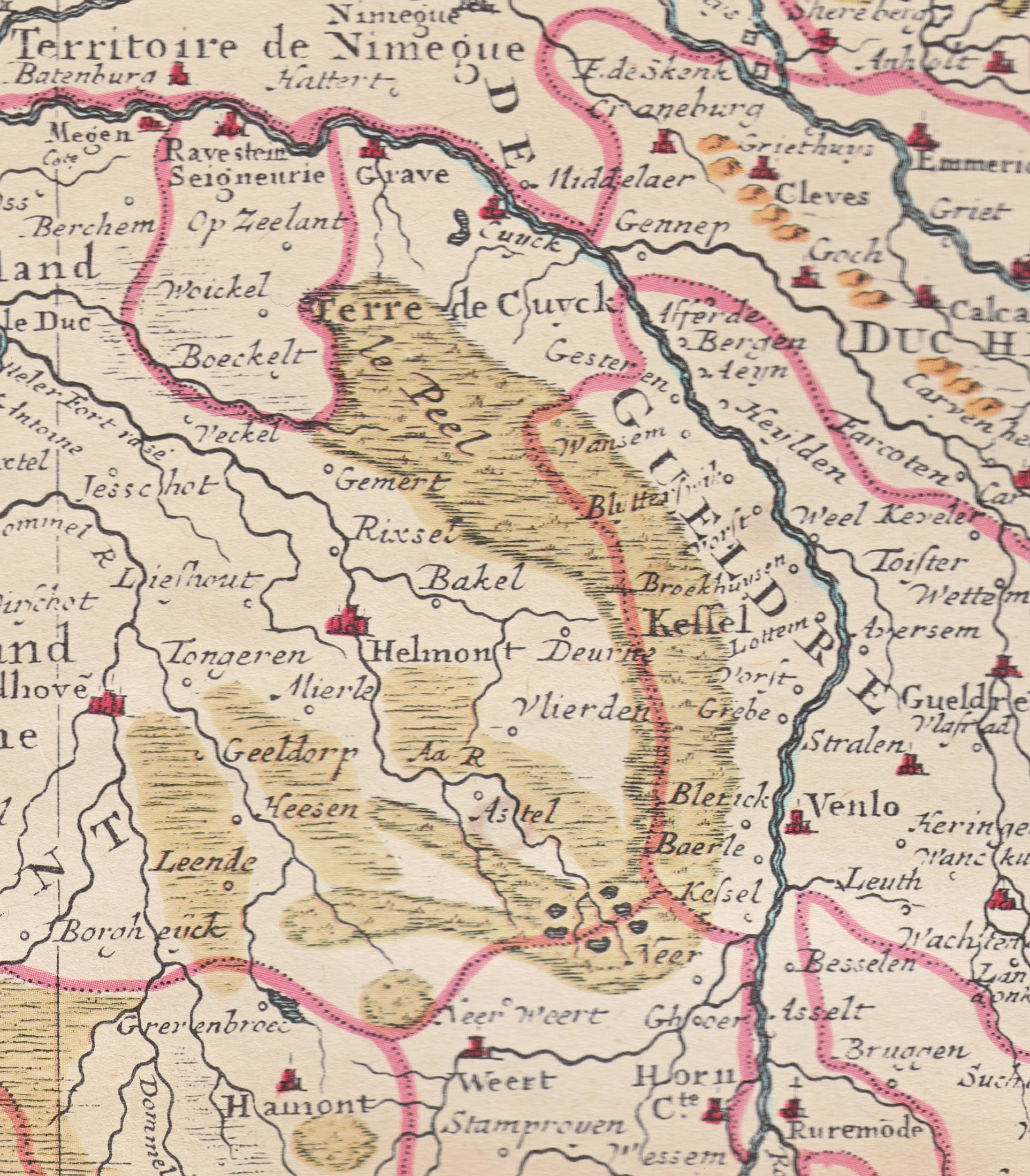
Peel area on a map by Guillaume Delisle, ca. 1743

De Peel is a region in the southeast of the Netherlands that straddles the border between the provinces of North Brabant and Limburg.

From the Middle Ages until the 20th century, peat was extracted from the Peel for use as fuel. For this purpose many canals were dug to remove the water and for ships to move out the peat. The first recorded excavation was in 1427, and it was reported in 1670 that locals were not only collecting peat for their own use but selling it to nearby villages. By the 19th century the quantity of peat remaining in the area may have been as little as a quarter of the original level. Intensive commercial excavation began in 1853, but the industry soon declined as a result of several national economic crises. Peat excavation in the region ended in 1942.

In 1910, a collection of Roman artefacts was discovered in the peat bogs near Deurne. These included a helmet, a sword, a coin purse, two bells, several sheets of leather, and various items of clothing. The helmet and the coins date the artefacts to 320 AD. It was also reported that a human fibula, or leg bone, was among the finds, but the documentary evidence for this is scant. Archaeologist W. C. Braat speculated that a Roman horseman had accidentally stumbled into the bog, but more recent analysis shows that the artefacts are more likely to have been deliberately and ritually deposited.

An area that has remained partly untouched by the peat-cutting was turned into a National Park, the Groote Peel. It has a size of 13.4 km^{2} (5.2 sq mi).

It is one of the most bird-rich areas in Western Europe, with resident black-necked grebes and sometimes migrating common cranes in October/November. The terrain is varied with inaccessible peat swamps, lakes, heath land and sand ridges. The present swamp and some of the lakes were created by the cutting of peat.

There are many villages in the Peel, most of them founded by bosses of peat companies: for example, Helenaveen and Griendtsveen, founded by Jan van de Griendt (1804–1882).

== Trivia ==
- The Northern Limburgish band Rowwen Hèze made a well-known song about the area named: De Peel in brand (The Peel on fire).
