= De Groote Peel National Park =

National Park in the Peel, a region in the Southeast of the Netherlands

- Nationaal Park De Groote Peel
- IUCN category II (national park)
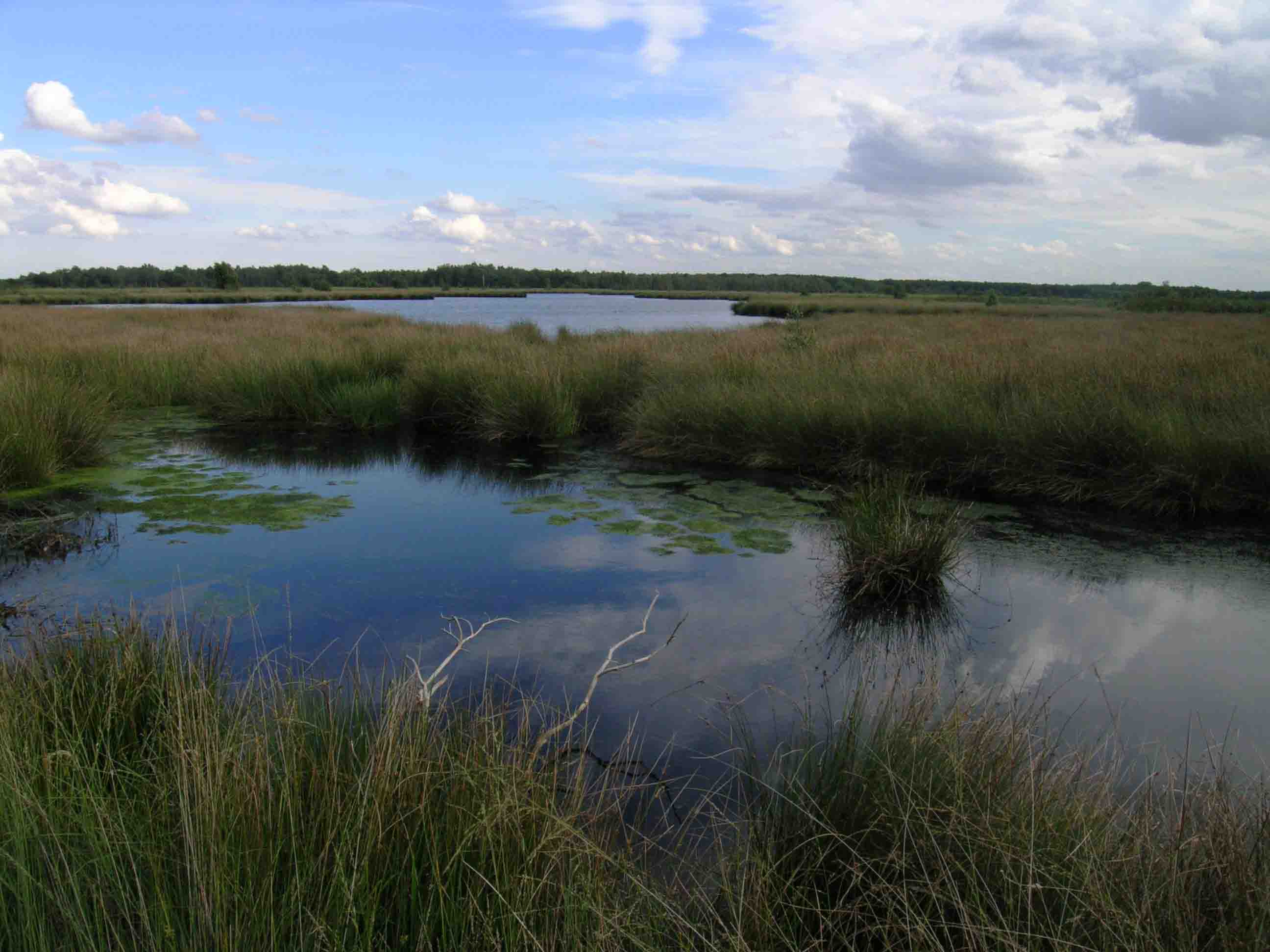

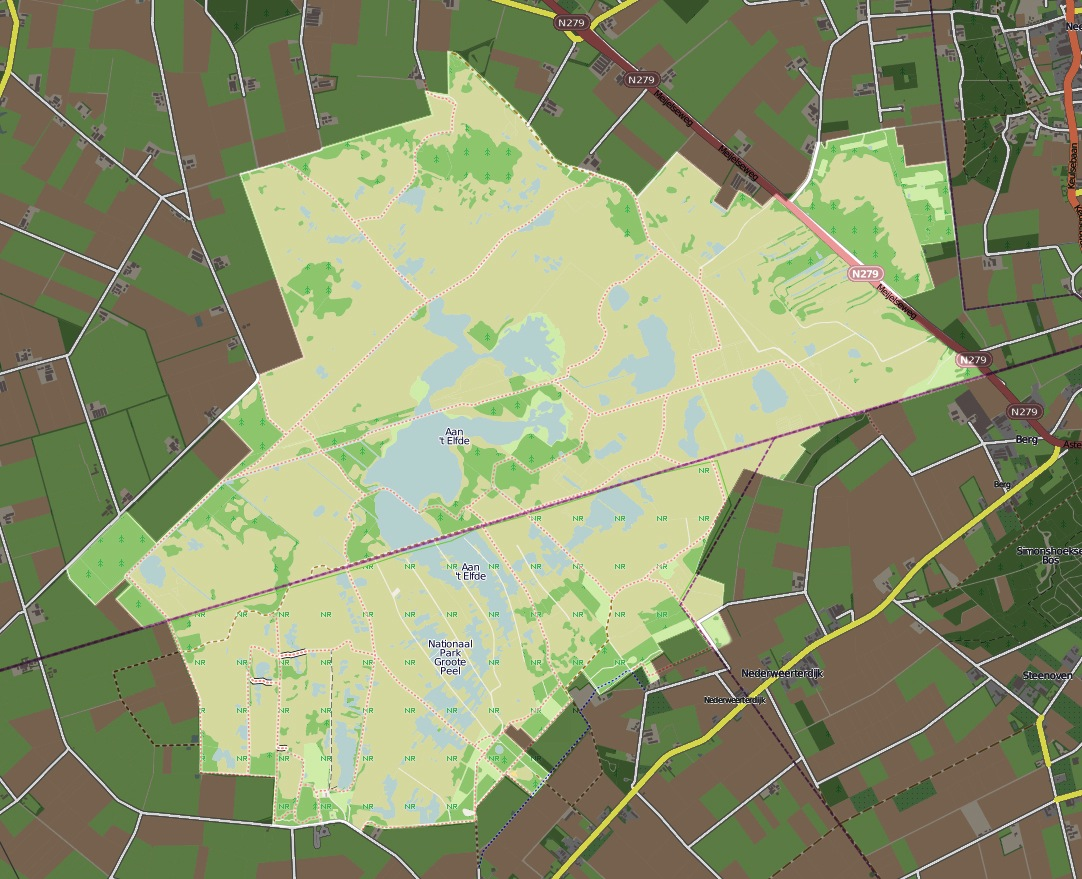
- Map of the National Park
- Location: North Brabant and Limburg, Netherlands
- Coordinates: 51°21′N 5°49′E
- Area: 13.4 km^{2} (5.2 sq mi)
- Established: 1993
- Governing body: Overlegorgaan De Groote Peel
- Website: npdepeel.nl

Ramsar Wetland
- Official name: Groote Peel
- Designated: 23 May 1980
- Reference no.: 192

De Groote Peel National Park is a national park in De Peel, a region in the southeast of the Netherlands on the border between the provinces of Limburg and North Brabant. It has a size of 13.4 km^{2} and preserves a peat bog that has remained partly untouched by peat cutting, which used to be extensive in the area.

It is one of the most bird-rich areas in Western Europe, with resident black-necked grebes and sometimes migrating common cranes in October/November. The terrain is varied with inaccessible peat swamps, lakes, heath land and sand ridges. The present swamp and some of the lakes were created by the cutting of peat.

There is a 3 km-long route guided by red poles with a tower that provides visitors with a view of the wasteland. Care must be taken if leaving the assigned route. The swamps can be treacherous.

== History of the park ==
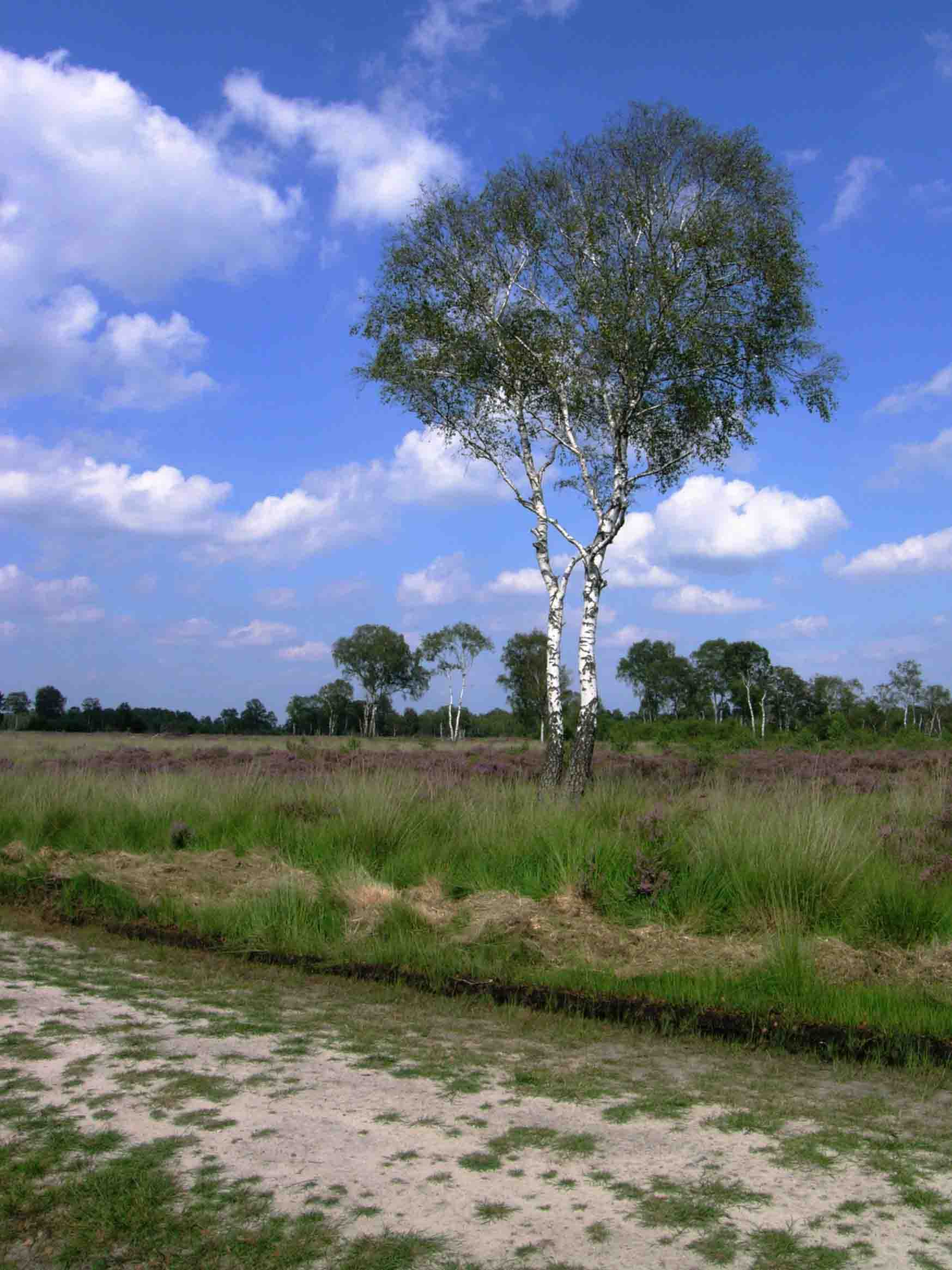
A lonesome birch tree in the heath next to a track

De Groote Peel National Park is one of the last, largely raised bogs that remains uncultivated. De Groote Peel offers a varied landscape of inaccessible peat swamp, lakes, open moorland areas, plains and sand ridges with purple moor. The current landscape of the Groote Peel was created by the excavation of peat. This excavation at some places created large lakes in the marshy landscape. Around the mid-20th century, ridges of trees were planted. The damp and quiet nature make the area attractive to birds. De Groote Peel is one of the richest bird areas in Western Europe. The area has a special vegetation of many rare species. It has been made accessible to visitors through the construction of raised trackways over the extensive swamp areas.
