= Suze Slager-Velsen =

Dutch artist

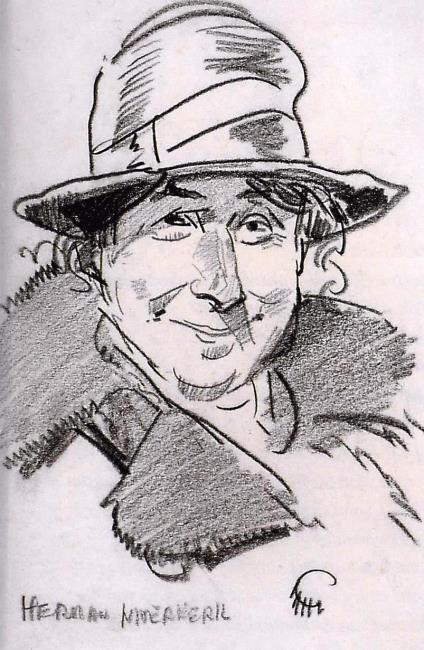
- portrait by Herman Moerkerk
- Born: Suzanna Adriana Velsen; 6 November 1883; Oostburg, Netherlands
- Died: 25 December 1964 (aged 81) 's-Hertogenbosch, Netherlands
- Known for: Painting

Suze Slager-Velsen (1883-1964) was a Dutch painter.

== Biography ==
Slager-Velsen née Velsen was born on 6 November 1883 in Oostburg. She studied at the Academie voor Beeldende Kunsten (Academy of Visual Arts) in Rotterdam. Her teachers included Arthur Briët, Dirk Herman Michaël Harting. She was married to fellow artist Piet Slager jr. (1871-1938) with whom she had one child. Her work was included in the 1939 exhibition and sale Onze Kunst van Heden (Our Art of Today) at the Rijksmuseum in Amsterdam. She was a member of the Arti et Amicitiae and the Kunstenaarsvereniging Sint Lucas.

Slager-Velsen died on 25 December 1964 in 's-Hertogenbosch.

== Legacy ==
Suze Bergé-Slager, Slager-Velsen's daughter, established the Museum Slager in 's-Hertogenbosch. The museum houses works of several generations of Slagers.
