= Eindhoven Museum =

Archaeological open-air museum in Eindhoven, Netherlands

Coordinates: 51°25′26″N 5°28′35″E

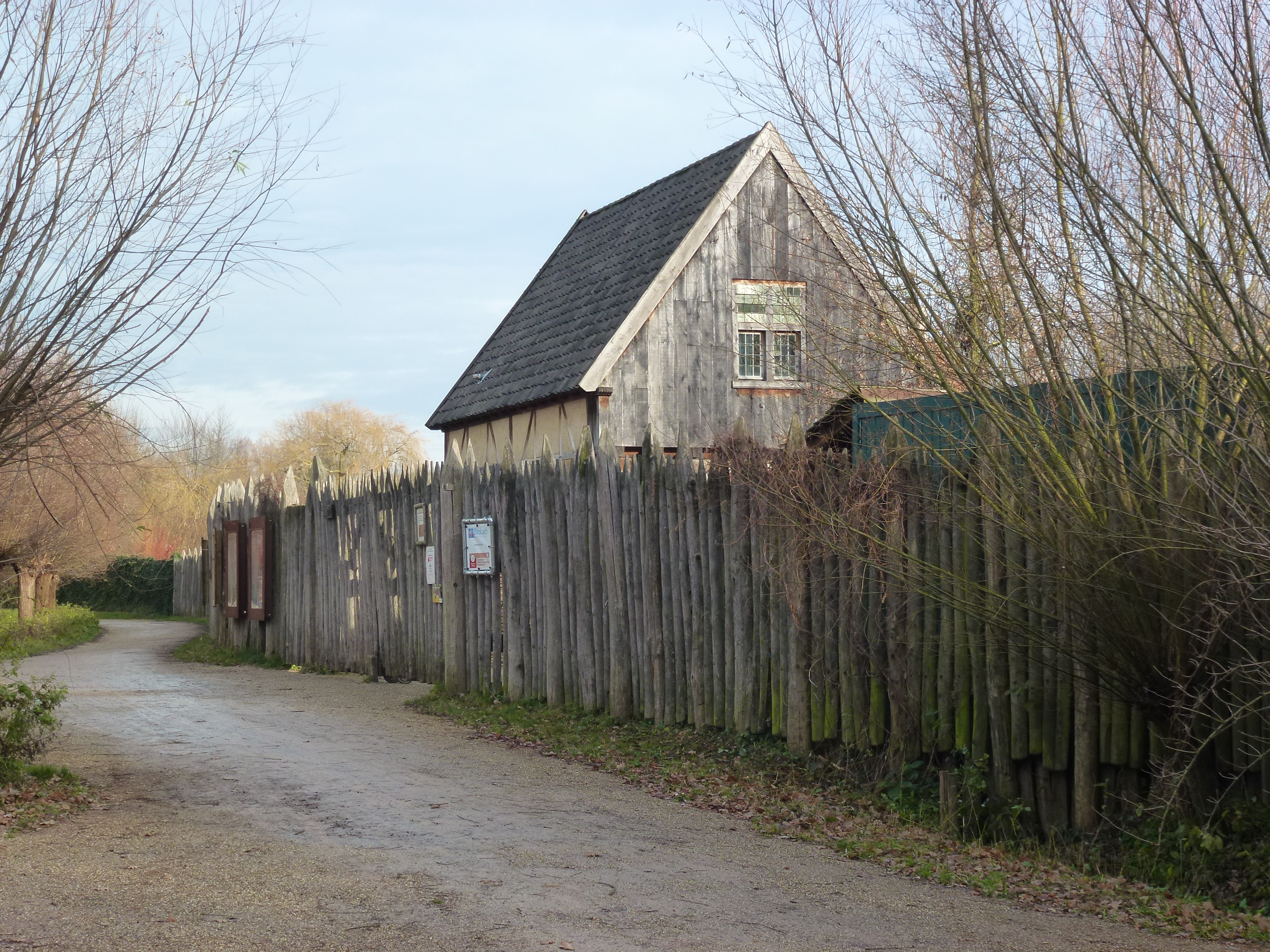
Eindhoven Museum

The Eindhoven Museum is an archaeological open-air museum in Eindhoven, Netherlands, focusing on the Iron Age and Middle Ages in the province of North Brabant. The museum is situated in the Genneper Parken area at the south side of the city. It focuses on the daily lives and routines of people in the time periods mentioned, through demonstrations and recreations of buildings, practices and routines. For example, there are demonstrations of cooking on open fire, of games played in the Middle Ages and groups of school children are allowed to spend the night in the stables.

The museum has several distinct target audiences. Primary among these are school children, who comprise most of the visitors on weekdays. In the weekends and during holiday season the museum focuses on regular tourists. The museum features a lot of living history exhibits as well as semi-historical reenactments. During holiday seasons extra activities are staged for children. The museum also arranges historically themed corporate and family outings outside of opening hours. Some 60,000 people visited the museum in 2005.

== History ==
The Eindhoven Museum was founded in 1982 by a group of teachers from the local teachers academy led by Anneke Boonstra; it was then known as the "prehistoric village". The first ten years were spent slowly and painstakingly building an Iron Age village with help of many volunteers and local unemployed people.

In 1995 the museum drew national and international attention with a life experiment. Officially called "For 2 Moons", it involved a small group (including the director Anneke Boonstra) withdrawing from civilization for two months to live life as it was in the Iron Age.

Towards the end of the 1990s the museum began receiving European subsidies, allowing it to double in size and add a whole new theme on the new grounds: the Middle Ages.

The museum is one of the founding members of EXARC, the international ICOM affiliated association of archaeological open-air museums and experimental archaeology. From 2006 to 2009 the museum was project lead of a European project of 8 archaeological open-air museums, liveARCH. This project was co-authored by Roeland Paardekooper.

Luc Eekhout became director of the museum in September 2010.
