= De Acht Zaligheden =

Coordinates: 51°21′36.77″N 5°18′27.99″E

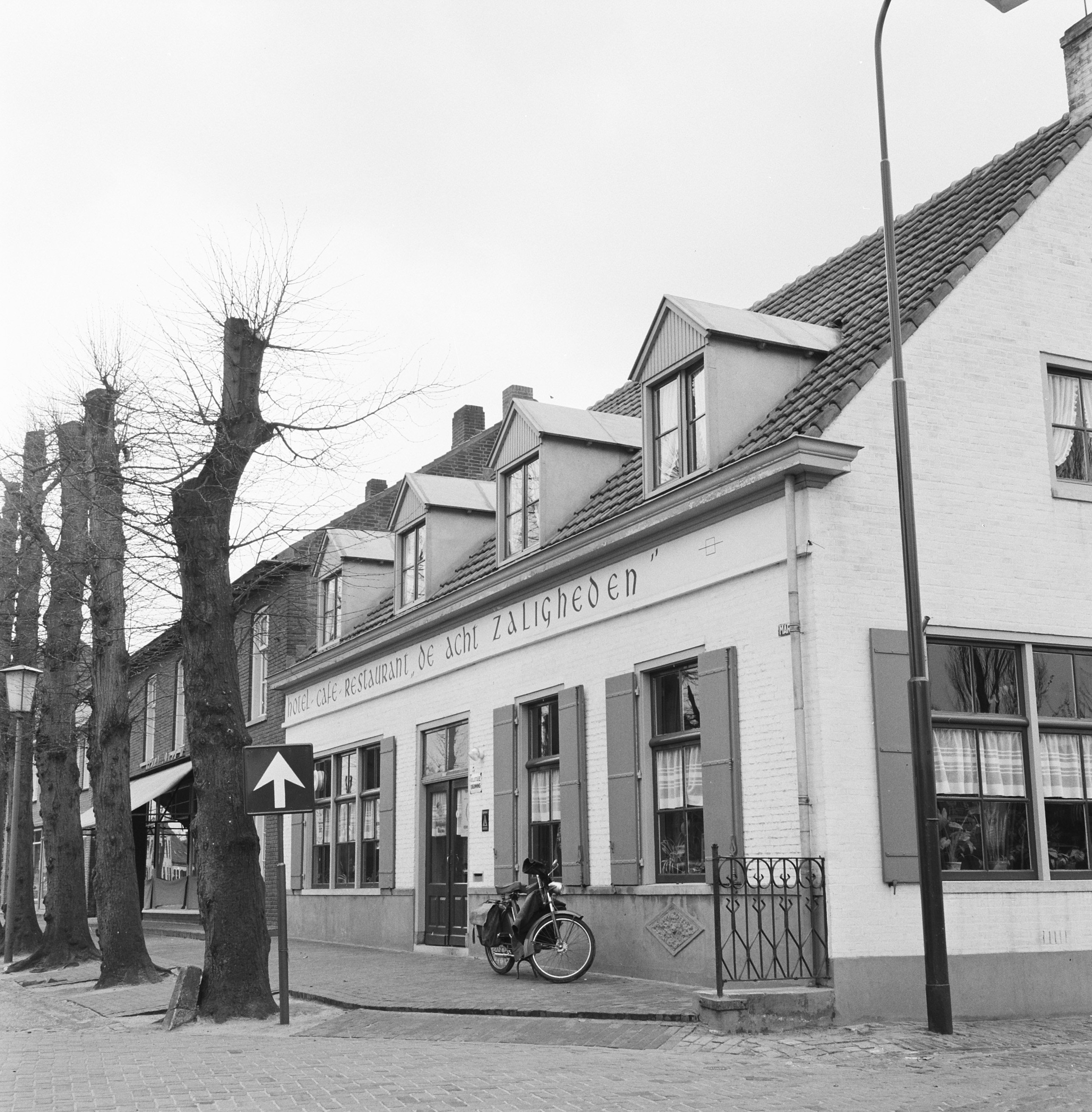
- De Acht Zaligheden in 1958
- Interactive map of De Acht Zaligheden

Restaurant information
- Head chef: Henk van Tuijl
- Food type: French
- Rating: Michelin Guide
- Location: Markt 3, Eersel, 5521 AJ, Netherlands

Restaurant De Acht Zaligheden is a defunct restaurant in Eersel, in the Netherlands. It was a fine dining restaurant that was awarded one Michelin star in the period 1983–1995.

In the time of the Michelin stars, Henk van Tuijl was the owner and head chef. His predecessor as owner and chef was Leon Ribbens, active in 1972.

In 1979, while digging under the restaurant to create a new wine cellar, labourers found an old cesspool. In it, they found some ceramics. These artefacts were later dated by the Archaeological Institute of the Vrije Universiteit as coming from the Late Middle Ages and the Early modern period.

The restaurant closed down between 1998 and 2003, when it was mentioned as restaurant Promessa.

== See also ==
- List of Michelin starred restaurants in the Netherlands
