= Museum Slager =

Coordinates: 51.6877°N 5.3100°E

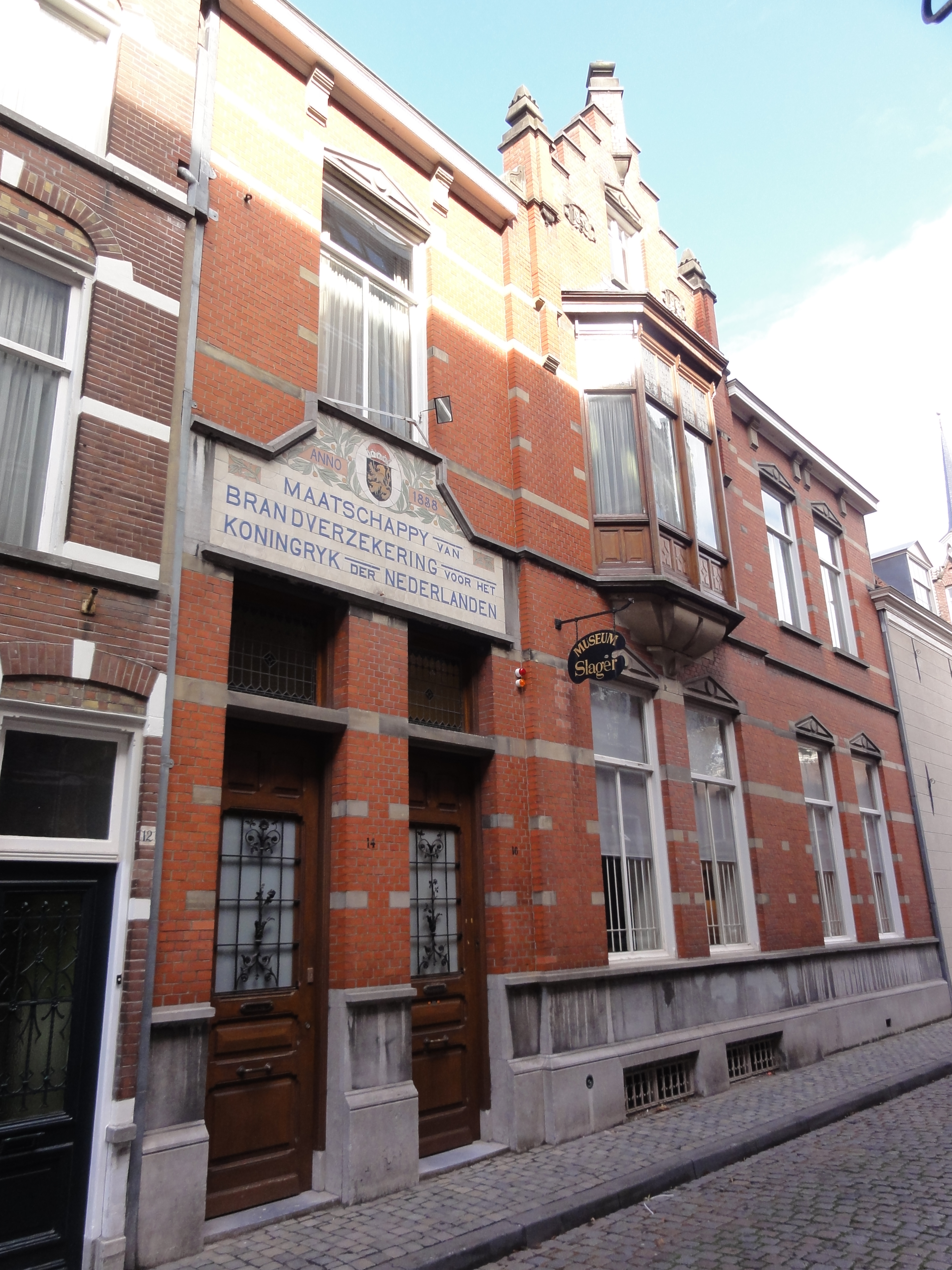
- Established: 1976
- Location: Choorstraat 8 's-Hertogenbosch, Netherlands
- Type: Art museum
- Website: museumslager.com

Museum Slager is an art museum in 's-Hertogenbosch, Netherlands, dedicated to the work of eight local painters from three generations of the Slager family. Behind the distinguished façade of the building there is a collection of paintings, drawings, engravings, watercolours and objects, all directly related to this family of painters. The museum is located at 8 Choorstraat, not far from St. John's Cathedral.

== The Slager Family ==
The founder of the Slager painting dynasty was Petrus Marinus Slager (1841 - 1912). Four of his children, Piet, Frans, Jeannette and Corry, were also artistically gifted and followed in their father's footsteps. Piet and Frans were both married to artists; Piet married Suze Velsen, while Frans married Marie van Gilse. Grandson Tom Slager represented an artistic third generation. With the death of Tom, who had no children, the male line of the Slager family became extinct.

The Slager family also played a prominent role in the cultural life of 's-Hertogenbosch. For years they were involved in the former Koninklijke School (Royal School), the precursor of today's Art Academy in the city. As art teachers, the painters of the Slager family were a source of inspiration to a great many students.

== Collection ==
The three successive generations of the Slager family span the period from the Renaissance Revival to Post-Impressionism. Their works date between 1861 and 1994 in subjects ranging from cityscapes of the old town of 's-Hertogenbosch, village scenes and landscapes of Brabant, the Belgian Campine and southern Europe, to still lifes, flowers and portraits.

Many of the works produced by the family now belong to private collections in the Netherlands or abroad, but public institutions and other museums also own works. Since 1968 the Slager Museum's collection has been managed by the P.M. Slager Foundation. What started out with the legacy bequeathed by Suze Bergé-Slager, the daughter of Piet Slager and Suze Velsen, has grown into a museum whose collections have expanded significantly some fifty years later. The present collection not only contains works by the Slager family, but also by other painters, including Pieter de Josselin de Jong, a former art student of P.M. Slager, and Herman Moerkerk, two artists with strong ties to the province of Brabant.

In addition to exhibitions of works from its own collections, the Slager Museum organizes temporary exhibitions of works by other artists, such as Anton Heyboer in 2014–15. The museum also houses furniture and objects from several periods, immersing visitors in the domestic and artistic atmosphere of the late 19th and early 20th centuries.

== History ==
Located in the historic buildings on 8, 10 and 16 Choorstraat in 's-Hertogenbosch, the Slager Museum is within walking distance of St. John's Cathedral. The museum was opened by Suze Bergé-Slager and Hein Bergé in 1976, within a decade of establishing the P.M. Slager Foundation on 25 October 1968. The aim of the Foundation is to raise the profile of the work of the eight Slager family artists.

The building, which was acquired for the museum in 1975, originally belonged to the Maatschappij van Brandverzekering voor het Koninkrijk der Nederlanden (Fire Insurance Company of the Kingdom of the Netherlands), a company whose name can still be read on a tablet above the entrance. From 1936 the spacious lower floors of the building accommodated the Openbare Leeszaal en Boekerij op R.K. Grondslag (Public Reading Room and Library on Roman Catholic Principles). To mark the opening of this reading room, a special exhibition was organized showing 31 works by P.M. Slager. It was to be the first of many exhibitions mainly devoted to works by artists from 's-Hertogenbosch. When the library moved out of the former Insurance building after some 35 years, the lower floors became vacant.

Since 1959 Mr and Mrs Bergé-Slager had been living in the house above the library and had gradually transformed their home into a museum, filling it with paintings by members of the Slager family. They decided to turn the lower floors into a dedicated museum, and named it after the Slager family as a tribute to its painters, their colleagues and their students.

After a thorough renovation, the Slager Museum opened its doors on 23 April 1976 (the 100th anniversary of Frans Slager's birthday). In 1978 Hein Bergé also bought the adjacent buildings, the former home of the Simons family (mother and sons), from where they once ran both a grocery shop and the famous de Vierkante Meter ('the Square Metre', the tiniest pub in 's-Hertogenbosch, with standing room only). This remarkable museum expansion, with a history all of its own, was opened on 26 November 1987. The last major renovation dates from 2010.

The artistic members of the Slager family, incidentally, never lived in the museum building which now houses their works.
