= ERC =

ERC or Erc may refer to:

== Education ==
- Education and Research Consortium, a US educational organization
- Eleanor Roosevelt College, of the University of California San Diego
- NIOSH Education and Research Centers, of the United States National Institute for Occupational Safety and Health
- Emotion recognition in conversation, a research field to detect emotions from human conversation.

== Games and sports ==
- Component ERA, a baseball statistic
- European Rally Championship
- European Rugby Cup
- FIA European Rallycross Championship

== People ==
- Erc of Dalriada, king of Dál Riata until 474
- Erc of Slane (died 514), Irish saint
- Erc mac Cairpri, a character from the Ulster Cycle

== Science and technology ==
- ERC (software), an IRC client
- Easily recognizable code, in the North American Numbering Plan
- Elastic rail clip, an element of some rail fastening systems
- Electrical rule check
- Electrochemical reduction of carbon dioxide
- Electronics Research Center, a defunct NASA research facility
- Energy release component of a fire
- Epithelial reticular cell
- Epitopoietic Research Corporation - ERC Immunotherapy
- ERMC (cable system), a Eurasian telecommunications system
- Error recovery control
- Ethereum Request for Comments
- European Research Council, a European Union funding body for science
- European Rover Challenge, a robotics competition
- Extrachromosomal rDNA circle
- Eyewall replacement cycle, phenomenon seen in intense tropical cyclones
- Panhard ERC, a French armoured fighting vehicle
- Engineering Research Center, a defunct Western Electric subsidiary in Princeton, New Jersey

== Other uses ==
- ERC (human resources organization), US
- Earnings response coefficient
- Edmund Rice Camps, an Australian children's charity
- Electoral Reform Coalition, in New Zealand
- Ethics Resource Center, US
- European Referendum Campaign, advocating referendums
- European Research Council, European Research Council (ERC)
- European Resuscitation Council, for resuscitation medicine
- Republican Left of Catalonia (Catalan: Esquerra Republicana de Catalunya), a political party in Spain
- East Renfrewshire Council, Scotland
- Employee Retention Credit, a U.S. tax credit
