= Reek, Netherlands =

Reek
- Village
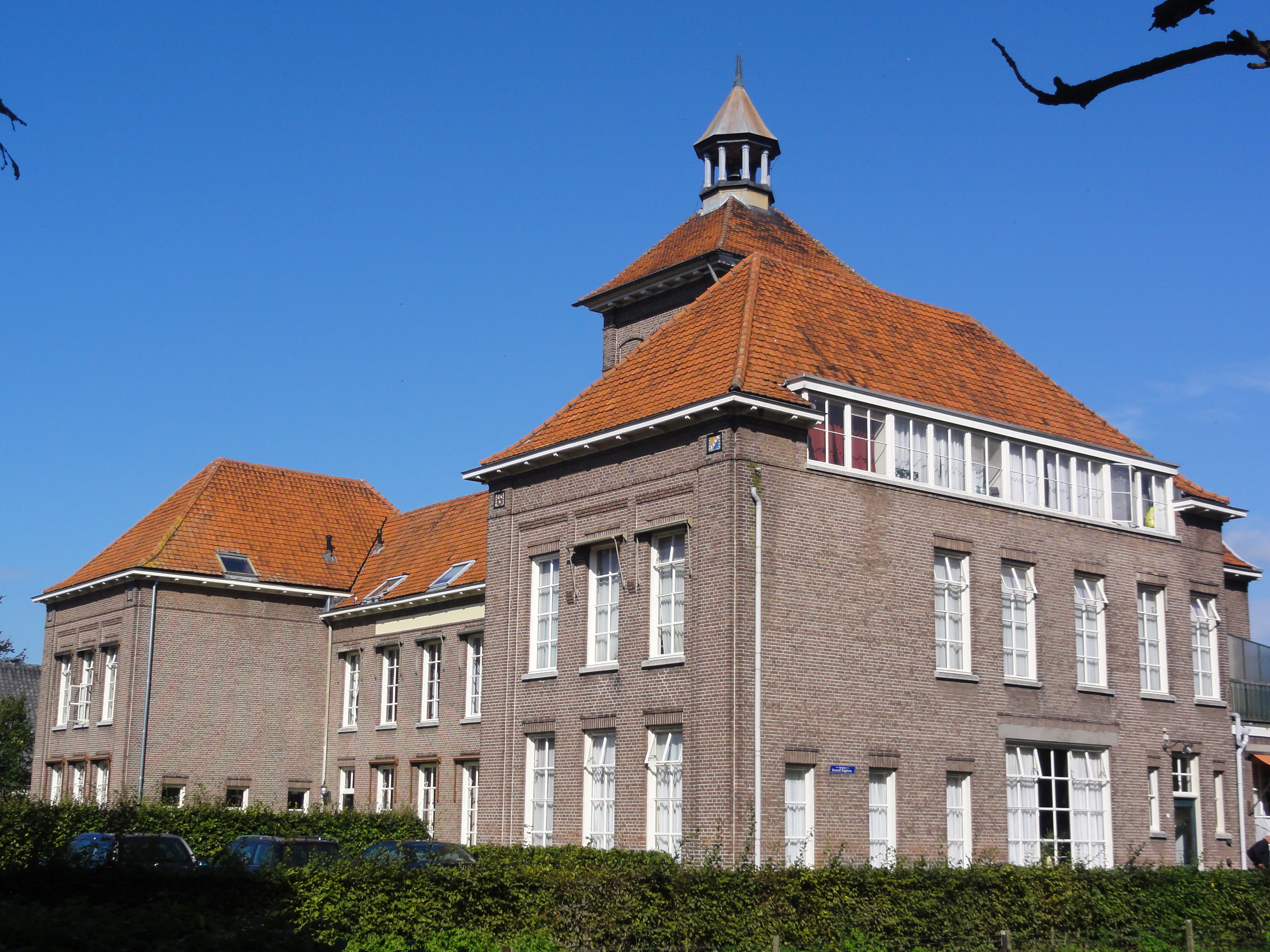
- Former monastery

- Location in the province of North Brabant in the Netherlands Reek (Netherlands)
- Coordinates: 51°44′41″N 5°40′59″E
- Country: Netherlands
- Province: North Brabant
- Municipality: Maashorst

Area
  - Total: 10.39 km^{2} (4.01 sq mi)
- Elevation: 16 m (52 ft)

Population (2021)
  - Total: 1,770
  - Density: 170/km^{2} (441/sq mi)
- Time zone: UTC+1 (CET)
  - Summer (DST): UTC+2 (CEST)
- Postal code: 5375
- Dialing code: 0486

Reek is a village in the Dutch province of North Brabant. It is located in the former municipality of Landerd, about 3 km east of Schaijk.

== History ==
Reek developed as a stretched out village in the Middle Ages. It used to be part of the Land van Ravenstein which became a Catholic enclave of Palatinate-Neuburg within the Dutch Republic in 1631. The land van Ravenstein was conquered by France in 1794, and sold to the Batavian Republic (the predecessor of the Kingdom of the Netherlands) in 1800.

The former nunnery St Elisabeth was founded in 1857 by the Sister Penitenten from Haaren. The St Anthonius Abt Church was built in 1925 and 1926 and has the tower in the corner. It replaced an 1823 church. The grist mill Hellemolen was built in 1832. In 1948, it was put up for sale and the interior and part of the exterior were sold. In 2013, it was bad shape, but bought and restored the next year. By 2016, it could be used again.

Reek was home to 798 people in 1840. Reek was a separate municipality until 1942, when it became part of Schaijk. In 2022, it became part of the new municipality of Maashorst.

The Reekse Heide is a 465 hectares (1,150 acres) nature area. It used to belong to the Ministry of Defence, and consists mainly of sand and forest with some heath.

== Gallery ==
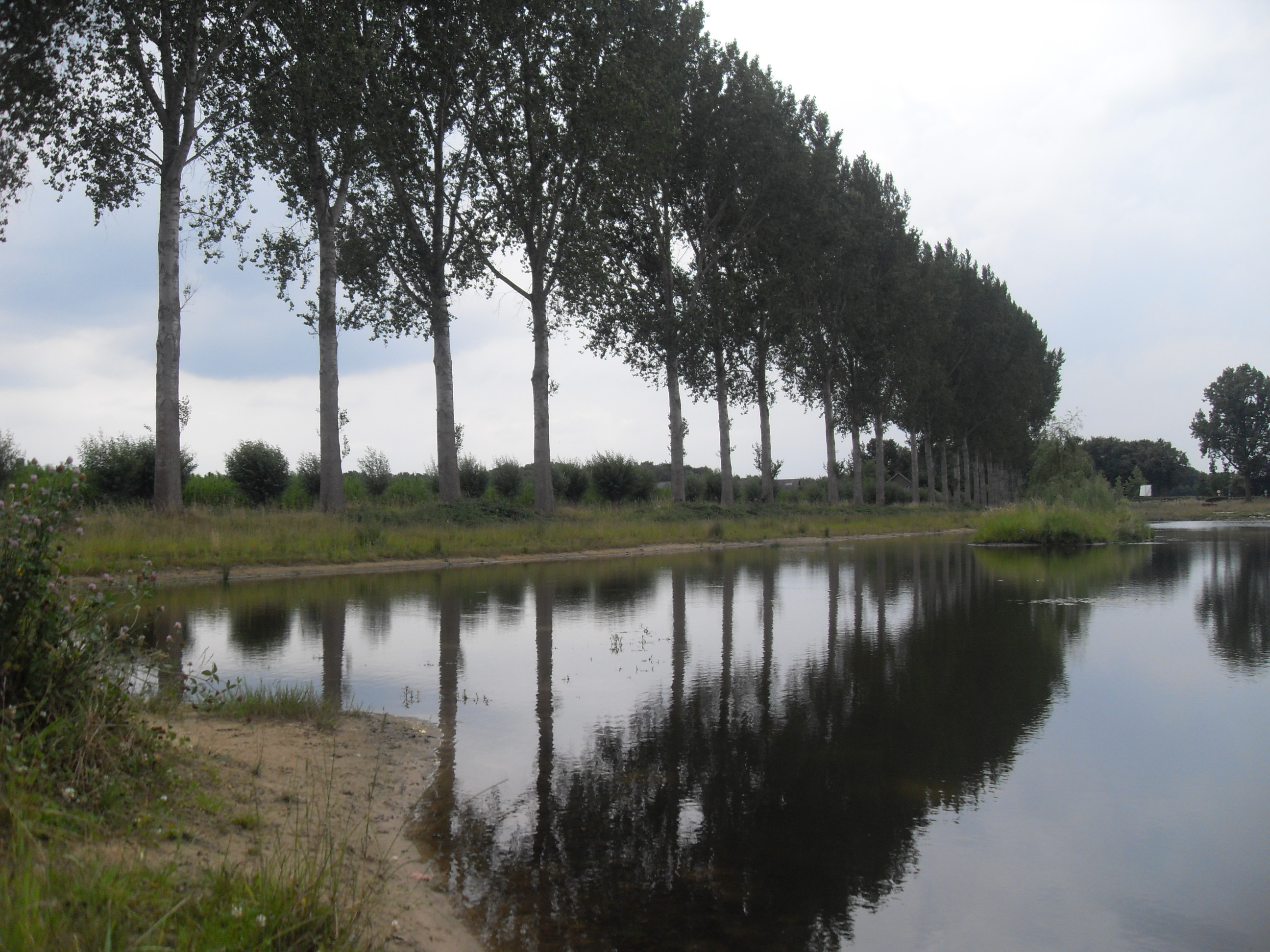
Landscape near Reek

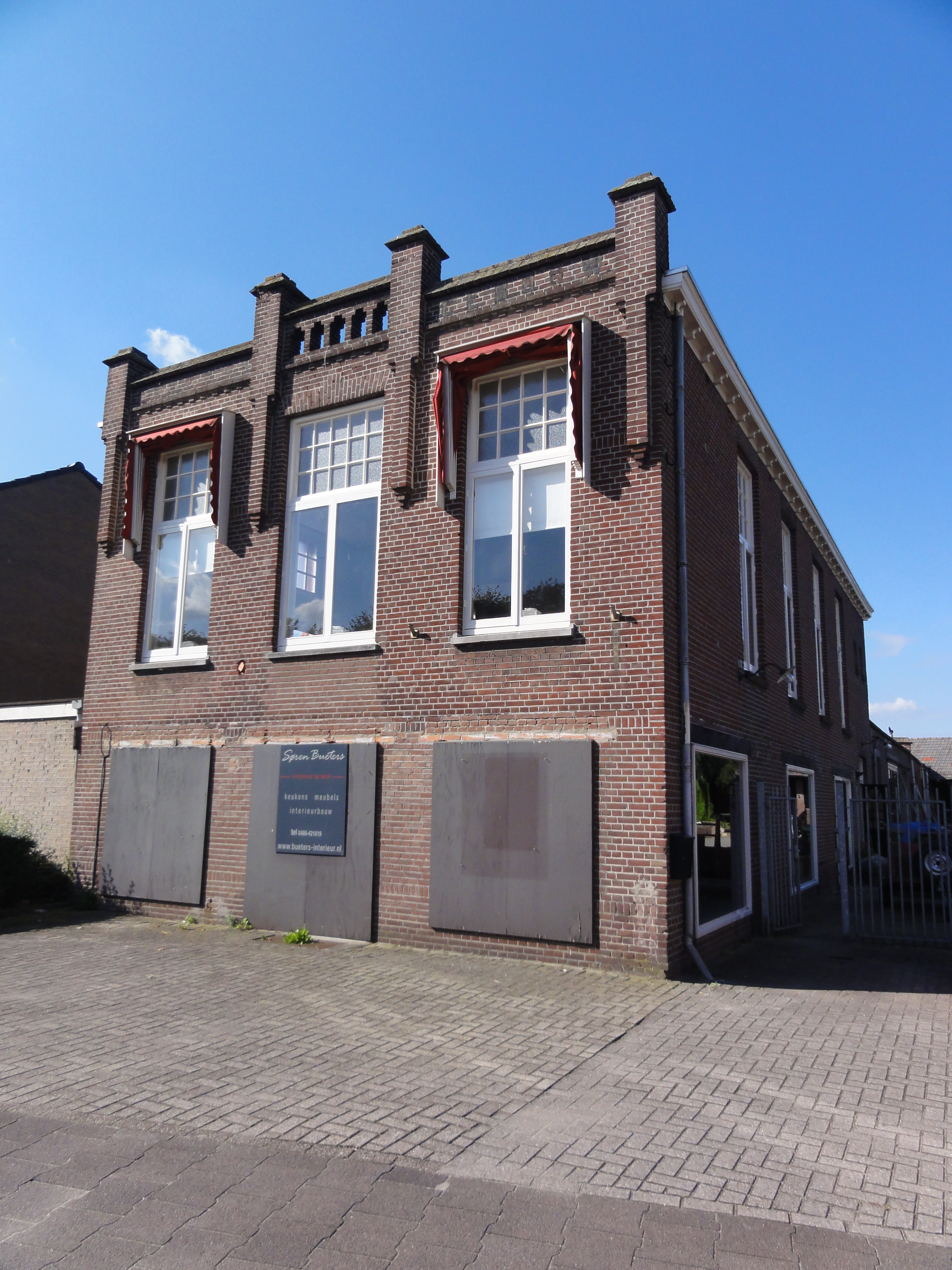
Building of the Noordbrabantse Christelijke Boerenbond

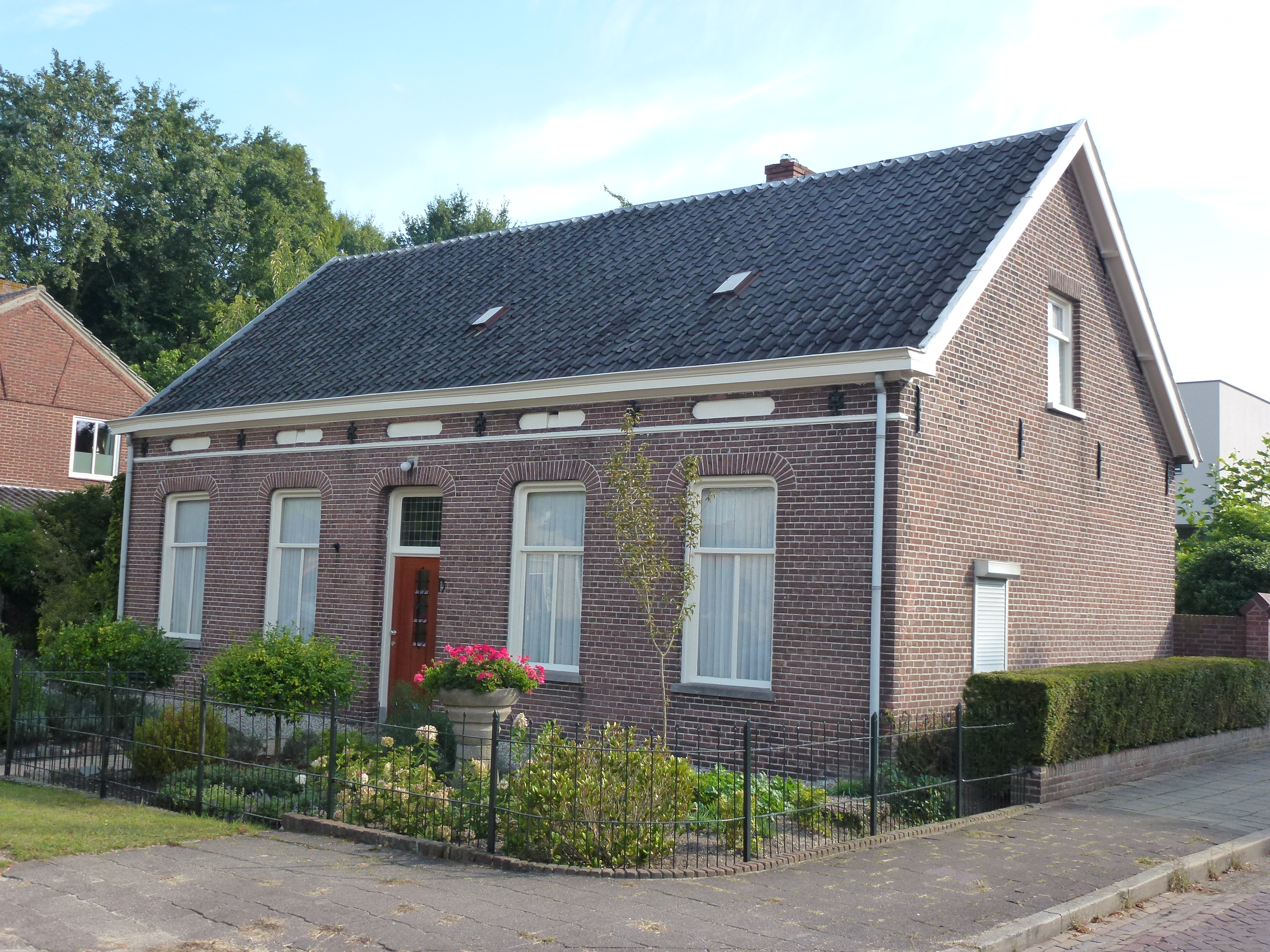
House in Reek

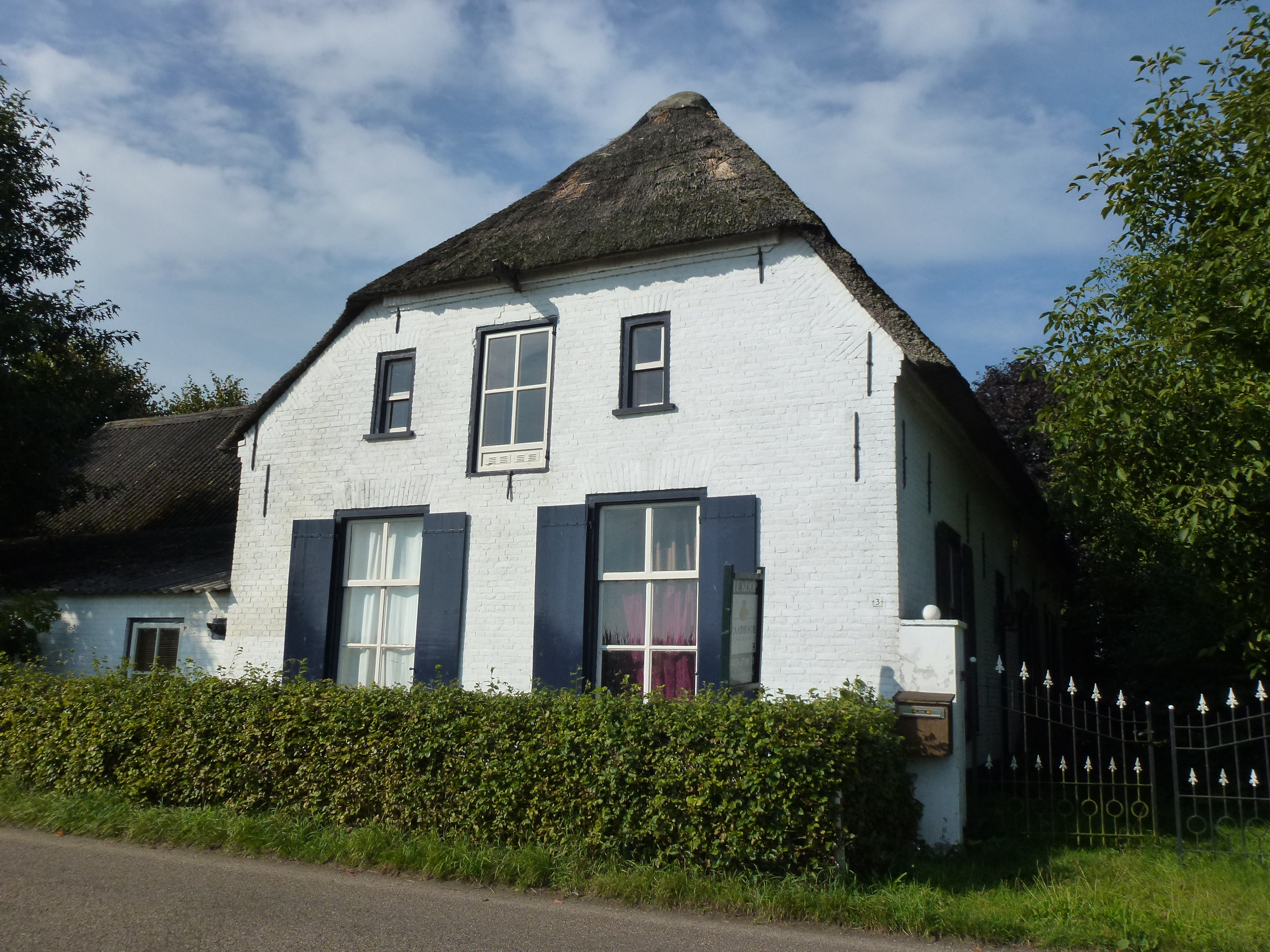
Farm in Reek
