= Nelson Broms =

American business executive (1919–2023)

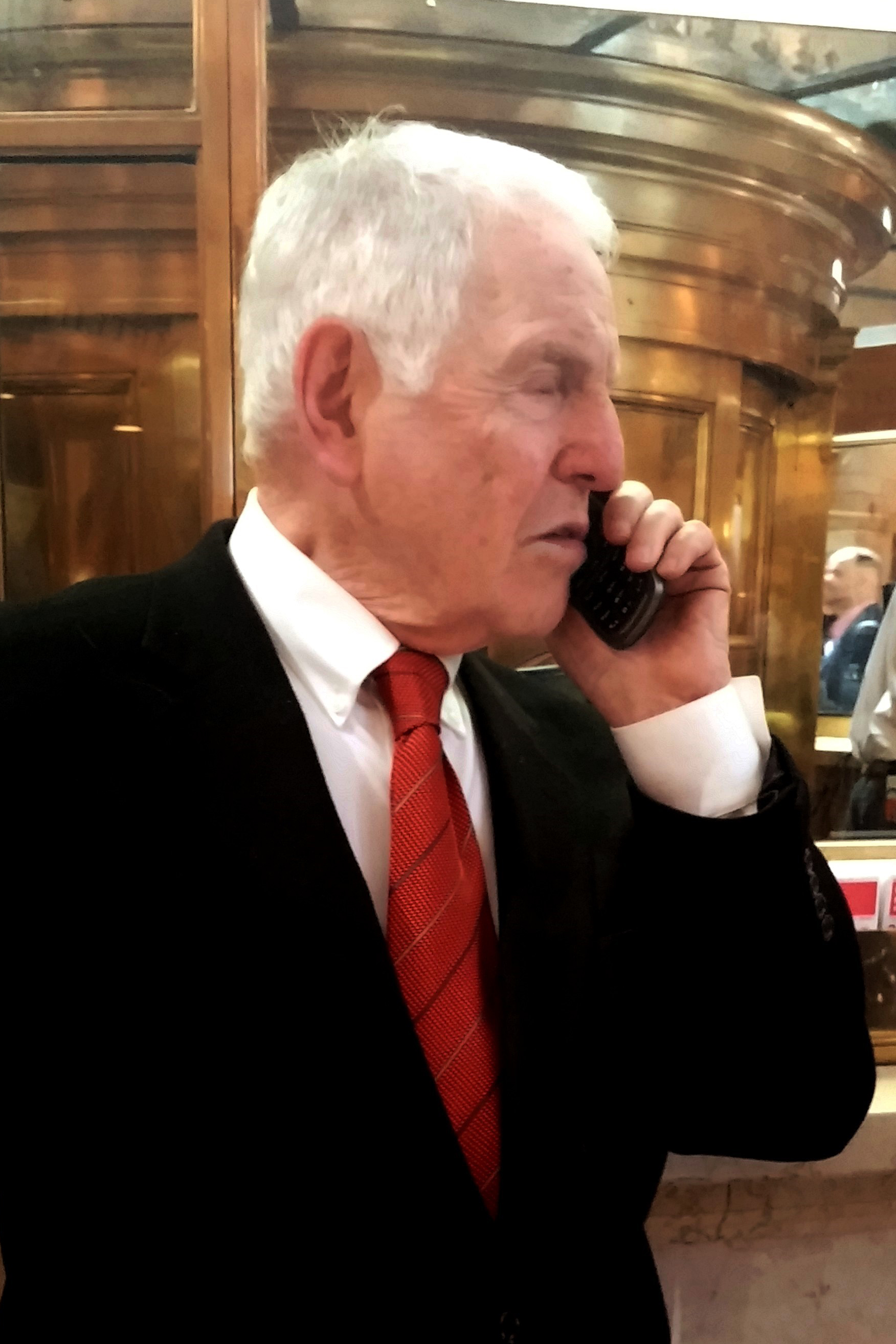
- Born: Nelson Abramowitz; April 15, 1919; New York City, U.S.
- Died: August 13, 2023 (aged 104); Ridgefield, Connecticut, U.S.
- Occupations: Business executive, investor, philanthropist
- Years active: 1945–2023
- Known for: Chairman, CEO and president The Equitable
- Political party: Republican
- Spouses: Selma Zinox (m. 1945; div. 1964); Pearl Tasch (m. 1965)
- Children: 5

Nelson Broms (né Abramowitz; April 15, 1919 – August 13, 2023) was an American business executive, investor, and philanthropist. He worked in financial services, health care, telecommunications, information management and energy. He was chairman, chief executive officer and president of The Equitable Life Holding Corporation. Broms is credited with creating and developing "the demutualization of The Equitable" and the life insurance industry. He turned 100 in April 2019.

== Education and career ==
Broms attended Baruch College, leaving the college in 1940 to enlist in the U.S. Army. He eventually served in Europe as general staff officer in Third Army Headquarters, and as assistant G-1 in the headquarters of the Ninth United States Army. He spent seven years in active service, including the Korean War, and was awarded the Bronze Star Medal in 1945.

After the war, an uncle invited him to join his life insurance agency where Broms achieved early success selling group coverage. He left to establish the Nelson Broms Company Inc. in 1956. In 1960, Broms' firm created a new type of life insurance policy to be purchased by apartment building owners in New York. The policies covered tenants, guaranteeing landlords that a deceased tenant's rent would continue to be paid, and allowing the tenant's family to avoid losing the lease.

In 1971, Broms was asked to join The Equitable Life Assurance Society of the United States (later part of AXA Equitable Life Insurance Company) as a member of senior management, and served for 14 years in leadership roles including chief strategy officer and chief marketing officer (a position he created), culminating in his service as president and chief executive officer (six years), and chairman (three years) of The Equitable Life Holding Corporation. Broms led efforts to divest the company of international partners to focus on U.S. operations, and to secure regulatory approval for the demutualization—the conversion from mutual ownership to stock ownership—of The Equitable. Within 10 years, firms such as Prudential, Metropolitan Life, John Hancock and Principal followed The Equitable's example.

Broms was instrumental in the formation and development of the financial services and managed healthcare sectors in the United States. He left The Equitable in 1983 to become a partner of the leveraged buyout management company, Clayton & Dubilier (later Clayton, Dubilier & Rice), one of the oldest and largest private equity investment firms in the world.

Broms co-founded and served as vice chairman of Financial Security Assurance, the financial guaranty (or monoline) insurance company which pioneered insuring securitized asset-backed securities with AAA credit. He was personally instrumental in arranging $234 million of equity funding from U.S. and international institutional investors. Broms served as vice chairman until 2000, when FSA was sold to Dexia Group for $2.6 billion.

In 1982, Broms co-founded with Anthony M. Frank First Nationwide Bank, the first U.S. bank created by aggregating savings and loan companies.

Broms was a member of the board of directors of Contel Inc., serving as a member of the strategic planning committee and chairing the audit committee until the 1991 merger with GTE Corporation. The merger resulted in a $6.6 billion cash purchase price. Many of the cellular properties included in the transfer became the core of Verizon wireless communications. In 1992, Broms joined the board of directors of Covenant Investment Management Inc. in Chicago. That same year, Covenant created The Covenant Portfolio, a diversified mutual fund focused on investment in socially responsible U.S. companies.

Broms was a senior adviser to the chief executive of UtiliCorp United, a provider of electricity and natural gas distribution and operator of power generation assets, that ranked as high as 33rd on the Fortune 500. In 2002 he was named senior adviser to Barry Sloane, chairman and CEO of Newtek Capital Inc. He served as a founding board member at Preferred Healthcare Ltd., the first managed mental health care company in the U.S. He served as a board member of MacGregor Sporting Goods Inc, and of Primark Inc. Primark, a global provider of financial, economic and market-research information, merged with Thomson Corp. for $842 million in cash plus the assumption of $235 million of debt.

== Philanthropies and community service ==
In 1965, Broms endowed the Nelson Broms Chair in Private Enterprise at Hofstra University on Long Island, New York.

In 1976, Broms served as an adviser to Daniel Patrick Moynihan (Democrat) during his campaign for U.S. Senate. In 1980, Moynihan authored the book, "Counting Our Blessings; Reflections on the Future of America", in which he scripted, "Nelson Broms is one of our blessings".

Along with William J. Casey (Director of Central Intelligence from 1981 to 1987) Broms co-founded the Manhattan Institute for Policy Research, Inc., where he remained a director emeritus. He was a co-founder and director of the Ethics Resource Center in Washington, D.C., and served as co-chairman of the Council on Economics and National Security for the National Strategy Information Center.

Broms was a founder of Stamford Theatre Works in Stamford, Connecticut; served as an adviser to the founder of the National Museum of Women in the Arts in Washington, D.C.; and was a board member of the Spoleto Festival USA in Charleston, South Carolina.

Broms was a member of the board of advisers for Distinctive charter schools, and a member of the board of directors for Great Hearts Academies nonprofit charter schools and Harlem's Family Academy. He was the co-founder, initial financial supporter and founding board chairman of Latino Educational Equity Partnerships. He participated in the group that took Edison Schools private, and served as an adviser to senior members of Edison's management. In that role, he created an innovative partnership with Reasoning Mind to improve elementary school mathematics instruction in Edison's schools in St. Louis, Missouri using a computer-based curriculum.

During the last 28 years of his life, Broms served as strategic adviser to Michael Crow, president of Arizona State University, beginning when Crow was at Iowa State University, followed by Columbia University, and now at Arizona State University.

== Death ==
Broms died in Ridgefield, Connecticut, on August 13, 2023, at the age of 104.

== Honors and awards ==
In 1945, Broms received the Bronze Star Medal for heroic service and meritorious achievement in the U.S. Army. In 2002, he was awarded an Honorary Doctor of Letters degree from Sacred Heart University in Fairfield, Connecticut. He served as a distinguished visiting entrepreneur at Columbia University. In 2012, ASU awarded Broms its University Medal of Excellence.
