= Uden-Veghel =

- Metropolitan region
- Stedelijke regio Uden-Veghel
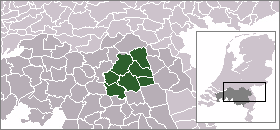
- Coordinates: 51°38′17″N 5°34′09″E
- Country: Netherlands
- Province: North Brabant
- Largest municipalities: Maashorst; Meierijstad
- Other municipalities: Bernheze, Boekel

Area
  - Metro region: 428.04 km^{2} (165.27 sq mi)
  - Land: 425.21 km^{2} (164.17 sq mi)
  - Water: 2.83 km^{2} (1.09 sq mi)
  - Urban: 40.58 km^{2} (15.67 sq mi)

Population (Metro region, January 2014; Urban area, January 2010)
  - Metro region: 161,900
  - Density: 381/km^{2} (990/sq mi)
  - Urban: 94,215
  - Urban density: 2,322/km^{2} (6,010/sq mi)

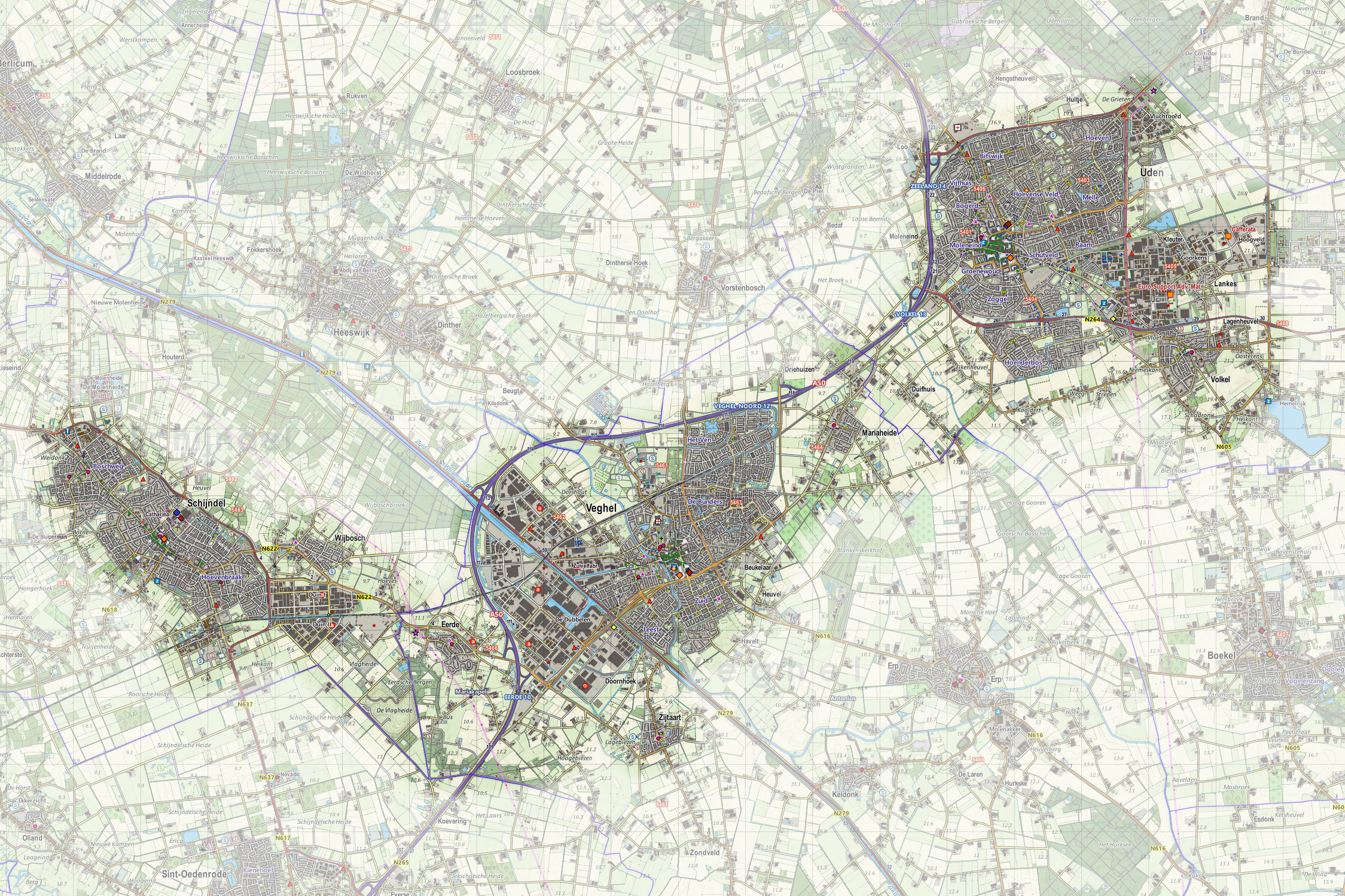
Uden–Veghel–Schijndel urban area in 2013 (Note: Uden–Veghel–Schijndel urban area Combined built-up area of Uden, Veghel and Schijndel, with adjacent commuter towns and business parks, forming a continuous urban and industrially developed area. The outer rural areas aren't included.)

Uden-Veghel is a polycentric metropolitan area, centred on the towns of Uden and Veghel, in the east of the province of North Brabant in the southern Netherlands. It consists of the neighbouring municipalities of Maashorst (merger of Uden and Landerd in 2022) and Meierijstad (merger of Schijndel, Sint-Oedenrode, and Veghel in 2017) with the surrounding municipalities of Bernheze and Boekel.

The province of North Brabant established the partnership in 2002 for spatial planning purposes, and stated that the municipalities of Uden and Veghel are complementary to each other. The agreement included zoning plans for the development of residential, business and industrial areas, as well as plans for the development and preservation of nature in the region.

The provincie of North Brabant defines the chain of Schijndel-Eerde-Veghel and Uden-Volkel as highly urbanized. The municipalities of Sint-Oedenrode and Landerd are described as being moderately urbanized, and Erp, Boekel and Bernheze are considered to be rural.

Population figures and facts of Uden-Veghel (2010)
Municipality	Population	Jobs	Companies
Uden	40,536	22,221	2,900
Veghel	37,303	28,602	2,727
Schijndel	22,991	10,041	1,738
Sint-Oedenrode	17,680	5,997	1,403
Bernheze	29,655	10,168	2,150
Landerd	14,888	6,233	1,117
Boekel	9,772	3,925	802
Total:	172,825	79,638	12,837

(source: CBS, Gemeente op Maat)

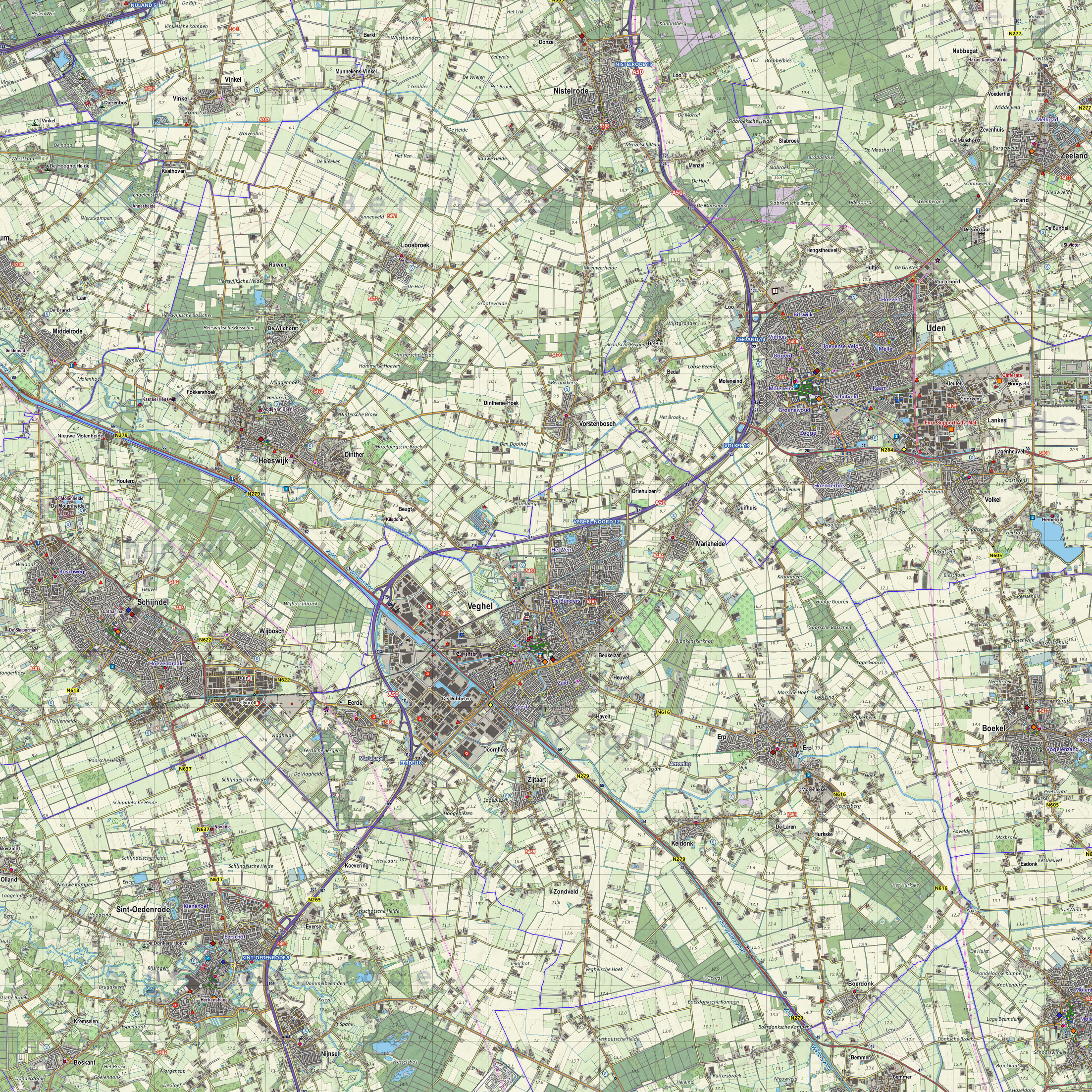
Topographic map of the Uden–Veghel metropolitan region, 2013
