= ERCS =

ERCS may refer to:

- AN/DRC-8 Emergency Rocket Communications System
- Eagle Ridge Christian School, in Cape Girardeau, Missouri
- East Richland Christian Schools, in St. Clairsville, Ohio
- Emissions Reduction Currency System
- Ethiopian Red Cross Society
- Extended Reference Concrete Syntax

== See also ==
- ERC (disambiguation)
