= Schaijk =

- Town
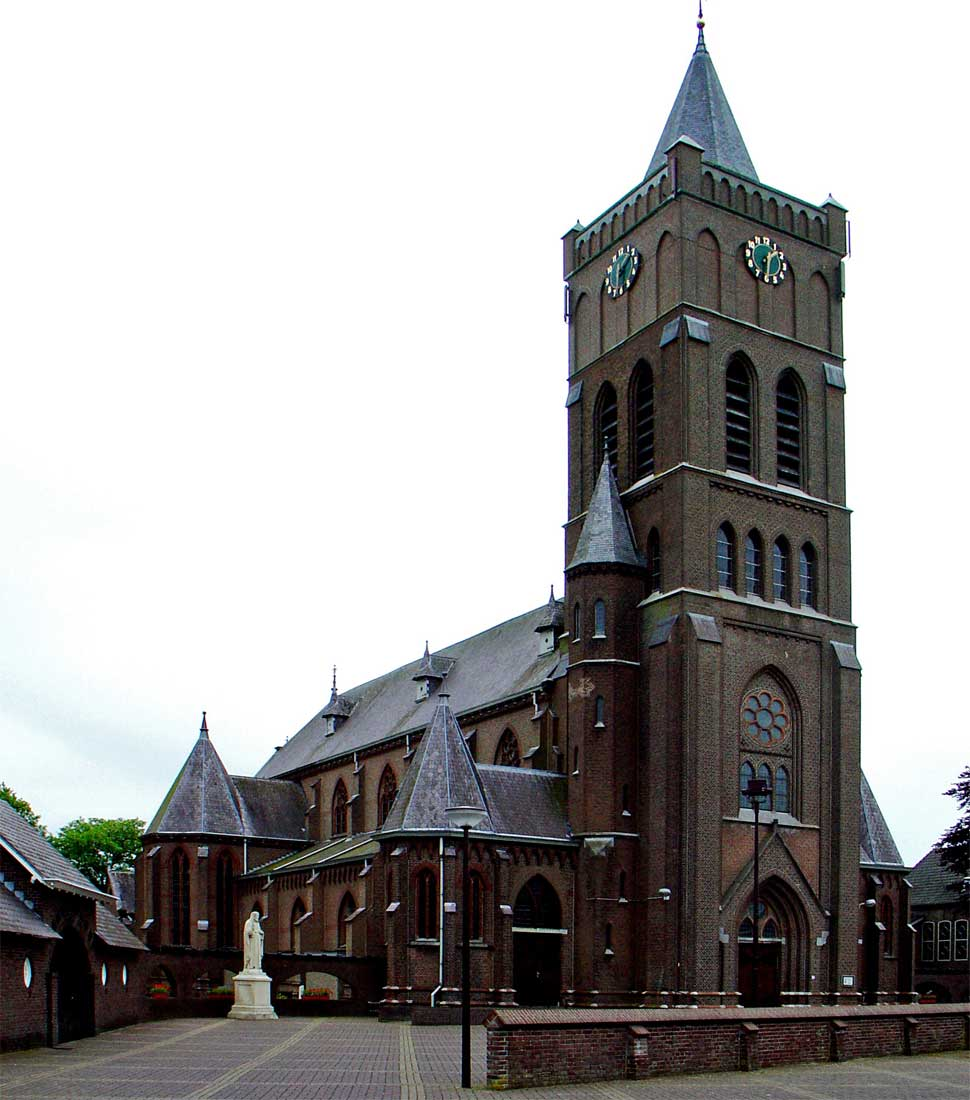
- Church of H. Antonius Abt in Schaijk

- Location in the province of North Brabant in the Netherlands Schaijk (Netherlands)
- Coordinates: 51°44′41″N 5°37′51″E
- Country: Netherlands
- Province: North Brabant
- Municipality: Maashorst

Area
  - Total: 30.56 km^{2} (11.80 sq mi)
- Elevation: 11 m (36 ft)

Population (2021)
  - Total: 7,315
  - Density: 239.4/km^{2} (620.0/sq mi)
- Time zone: UTC+1 (CET)
  - Summer (DST): UTC+2 (CEST)
- Postal code: 5374
- Dialing code: 0486

Schaijk is a town in the Dutch province of North Brabant. It is located in the municipality of Maashorst, about 8 kilometres (5.0 mi) southeast of Oss. Schaijk used to be part of the former municipality of Landerd.

== History ==
Schaijk developed in the Middle Ages on the border of the sand and clay land. It was part of the Land van Ravenstein which became a Catholic enclave of Palatinate-Neuburg within the Dutch Republic in 1631. The Land van Ravenstein was conquered by France in 1794, and sold to the Batavian Republic (the predecessor of the Kingdom of the Netherlands) in 1800.

The St Antonius Abt Church was built between 1894 and 1895 to replace the medieval church. Between 1901 and 1902, a new wall was built around the 15th-century tower and the tower was enlarged.

Schaijk was home to 536 people in 1840. Schaijk was a separate municipality until 1994, when it merged with Zeeland to form the new municipality of Landerd. Since 2022 it has been part of the new municipality of Maashorst.

Schaijk is known for its carnival, called "moeslands carnaval". During carnival, The name changes from Schaijk to Moesland, which loosely translates into "Kale-land".

== Gallery ==
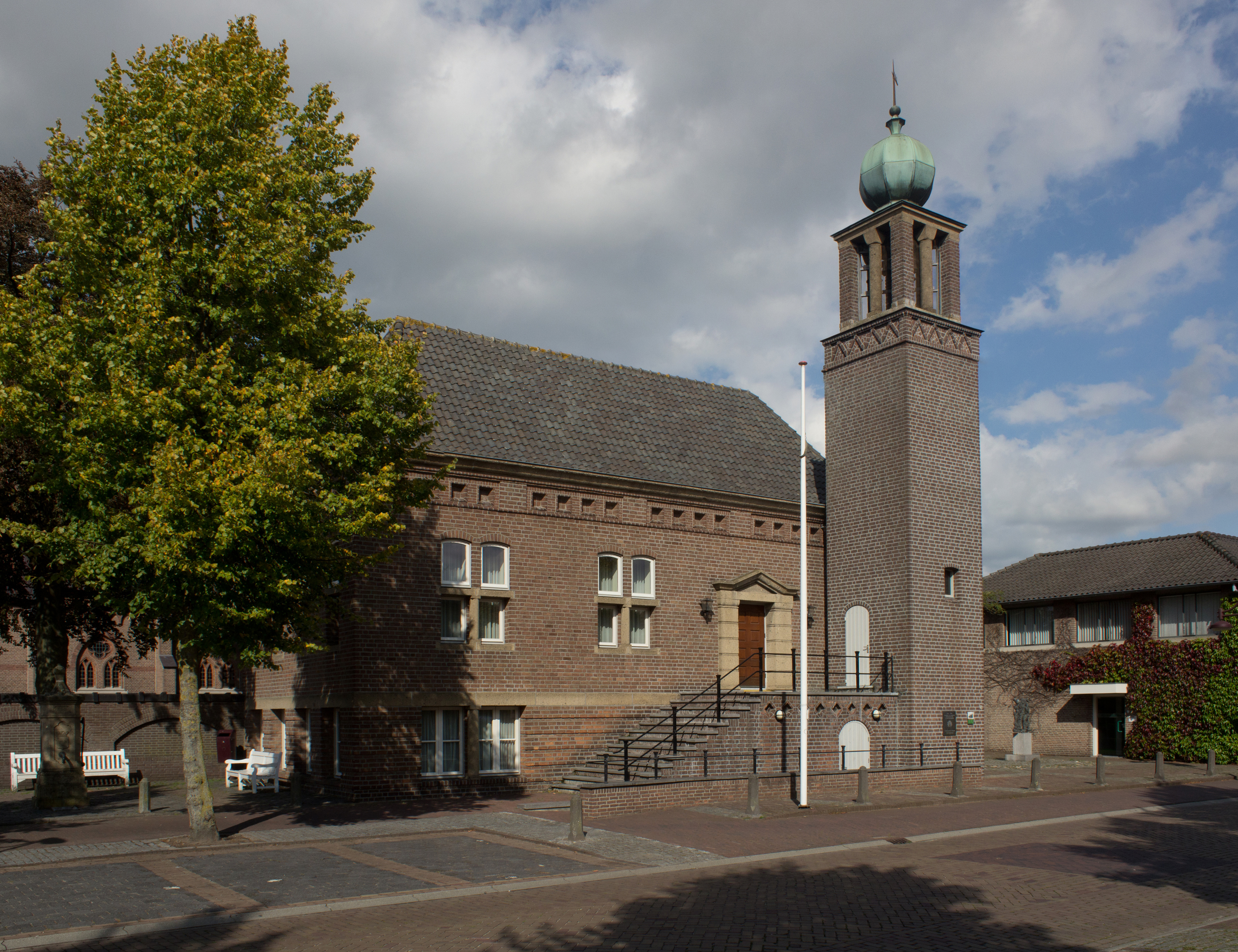
Former town hall

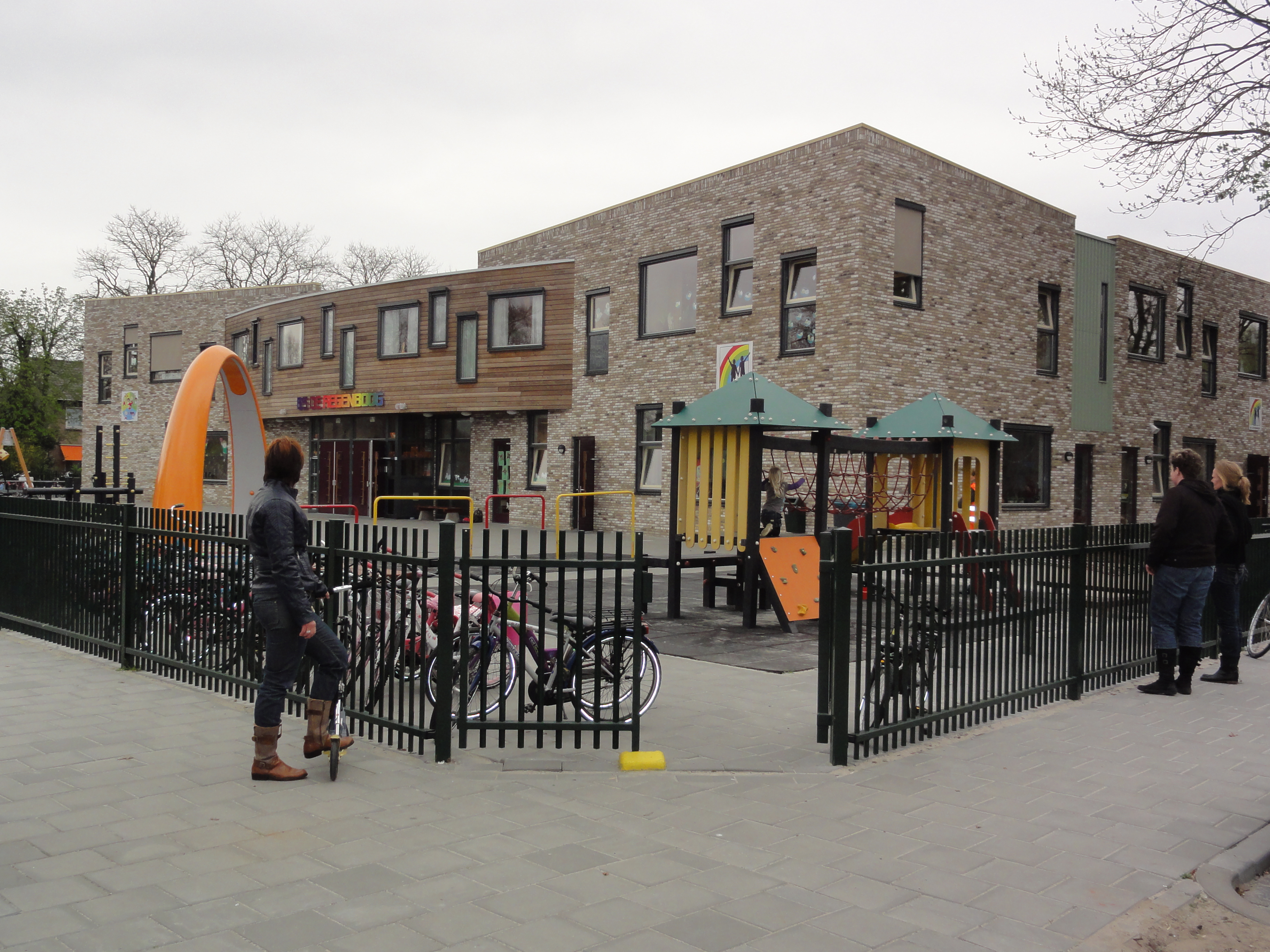
School

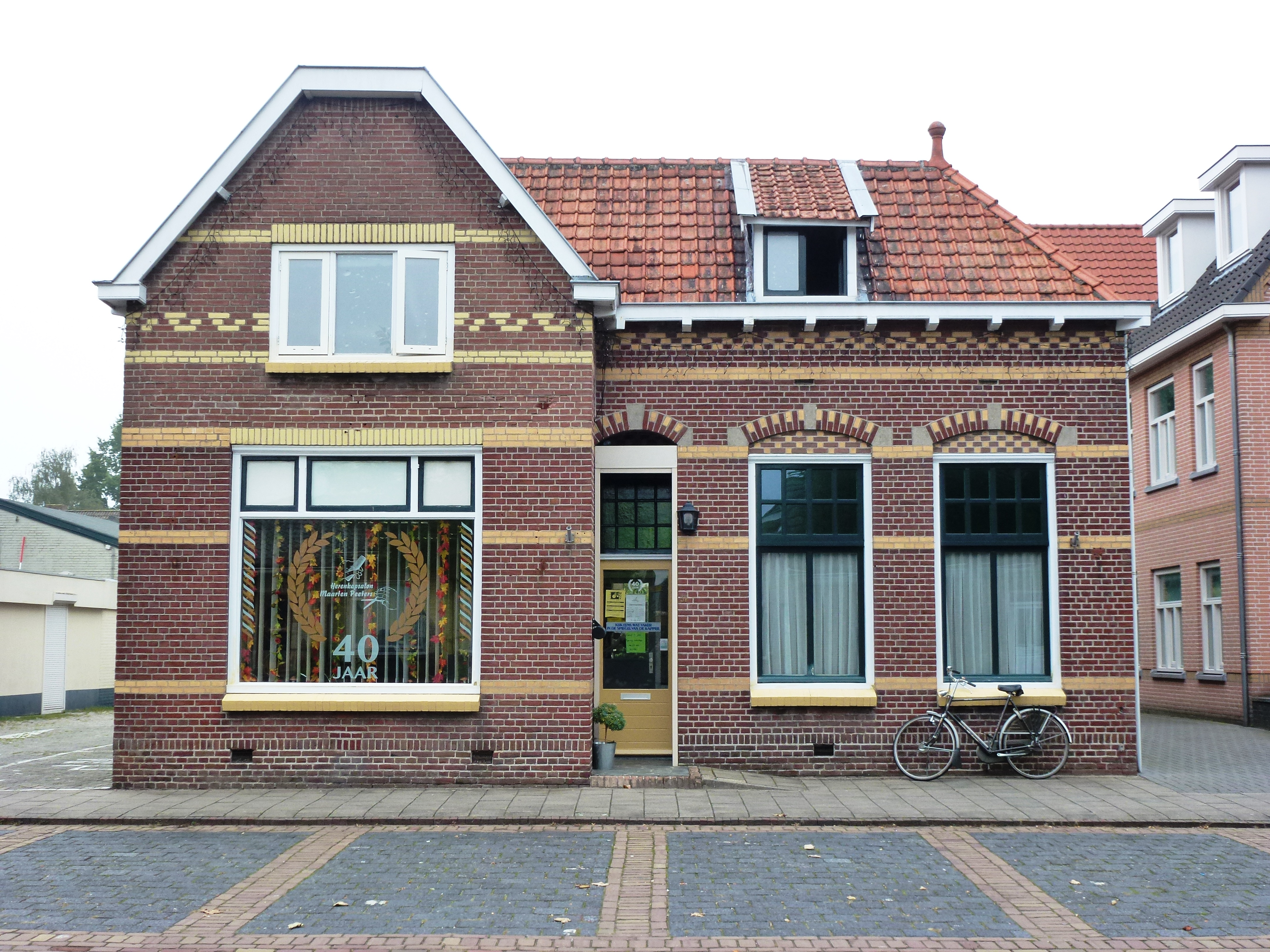
Shop in Schaijk

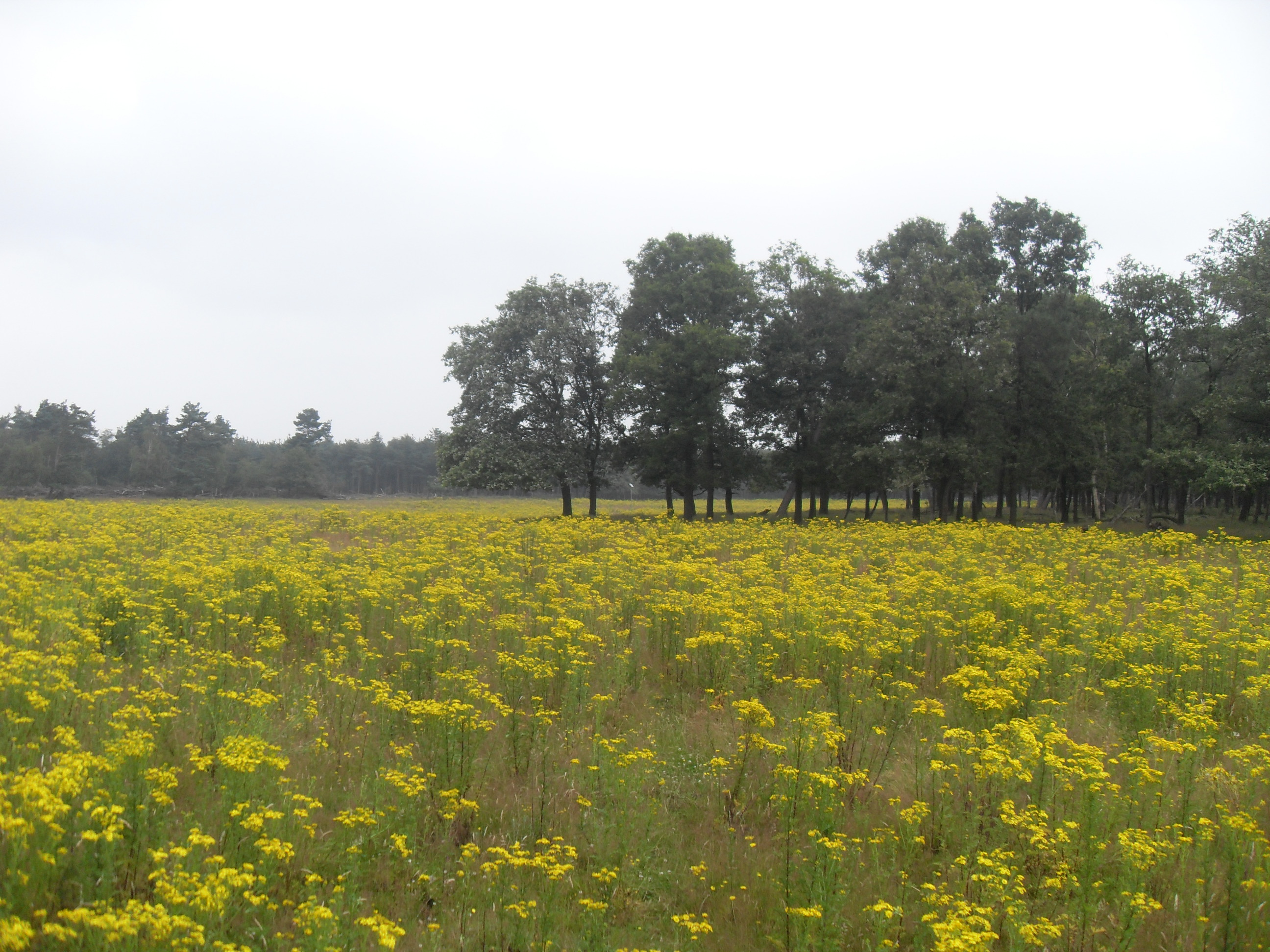
Heath near Schaijk
