= Landerd =

- Former municipality
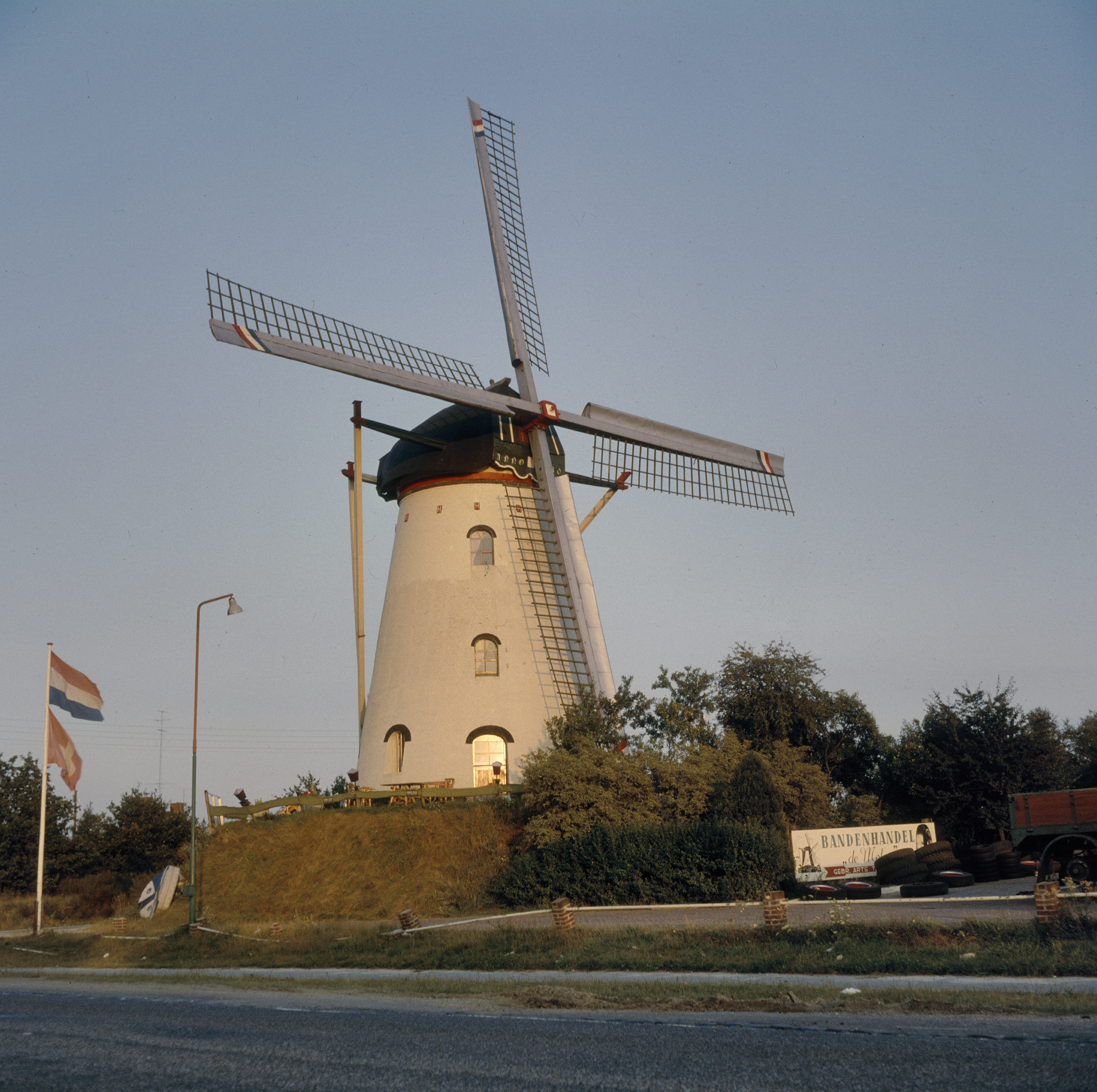
- Windmill in Reek

- Flag Coat of arms

- Location of the former municipality of Landerd in North Brabant
- Coordinates: 51°42′N 5°40′E
- Country: Netherlands
- Province: North Brabant
- Municipality: Maashorst
- Established: 1 January 1994
- Disestablished: 1 January 2022

Area
  - Total: 70.71 km^{2} (27.30 sq mi)
  - Land: 70.35 km^{2} (27.16 sq mi)
  - Water: 0.36 km^{2} (0.14 sq mi)
- Elevation: 20 m (66 ft)

Population (January 2021)
  - Total: 15,817
  - Density: 225/km^{2} (580/sq mi)
  - Uden-Veghel: 175,119
- Time zone: UTC+1 (CET)
  - Summer (DST): UTC+2 (CEST)
- Postcode: 5374–5375, 5410–5411
- Area code: 0486
- Website: www.landerd.nl

Landerd (Dutch pronunciation: [ˈlɑndərt]) is a former municipality within the province of North Brabant in the southern Netherlands. Since 2022 it has been part of the new municipality of Maashorst.

== History ==
Landerd is the result of a merger between the formerly independent municipalities of Schaijk and Zeeland on 1 January 1994. Schaijk and Reek had merged earlier on 1 July 1942.

== Population centres ==
- Reek
- Schaijk
- Zeeland

== Topography ==
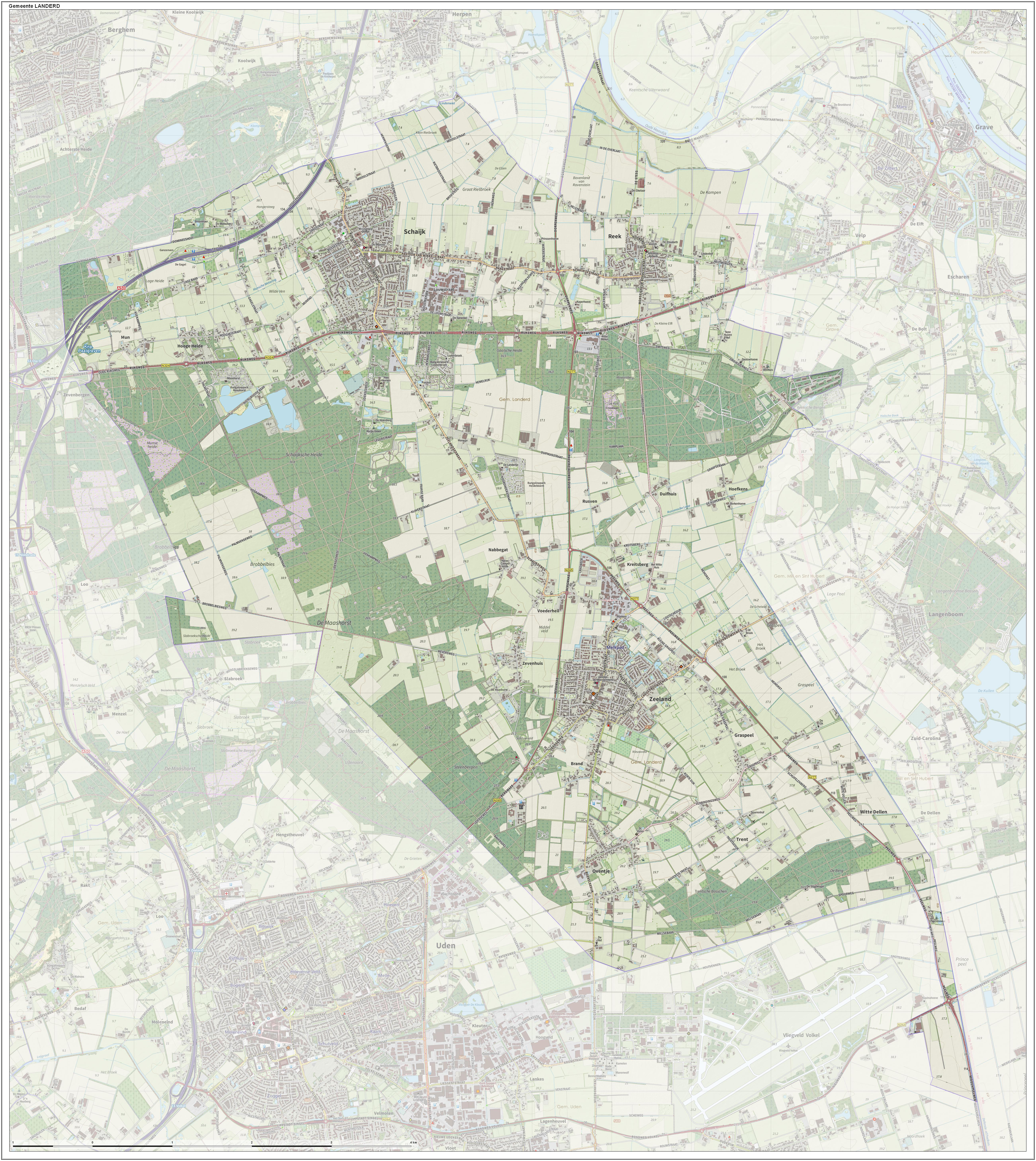

Map of the former municipality of Landerd, 2015

== Notable people ==
- Monique van de Ven (born 1952 in Zeeland) a Dutch actress and director
- Tonnie Dirks (born 1961 in Zeeland) a Dutch former long-distance runner, competed in the 1992 Summer Olympics
- Daphny van den Brand (born 1978 in Zeeland) a Dutch cyclo-cross, road bicycle and mountain bike racer.
- Thijs Ploegmakers (born 1980 in Schaijk) performs as Adaro, is a Dutch DJ.

== Gallery ==
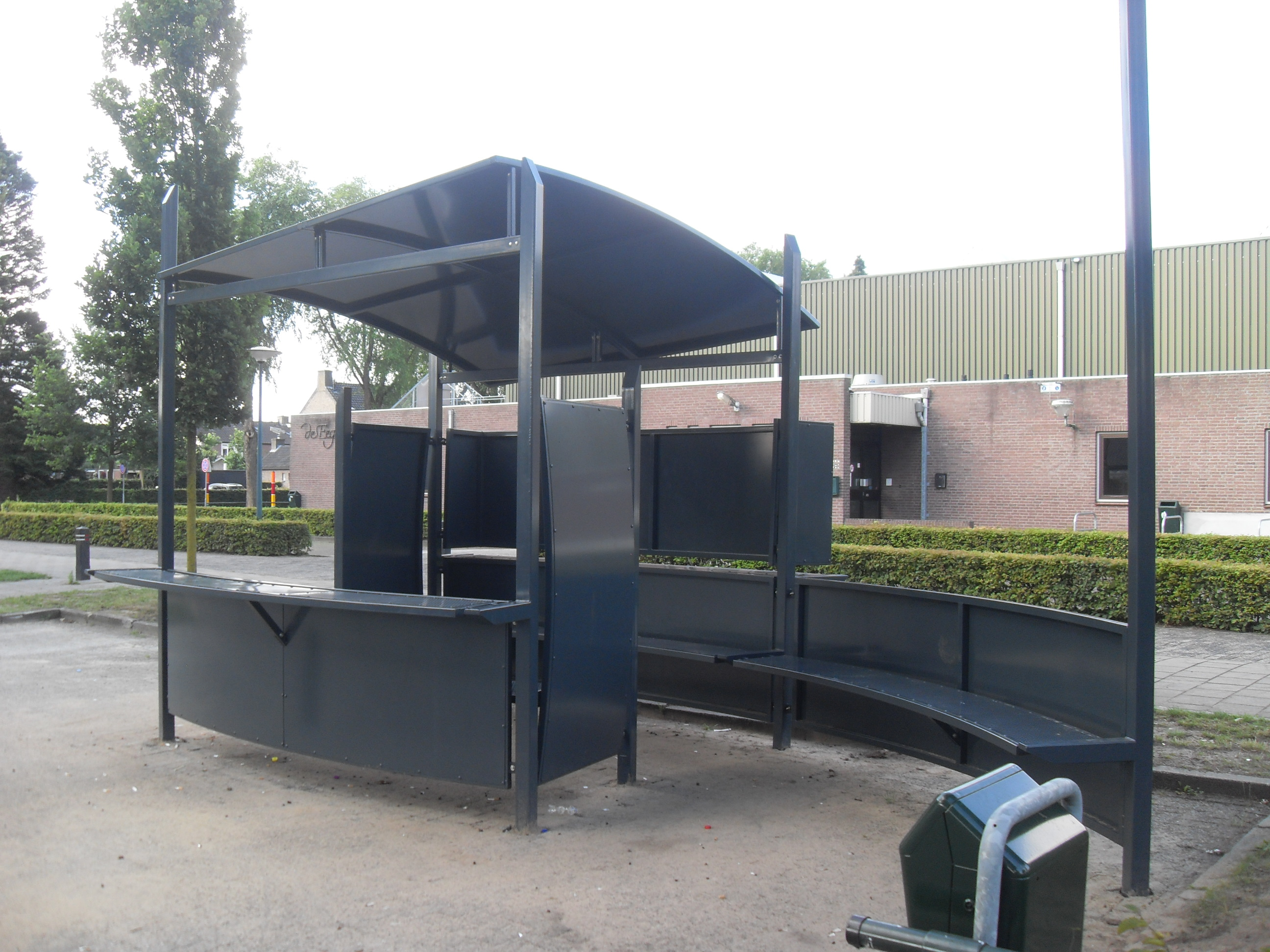
Trefpunt - panoramio

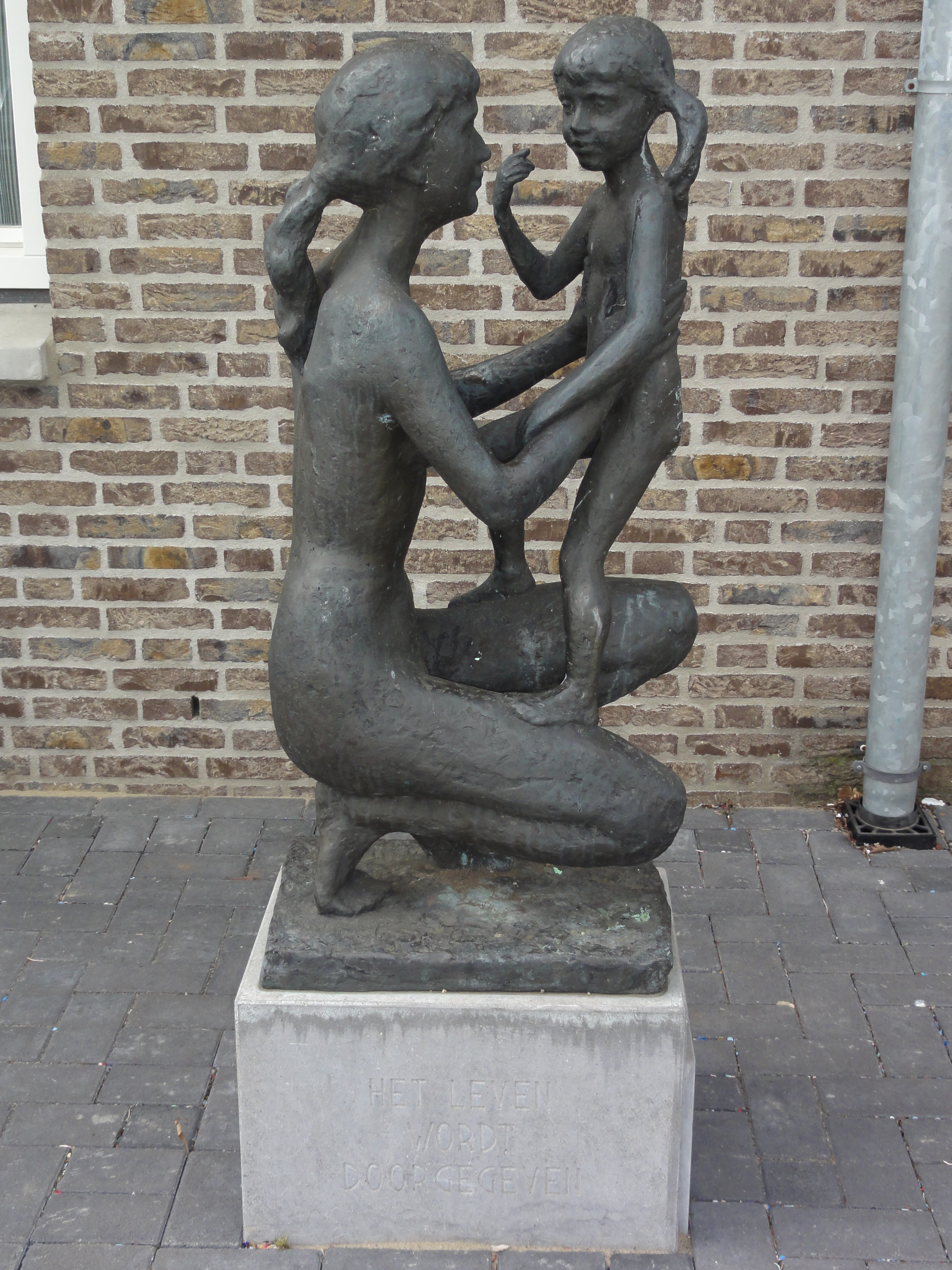
Reek (Landerd) Het Wapen van Reek

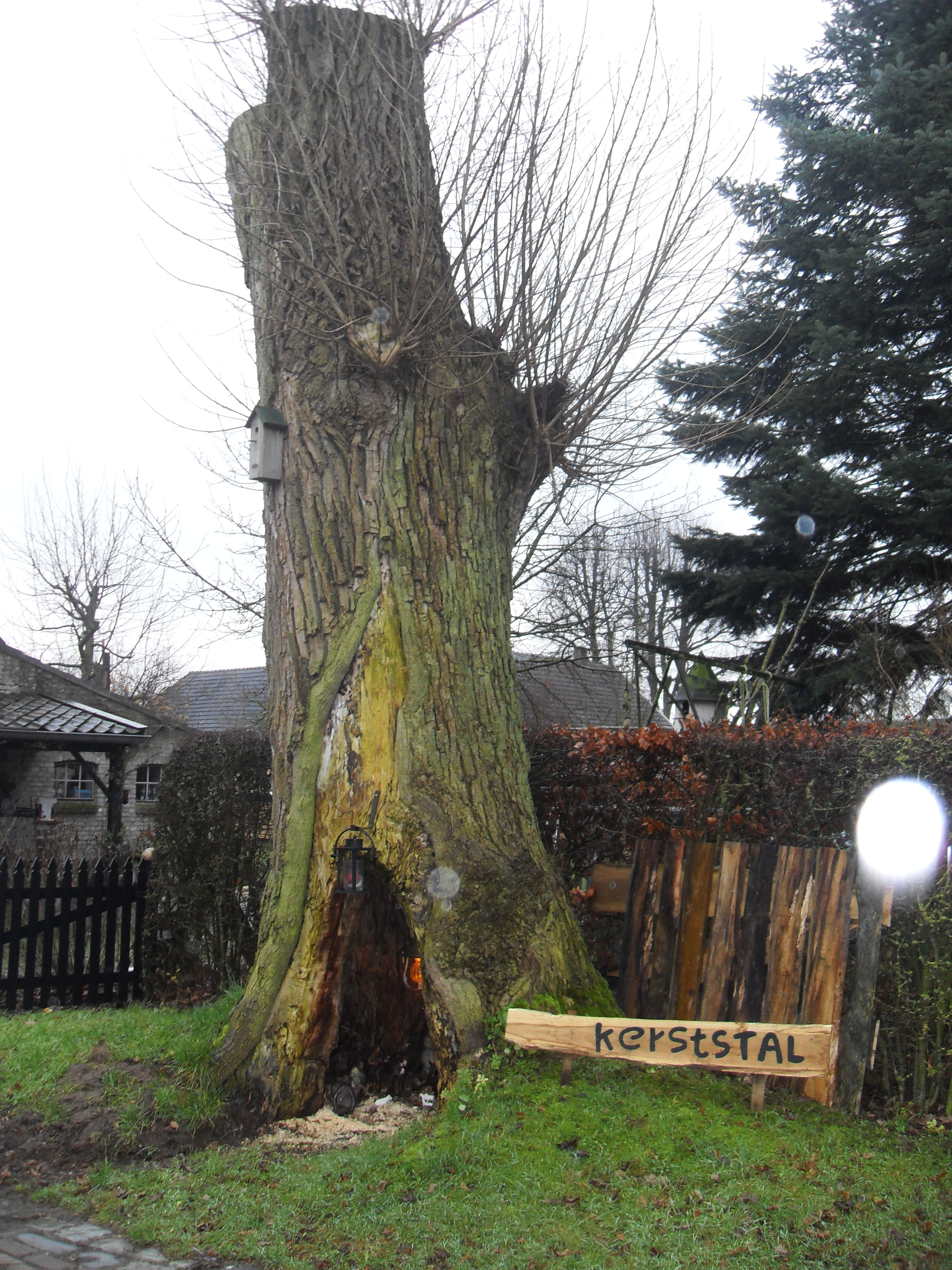
Kerststal - panoramio

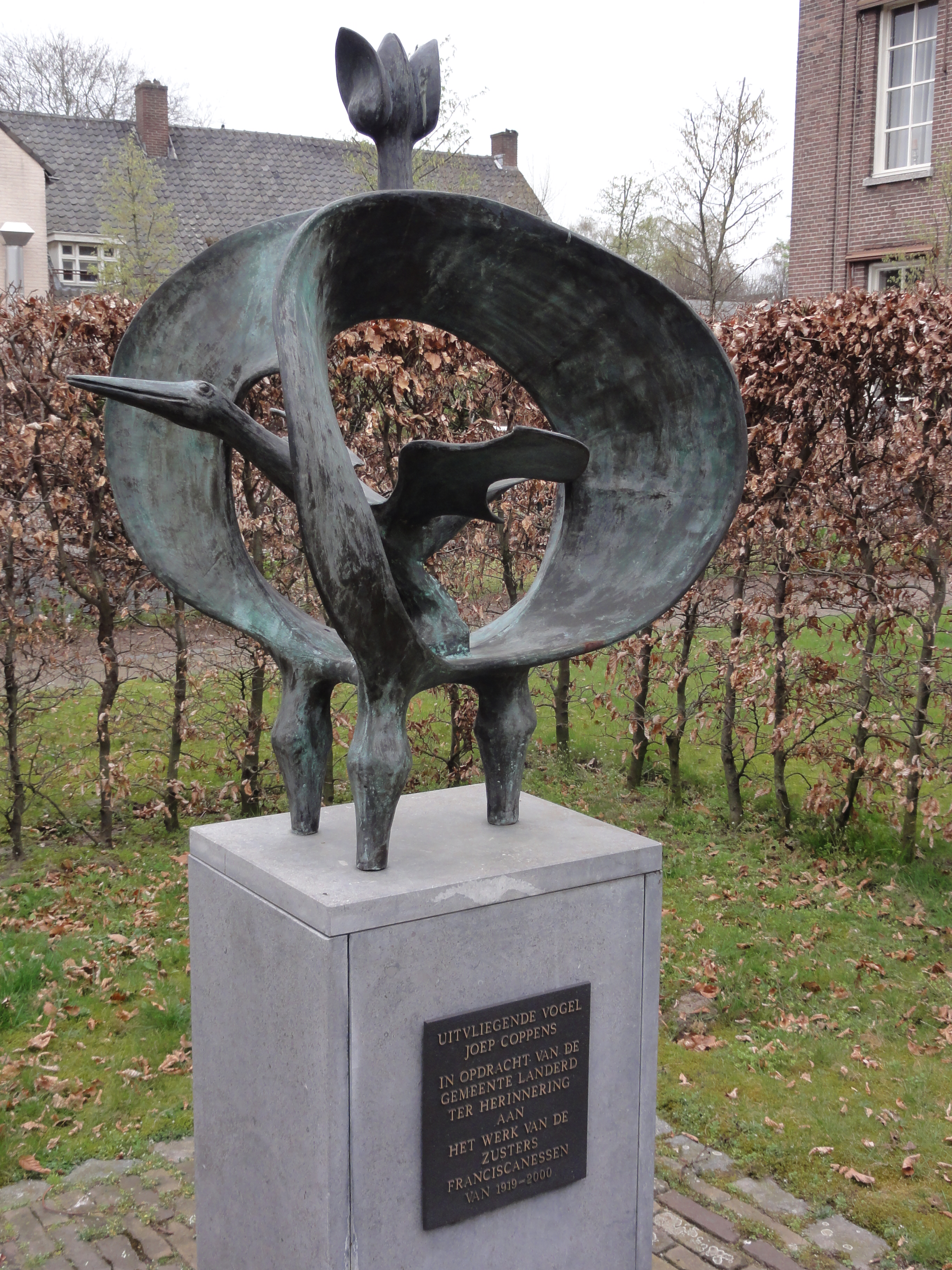
Reek (Landerd) Heijtmorgen

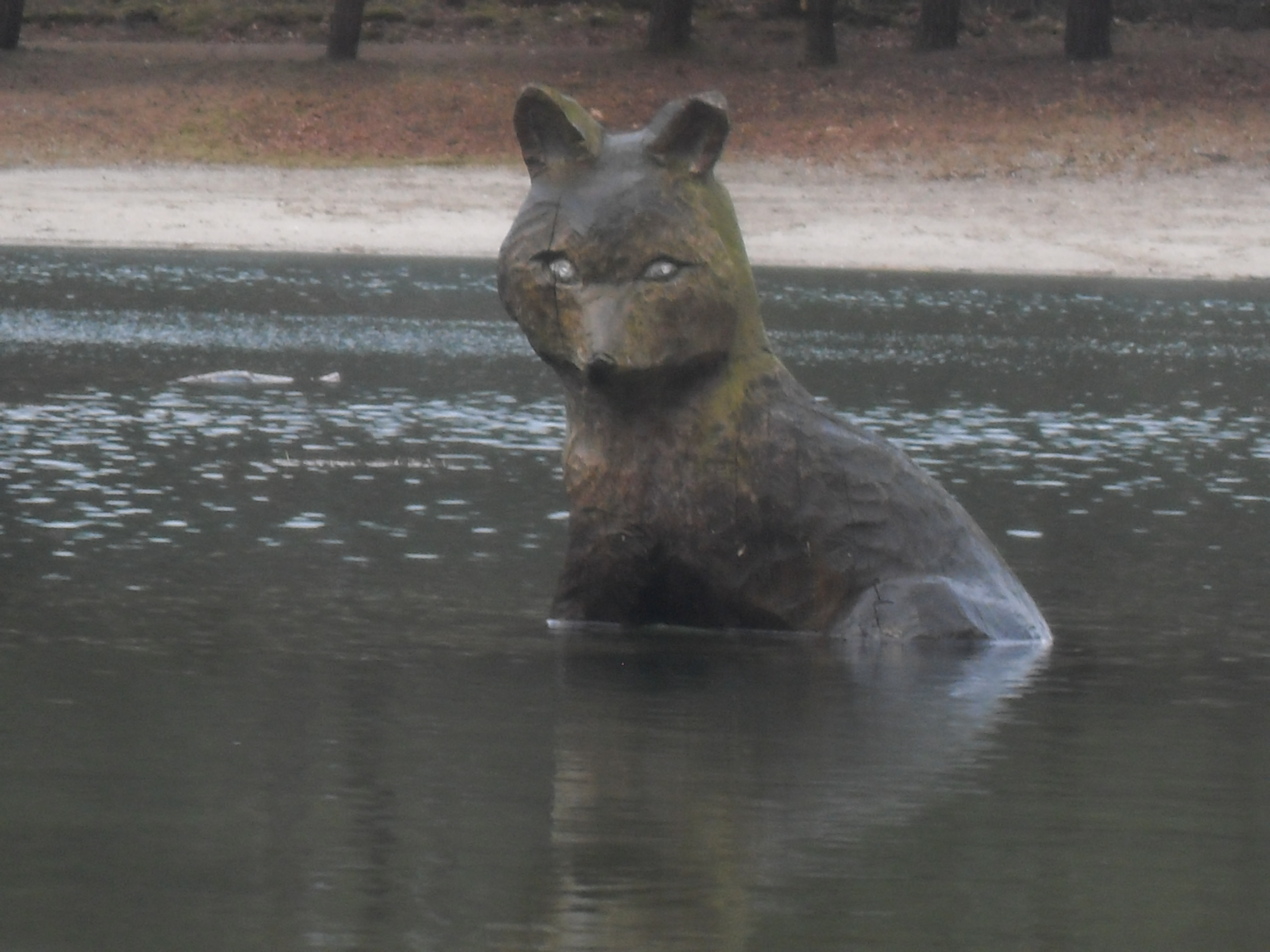
Vos - panoramio
