= ERC Broadband =

ERC Broadband is a project of the Education and Research Consortium, a non-profit organization created to expand the technical infrastructure of Western North Carolina and upstate South Carolina. ERC Broadband manages a regional network and offers Internet connectivity, data center services (including disaster recovery), and high performance computing services. Additionally, ERC Broadband is a top tier provider of NEXRAD Level II weather data from the National Weather Service.
