= Zeeland, North Brabant =

Zeeland
- Village
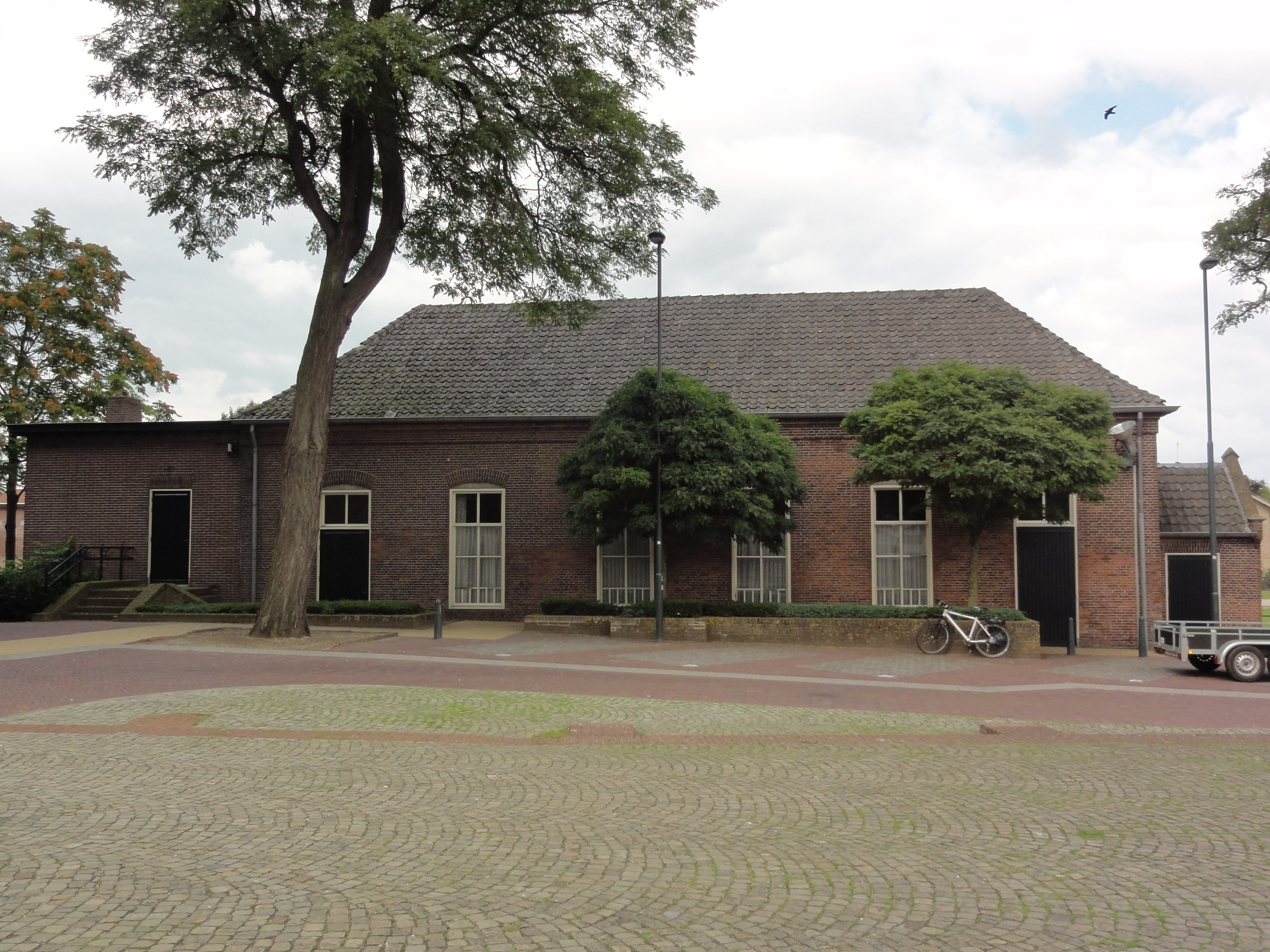
- Former school

- Flag Coat of arms

- Location in the province of North Brabant in the Netherlands Zeeland (Netherlands)
- Coordinates: 51°41′48″N 5°40′34″E
- Country: Netherlands
- Province: North Brabant
- Municipality: Maashorst

Area
  - Total: 3.07 km^{2} (1.19 sq mi)
- Elevation: 19 m (62 ft)

Population (2021)
  - Total: 4,885
  - Density: 1,590/km^{2} (4,120/sq mi)
- Time zone: UTC+1 (CET)
  - Summer (DST): UTC+2 (CEST)
- Postal code: 5410, 5411
- Dialing code: 0486
- Major roads: A50, N277, N324

Zeeland is a village in the Dutch province of North Brabant. It is located in the former municipality of Landerd, about 5 km northeast of Uden.

== History ==
The village was first mentioned in 1376 as Zeelant, and refers to Terra Salica, an inheritance system which excluded women. Zeeland developed in the Middle Ages on the edge of the Peel region. The Catholic St Jacobus de Meerdere Church was built between 1871 and 1872 as a replacement for its medieval predecessor.

Zeeland was home to 467 people in 1840. Zeeland was a separate municipality until 1994, when it became part of Landerd. Since 2022 it has been part of the new municipality of Maashorst.

== Gallery ==
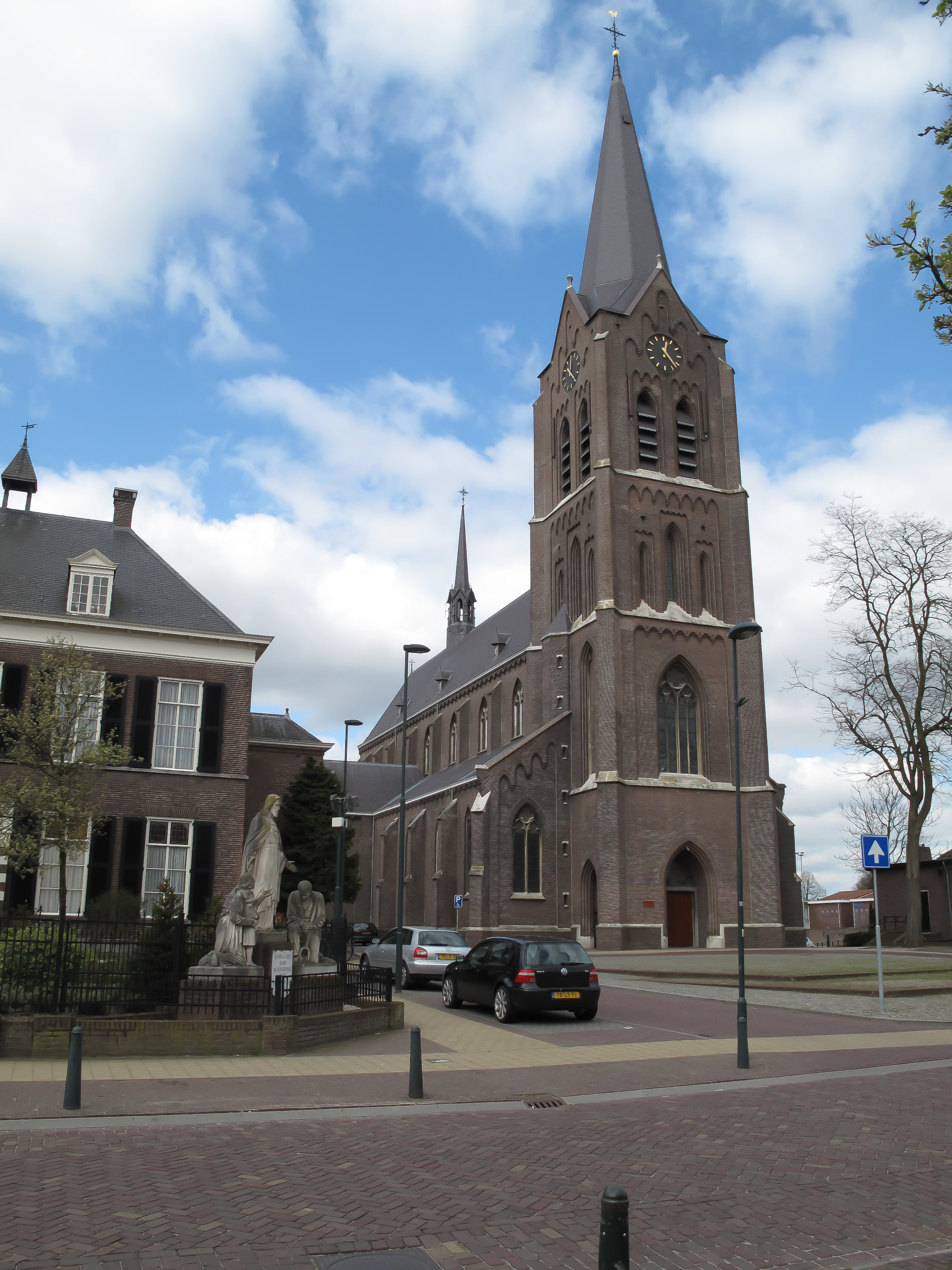
Zeeland, church

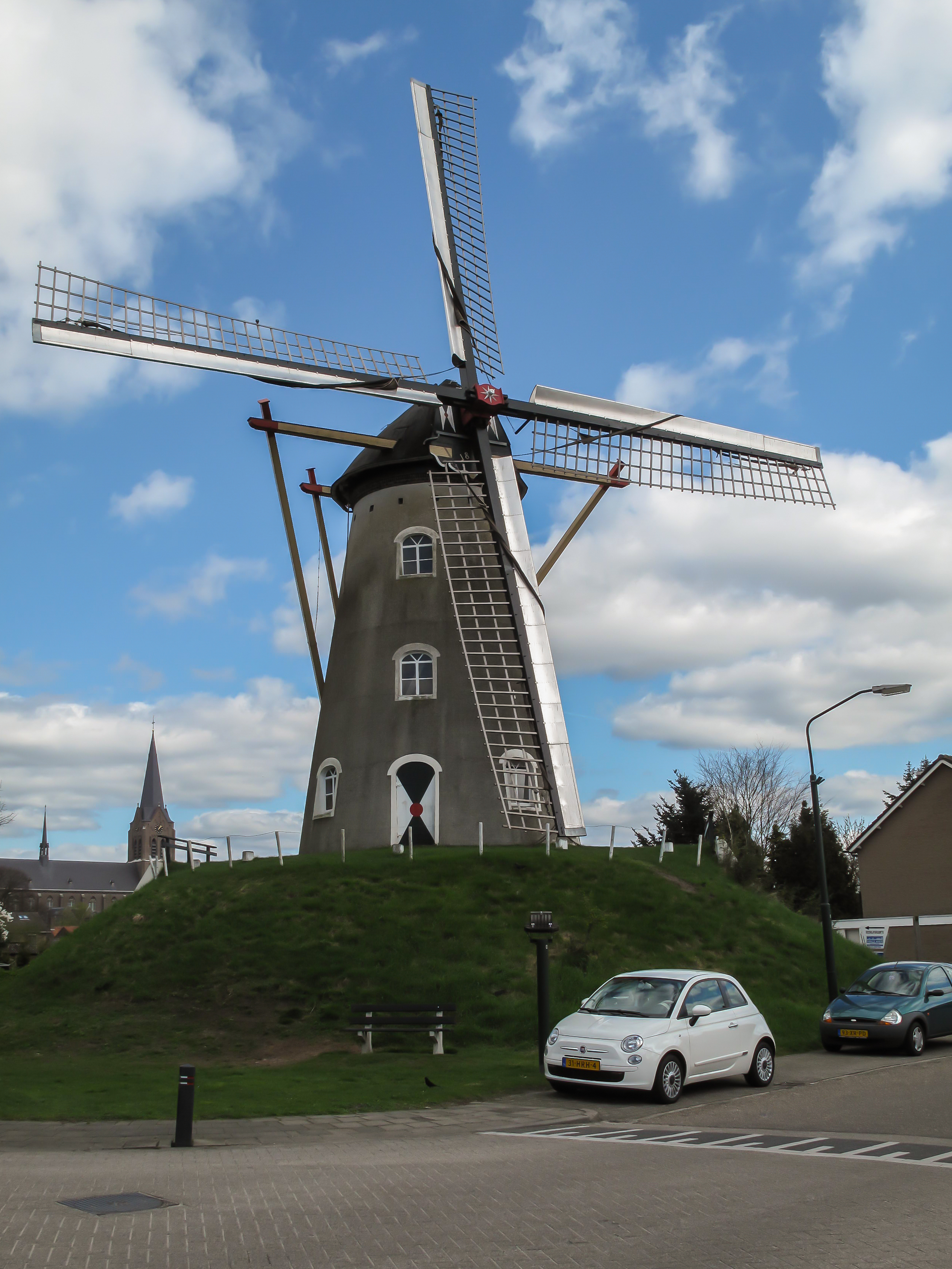
Zeeland, windmill

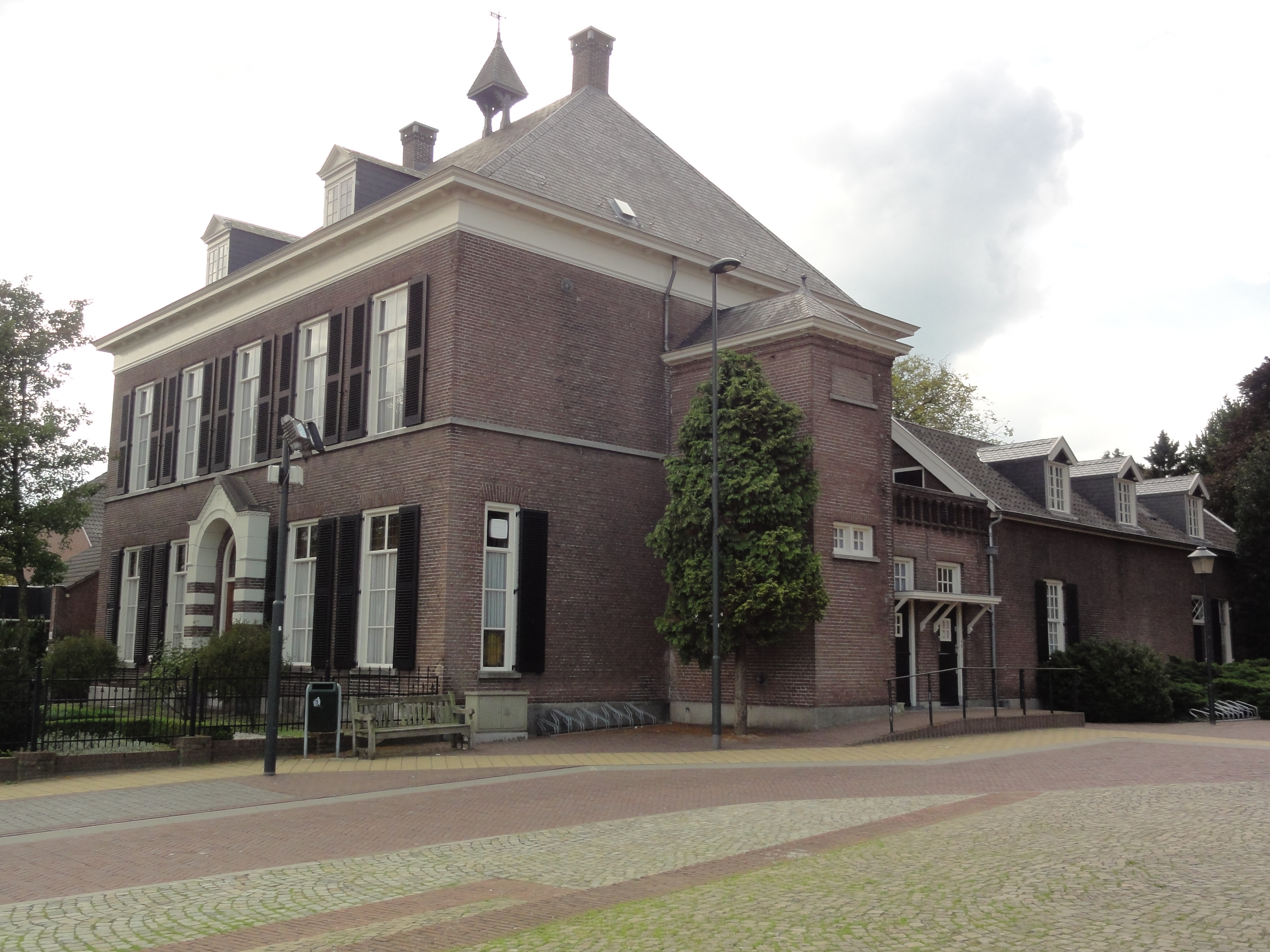
Clergy house

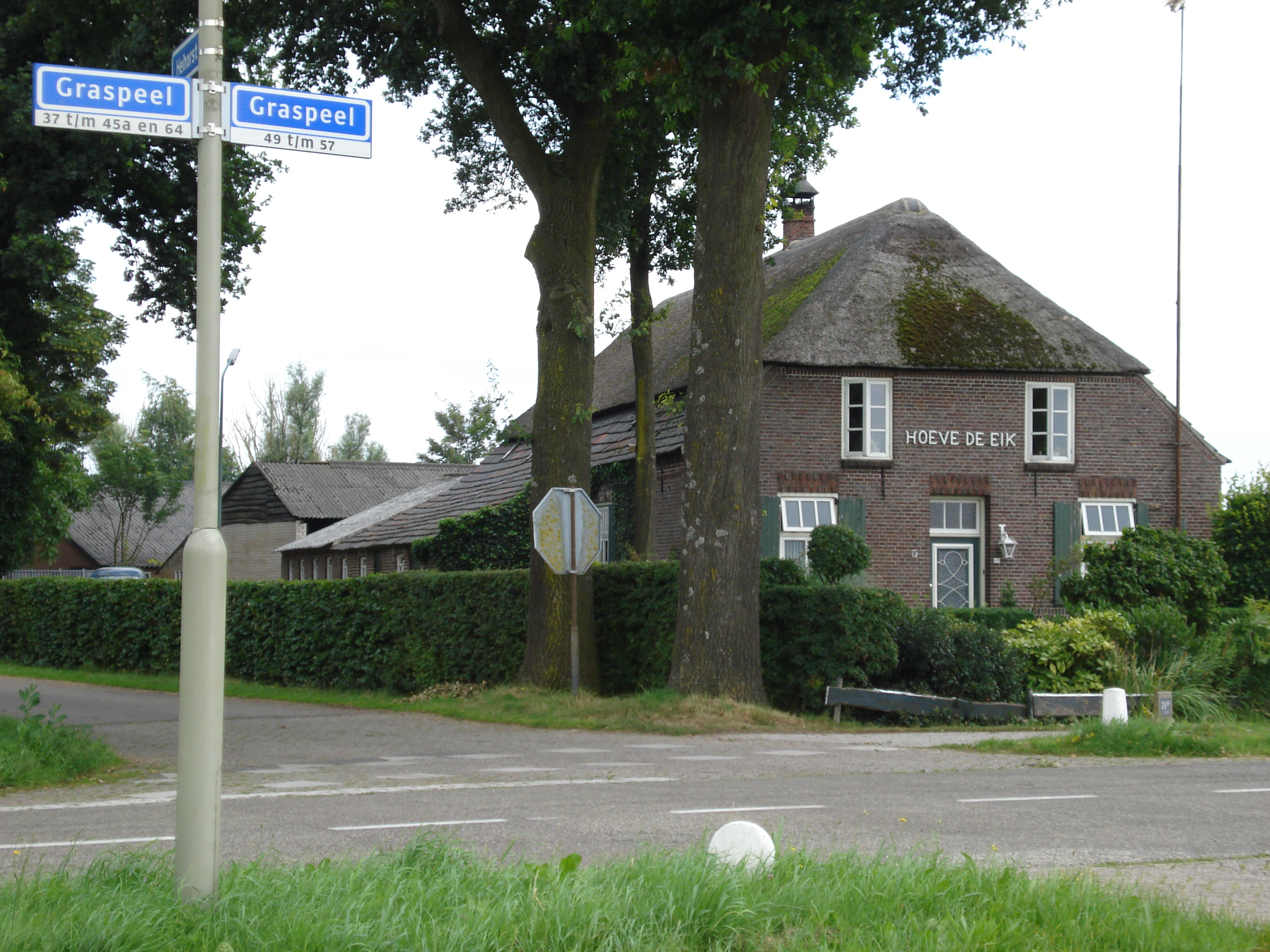
Farm in Zeeland
