= ERC (human resources organization) =

American human resource service organization

ERC is Northeast Ohio's largest organization providing Human Resources and workplace programs, practices, training and consulting. ERC also hosts the NorthCoast 99 program and sponsors the ERC Health insurance program. It is not uncommon for the media to quote ERC in their stories when looking for an authority on the subject. ERC's mission is to assist organizations in attracting, retaining, and motivating top performing employees.

ERC was founded in July 1920 as the American Plan Association of Cleveland. One of the organization’s main goals was to promote open shop employment instead of the common closed shop practice, which meant an employer was either union or non-union, but could not hire some of each. Another early goal was to help reduce the number of strikes locally, and the organization claimed it was at least partially responsible for reducing the number of strikes in Cleveland from 41 in 1920 to 21 in 1922. In 1920 Cleveland had been one of the few large cities in the US without a general employer’s association, yet by 1922 the APA of Cleveland had grown to be one of the largest such organizations in the country. In 1930 the organization was renamed The Associated Industries of Cleveland, and in 1986 the name Employer's Resource Council was coined. The organization is now more commonly referred to simply as ERC.

ERC is a current membership organization. Members of ERC receive access to salary, wage and benefits survey data, an HR Help Desk, online HR resources and tools, networking opportunities and cost savings through a network of preferred partners. ERC offers employee and job training locally and nationally including Supervisory Training, Management, Leadership, HR topics, Soft Skills, Computer/Software, and Technical training. ERC also offers compensation consulting, employee engagement consulting, and Fractional HR services.
