= Education and Research Consortium =

The Education and Research Consortium of the Western Carolinas (ERC) is a non-profit organization that works to promote better use of technology in education.

== History ==
The group was created in 1997 by U.S. representative Charles Taylor (NC 11) to put together a plan whereby Western North Carolina (WNC) could participate in and help develop the new technologies of the time. Out of this meeting a group was created with a board composed of the presidents and chancellors of Brevard College, Mars Hill College, Montreat College, Western Carolina University, and local businessmen. Also included in the ERC's activities are Furman University in South Carolina, University of North Carolina at Asheville and the area's community colleges. The ERC's goal is to work cooperatively to bring the benefits of new technology to WNC and upstate South Carolina, as an integrated region.

== Projects ==
Projects administered by the ERC include:

The Adventure of the American Mind Program (AAM Project) was designed to train in-service and pre-service classroom teachers and college teacher education faculty to access, use and produce curriculum utilizing the Internet and the digitized primary source materials from the collections of the U.S. Library of Congress. Initially, the AAM Project was offered through Brevard College, Mars Hill College and Montreat College in Western North Carolina. Since that time it has expanded to cover nine states.

ERC Broadband works to expand communities throughout Western Carolina through the build-out and expansion of broadband and data storage infrastructure. ERC Broadband actively supports local communities and government with their wide area networking, as well as expanding community understanding of how to apply technology. ERC's focus is in the areas of government, education, and healthcare. ERC Broadband - as a regional network - offers Internet connectivity, data center services, and is a top tier provider of NEXRAD Level II weather data from the U.S. National Weather Service.

Pisgah Forest Institute (PFI) provides environmental instruction for educators. PFI is a cooperative effort between Brevard College, the USDA Forest Service and the Cradle of Forestry in America Interpretive Association (CFAIA). PFI operates under the administration of the Appalachian Center for Environmental Solutions (ACES) at Brevard College as part of the ERC.

KCeeI is an environmental education Institute at Keystone College in LaPlume, Pennsylvania. It offered its first workshops in July 2004. The program is modeled after the Pisgah Forest Institute at Brevard College. KCeeI is committed provides hands-on, inquiry based science and environmental education to educators using nature as a laboratory.

The Digital Media Institute (DMI) began in the fall of 2002 with the primary objective of retraining displaced workers for the technology-driven job market. The program is administered through Blue Ridge Community College's Flat Rock campus and is funded through the United States Department of Labor.

HRSA: A telehealth grant through HRSA funded an initiative to electronically link area health care providers. This project was led by 14 area hospitals and aims to provide a system for integrated technology services.

ORNL/EERE: The ERC is currently working with UT–Battelle, the U.S. Department of Energy, and the Energy Efficiency and Renewable Energy Program at Oak Ridge National Laboratory to develop of new energy conservation and efficiency technologies in the Western Carolinas to support technology transfer in the region.
