= Maashorst =

- Municipality
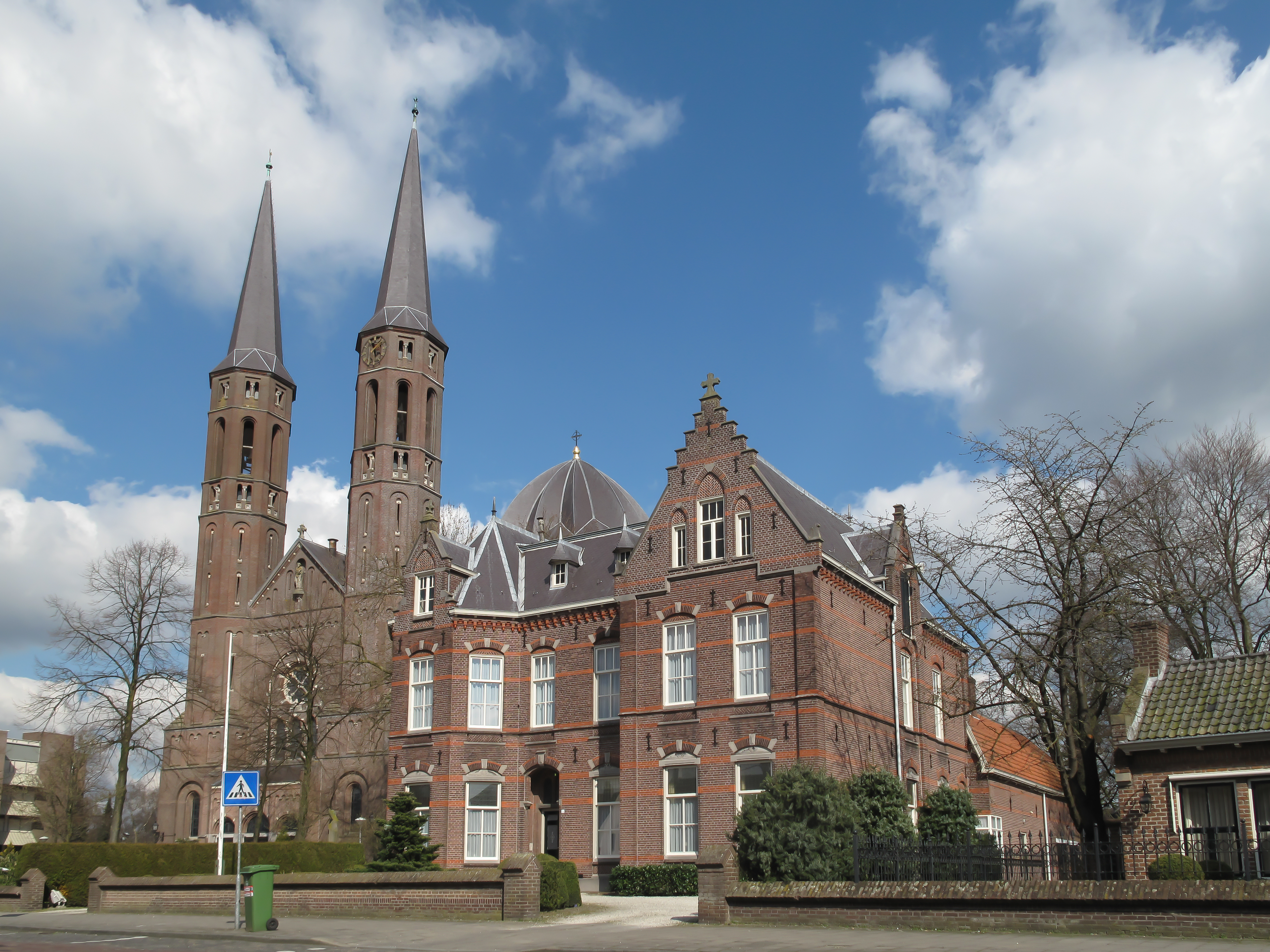
- St Peter Church in Uden

- Flag Coat of arms

- Location in North Brabant
- Country: Netherlands
- Province: North Brabant

Government
  - Body: Municipal council
  - Mayor: Paul Rüpp (acting) (CDA)

Area
  - Total: 138.24 km^{2} (53.37 sq mi)
  - Water: 0.89 km^{2} (0.34 sq mi)

Population (2022)
  - Total: 58,000
- Time zone: UTC+1 (CET)
  - Summer (DST): UTC+2 (CEST)
- Website: https://www.gemeentemaashorst.nl/

Maashorst is a municipality in the south of the Netherlands, formed from the merger of Landerd and Uden. The municipality came into existence on 1 January 2022. The name Maashorst refers to the nature reserve of the same name, which lies between the various village centres. The eastern part belongs to the region of De Peel.

== Geography ==
As of 2022, the areas encompassed by the municipality have a population of approximately 57 thousand people. The municipality is bordered by Bernheze to the west, Meierijstad to the southwest, Boekel to the south, Land van Cuijk to the east and Oss to the north. It consists of 6 main population centres.

== History ==
In 2015, the municipalities of Uden, Landerd and Bernheze indicated that they wanted to merge into a new municipality. At the end of 2015, a referendum was held in Landerd about the future of the municipality, in which a majority of the votes cast went to the option to merge with the municipality of Uden.

On 8 November 2018, the municipal councils of Landerd and Uden took a decision in principle to achieve a merger. The municipality of Bernheze withdrew in 2016.

On 16 April 2020, both municipal councils approved the advice for the merger. The provincial government of North Brabant approved the merger proposal on 13 May 2020.

After advice had been received from the Council of State, a merger bill was submitted to the House of Representatives on 4 November 2020. On 25 February 2021, the House of Representatives adopted the bill. The Senate passed the proposal on 13 July 2021 after a vote by sitting and standing.

The required municipal elections in Landerd and Uden were held on 24 November 2021. The new municipality of Maashorst will not participate in the regular municipal elections in 2022.

== Topography ==
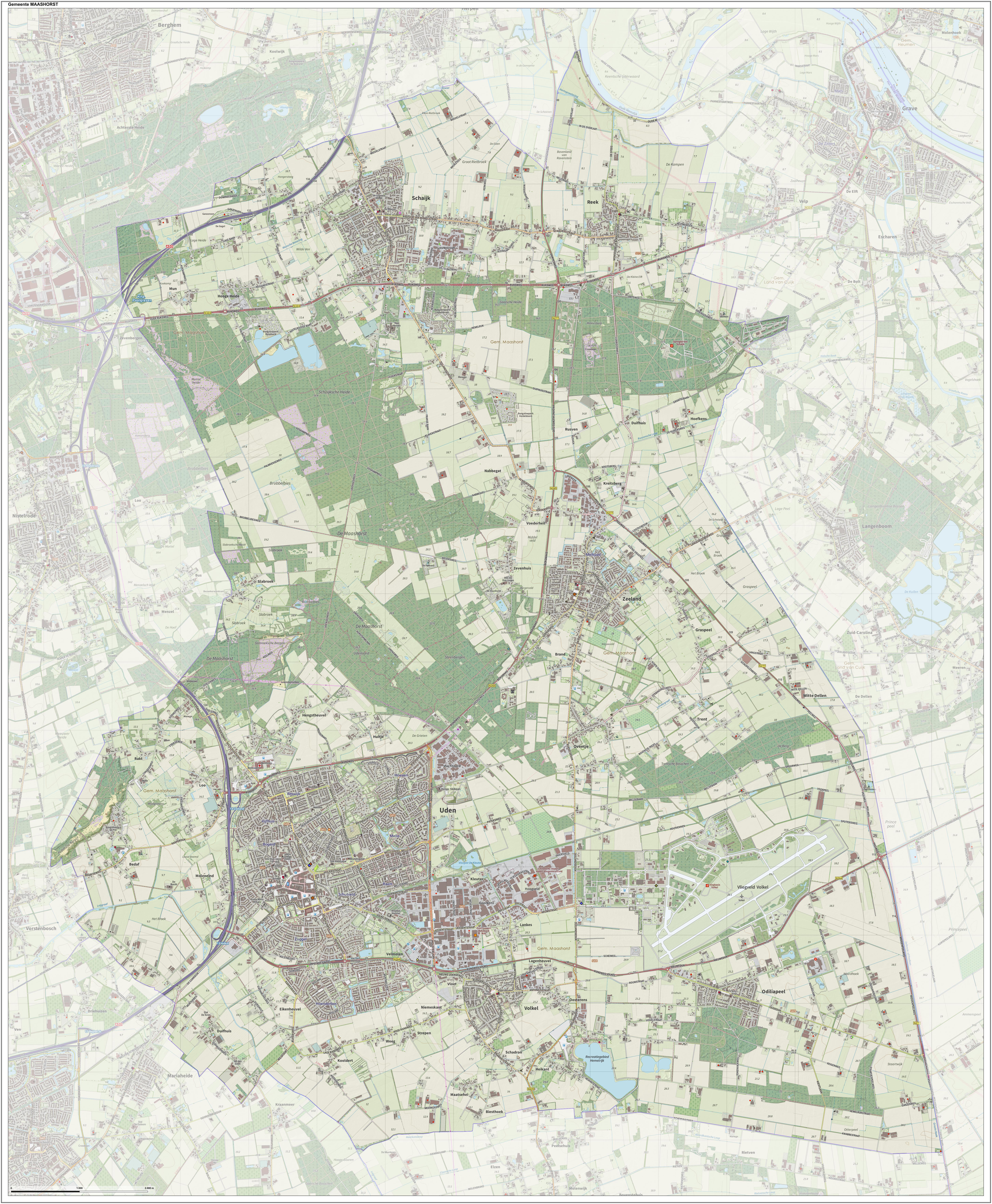
Topographic map of the municipality of Maashorst, 2022

== Politics ==
The first elections for the municipality were held on 24 November 2021.

== Gallery ==
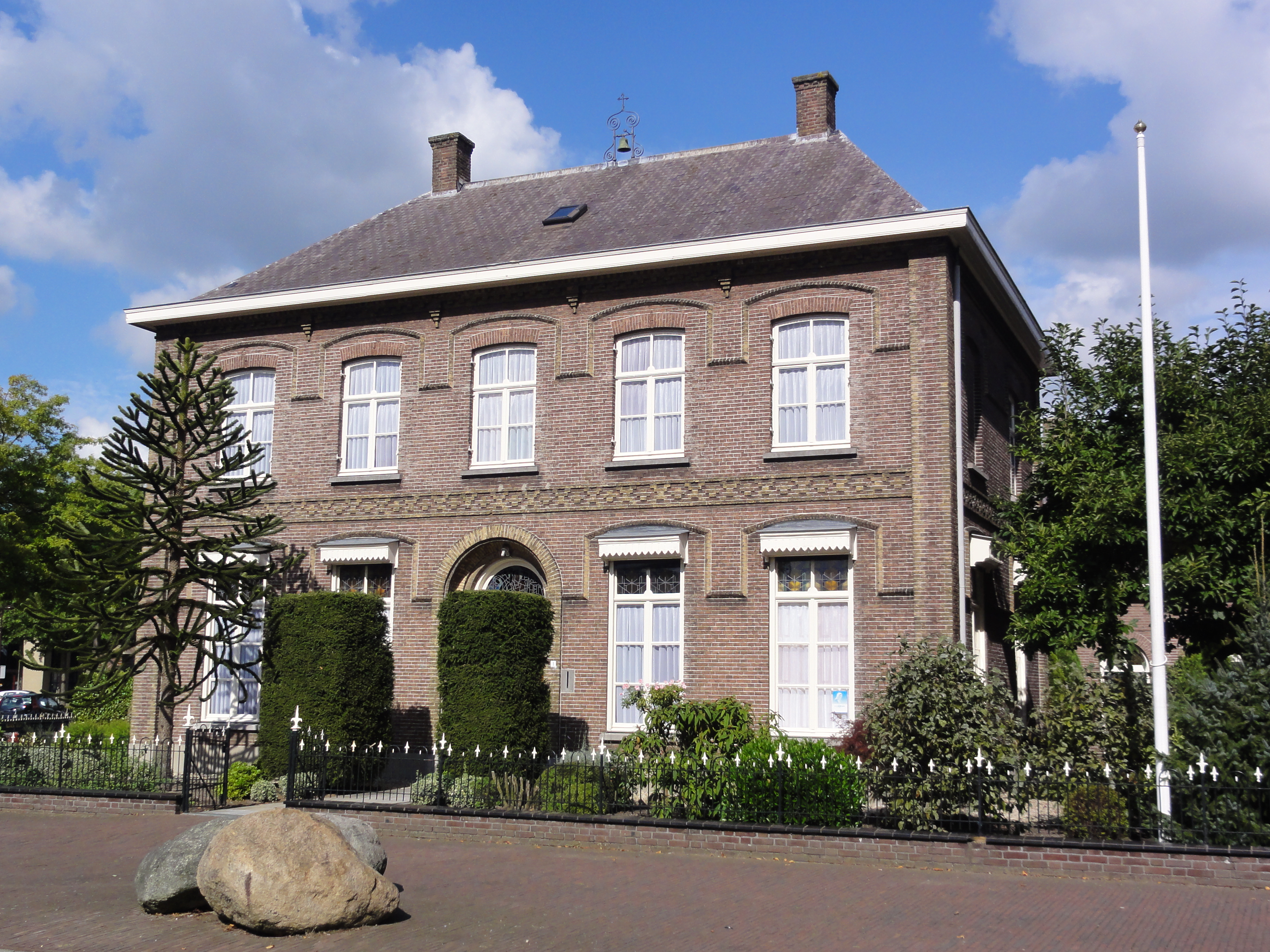
Clergy house in Schaijk

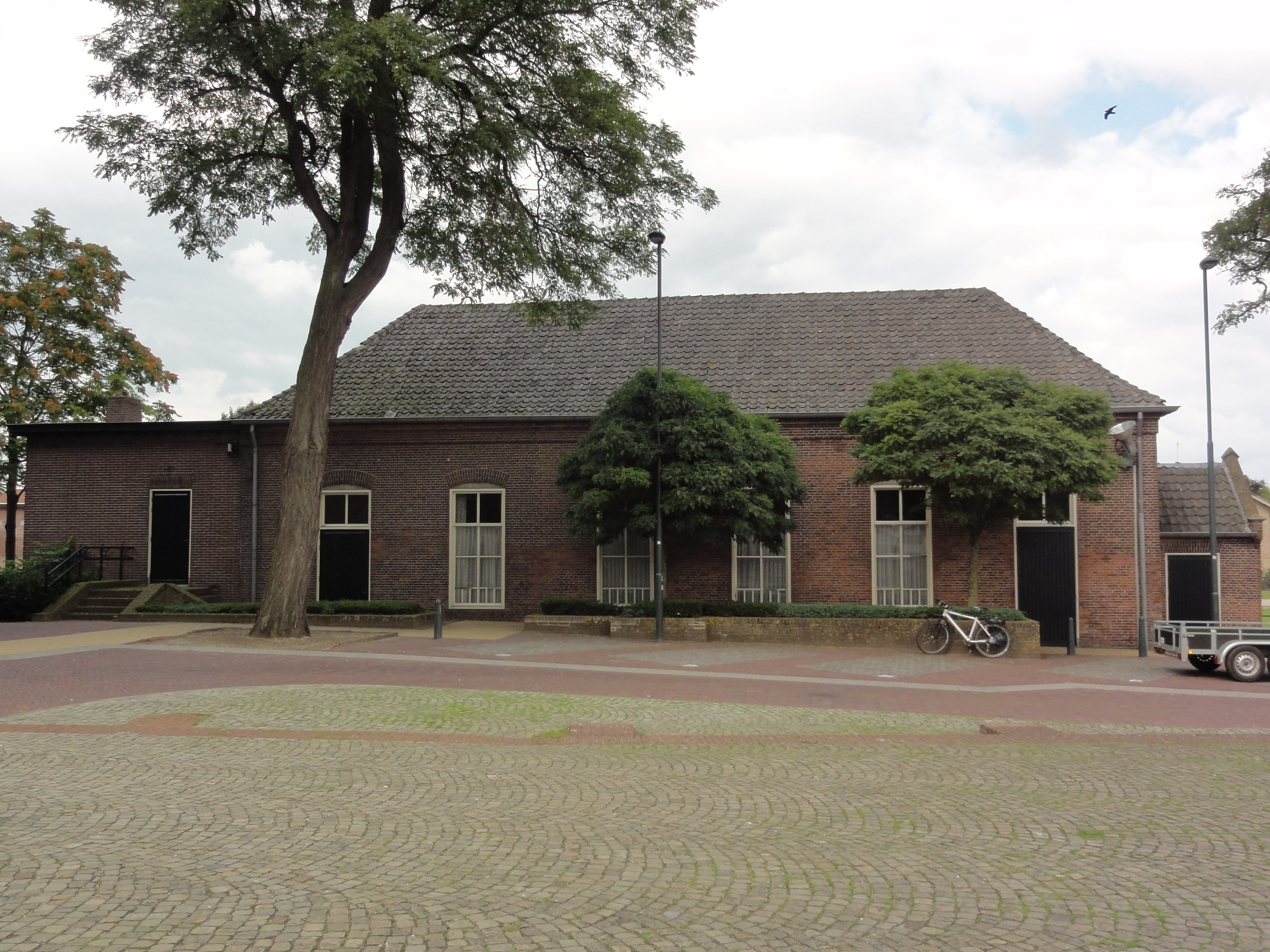
Church in Zeeland

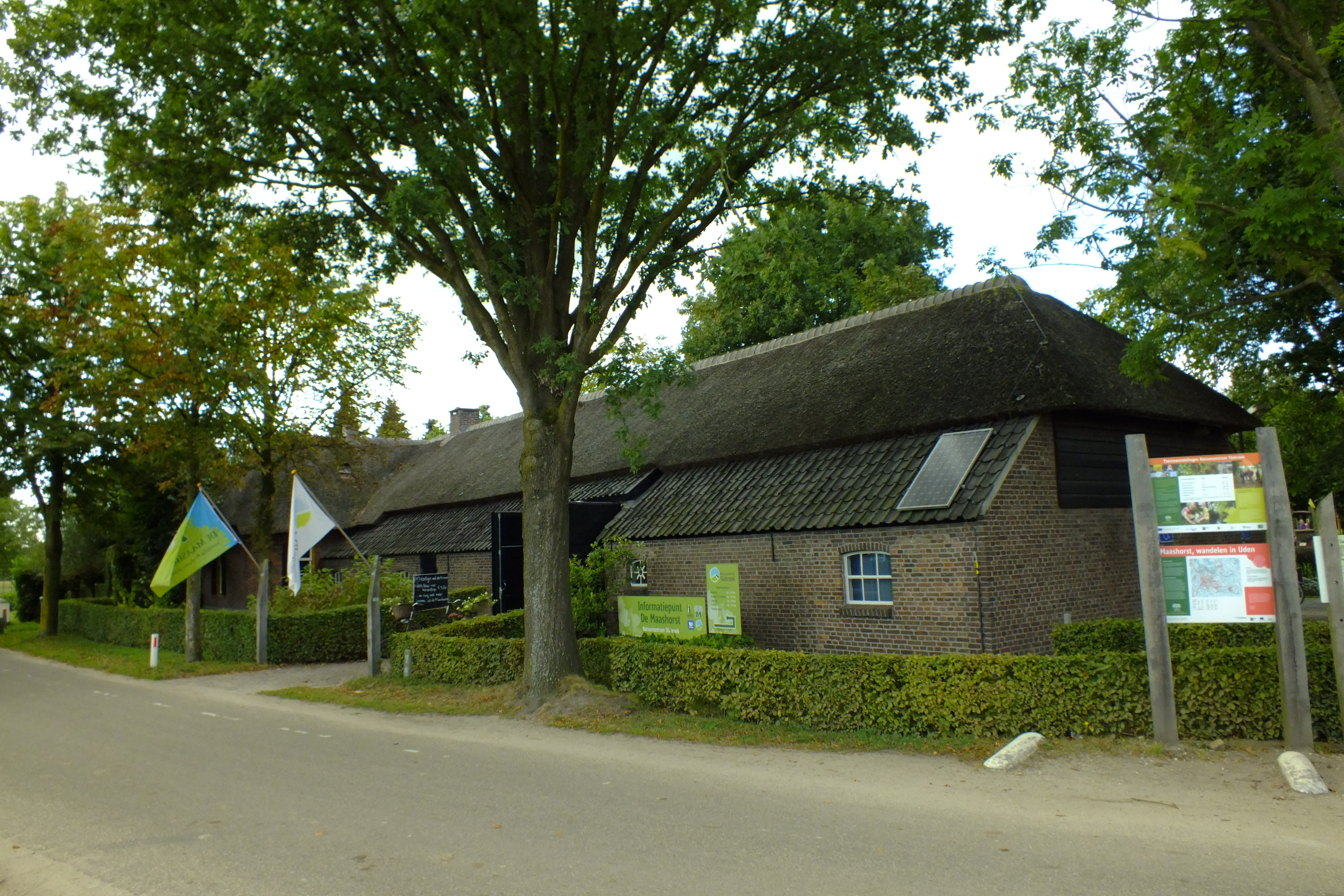
Visitor's centre Slabroek

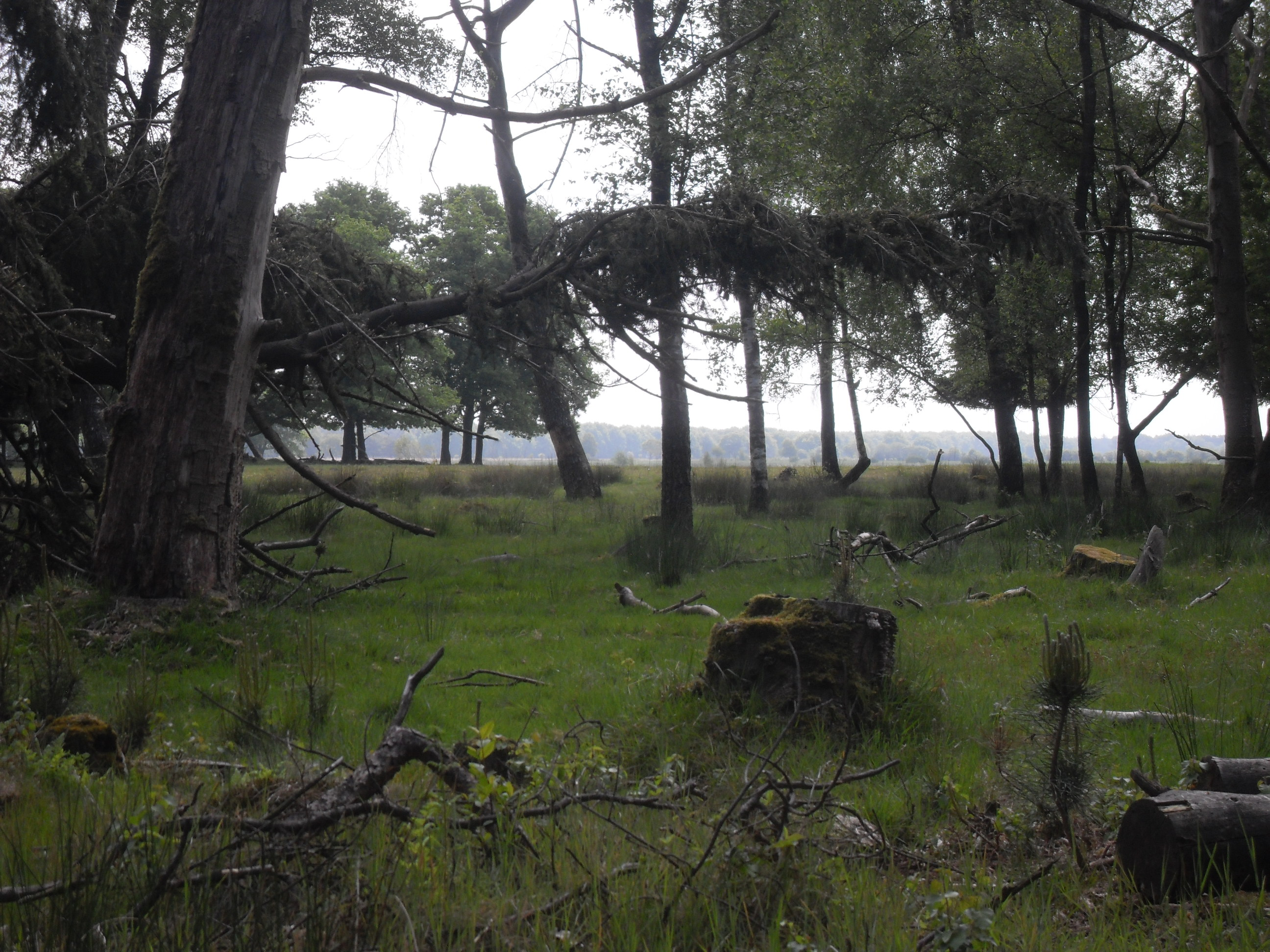
Nature near Maashorts
