= Margaretha =

Margaretha (Dutch pronunciation: [mɑrɣaːˈreːtaː]) is the standard Dutch form of the feminine given name Margaret as well as a common form of it in Sweden. In daily life, many use a short form, like Gré, Greet, Greta, Grietje, Marga, Margo, Margot, Margreet, Margriet, and Meta. People with the name include:

- Margaretha (soldier), 17th-century Dutch soldier
- Margaretha von Bahr (1921—2016), Finnish ballerina and choreographer
- Margaretha van Bancken (1628–1694), Dutch publisher
- Margaretha Cornelia Boellaard (1795–1872), Dutch painter, lithographer and art collector
- Margaretha "Margreeth" de Boer (born 1939), Dutch government minister
- Margaretha Byström (born 1937), Swedish actress, writer and director
- Margaretha Coppier (1516–1597), Dutch noble and a heroine of the Dutch war of liberation
- Margaretha Donner (1726–1774), Swedish businessperson
- Margaretha Dros-Canters (1900–1934), Dutch hockey, badminton- and tennis player
- Margaretha Brita "Greta" Duréel (died 1696), Swedish noble bank fraudster
- Margaretha Flesch (1826–1906), Beatified German Franciscan nun
- Margaretha E.C. "Caroline" de Fouw (born 1966), Dutch cricketer
- Margaretha Cornelia "Greetje" Gaillard (1926–2019), Dutch swimmer
- Margaretha van Godewijk (1627–1677), Dutch poet and flower still life painter
- Margaretha H.M. Groeneveld (born 1956), Dutch singer and television presenter known as Marcha or Marga bult
- Margaretha Guidone (born 1956), Dutch-Belgian environmentalist
- Margaretha Haverman (1693–aft.1739), Dutch flower still life painter
- Margaretha de Heer (1603–1665), Dutch genre and animal painter
- Margaretha Heijkenskjöld (1781–1834), Swedish traveler and a dress reformer
- Margaretha Hofmans (1894–1968), Dutch faith healer and confidante of Queen Juliana
- Margaretha van Holland (1311–1356), Countess of Holland and Hainaut
- Margaretha "Greta" Keller (1903–1977), Austrian-American cabaret singer and actress
- Margaretha Kirch (c.1703–aft.1744), German astronomer
- Margaretha A.M. "Marga" Klompé (1912–1986), Dutch government minister
- Margaretha Krook (1925–2001), Swedish stage and film actress
- Margaretha Leenmans (1909–1998), Dutch poet and psychiatrist better known as M. Vasalis
- Margaretha Lind (born 1942), Jordanian princess
- Margaretha Lindahl (born 1974), Swedish curler
- Margaretha Loewensberg (born 1943), Swiss architect
- Margaretha Antonia Marie Félicité of Luxembourg (born 1957), Princess of Luxembourg and Liechtenstein
- Margaretha van Mechelen (c.1580–1662), Mistress of Maurice of Nassau, Prince of Orange
- Margaretha M.A. "Margriet" de Moor (born 1941), Dutch pianist and writer of novels and essays
- Margaretha van Norden (1911–1963), Dutch swimmer
- Margaretha van Parma (1522–1586), Flemish Governor of the Habsburg Netherlands from 1559 to 1567
- Margaretha "Marga" van Praag (born 1946), Dutch journalist and television presenter
- Margaretha Reichardt (1907–1984), German textile artist, weaver, and graphic designer
- Margaretha Roosenboom (1843–1896), Dutch flower still life painter
- Margaretha Alexandrine von Rothschild (1855–1905), daughter of Baron Mayer Carl von Rothschild
- Barbara Margaretha "Meta" von Salis (1855–1929), Swiss feminist and historian
- Margaretha Sandra (1629–1674), Dutch Franco-Dutch War heroine
- Margaretha Seuerling (1747–1820), Swedish actress and theatre director
- Margaretha Sigfridsson (born 1976), Swedish curler
- Margaretha C.A. "Margreeth" Smilde (born 1954), Dutch CDA politician
- Margaretha E. "Margriet" Tindemans (1951–2014), Dutch musician, specializing in medieval music
- Margaretha Maria "Gretha" Tromp (born 1964), Dutch sprinter and hurdler
- Margaretha af Ugglas (born 1939), Swedish government minister
- Margaretha van Valckenburch (1565–1650), Dutch shipowner, only female stockholder of the Dutch East India Company
- Margaretha von Waldeck (1533–1554), German noble, possible inspiration for Snow White
- Margaretha Wulfraet (1678–1760), Dutch painter
- Margaretha Geertruida "Grietje" Zelle (1876–1917), Dutch exotic dancer and courtesan executed by France (Mata Hari)
- Margaretha Zetterberg (1733–1893), Finnish textile and handcrafts worker

== See also ==
- Johan & Margaretha, sometimes also just "Margaretha", a resort in Suriname
- Margareta, another spelling used in Sweden and elsewhere
- Margarethe, a German version of the name
