= Griet =

Griet may mean:

- An Afrikaans term used for shock.
- Another name for a Godwit.
- Griet, a fictional horse in the South African children's TV series Liewe Heksie
- A Dutch feminine given name, short for Margarita (see Grietje)
- Gokaraju Rangaraju Institute of Engineering and Technology, in India.
