= Margriet =

Margriet is a Dutch feminine given name, a form of Margaretha (Margaret). People with the name include:

- Princess Margriet of the Netherlands (born 1943), Dutch princess
- Margriet Bleijerveld (born 1958), Dutch hockey player
- Margriet Ehlen (born 1943), Dutch poet
- Margriet Hermans (born 1954), Belgian politician
- Margriet Heymans (1932–2023), Dutch writer and illustrator of children's literature
- Margriet Hoenderdos (1952–2010), Dutch composer
- Margriet Kloppenburg (born 1988), Danish racing cyclist
- Margriet Matthijsse (born 1977), Dutch sailor
- Margriet de Moor (born 1941), Dutch writer
- Margriet van Noort (1587–1646), Dutch Discalced Carmelite writer
- Margriet Smulders (born 1955), Dutch photographer
- Margriet Tindemans (1951–2014), Dutch violinist
- Margriet Zegers (born 1954), Dutch hockey player
