= Arjan Elbers =

Dutch recruitment strategist and author

Arjan Elbers is a Dutch recruitment strategist and entrepreneur. He co-founded the recruitment-marketing agency Getnoticed in 2009 and served as its managing director until 2022. In 2022 he became chairman of Recruiters United and founded Stichting Guruz, a non-profit organisation that produces online guest lectures for secondary vocational education.

== Career ==
Elbers co-founded Getnoticed in 2009 in Nederweert with Randy Cillekens and Dirk Driessen. He served as the company's managing director until 2022, when he stepped down after about thirteen years and remained associated with the company as a recruitment strategist.

In January 2022 Elbers became chairman of Recruiters United, succeeding Gusta Timmermans. In interviews he has argued that recruiters should consider an organisation's broader labour needs rather than focus solely on filling individual vacancies.

== Recruitment and vocational education ==
In 2022 Elbers founded Stichting Guruz, a non-profit organisation that produces online guest lectures for secondary vocational education (mbo). The initiative aims to connect vocational education with the labour market.

== 2019 Trump border-wall incident ==
In April 2019, The Next Crowd, a company of which Elbers was managing director, announced that it had been selected to recruit construction workers for the proposed United States–Mexico border wall. The company later acknowledged that the announcement was an April Fools' hoax intended to promote a new website
