= Kevin Volans =

Irish composer of South-African birth

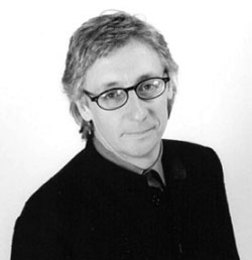

Kevin Volans (born 26 July 1949) is a South African-born Irish composer and pianist. He studied with Karlheinz Stockhausen and Mauricio Kagel in Cologne in the 1970s and later became associated with the Neue Einfachheit (New Simplicity) movement in the city. In the late 1970s he became interested in the indigenous music of his homeland and began a series of pieces which attempted to combine aspects of African and contemporary European music. Although Volans later moved away from any direct engagement with African music, certain residual elements such as interlocking rhythms, repetition and open forms are still detectable in his music since the early 1990s which have taken a new direction more redolent of certain schools of abstract art. He settled in Ireland permanently in 1986 and was granted Irish citizenship in 1994.

== Biography ==
Volans was born in Pietermaritzburg, South Africa, on 26 July 1949. During his teenage years, he developed an interest in the music of the post-war avant-garde as well as abstract painting. He pursued a Bachelor of Music degree at the University of the Witwatersrand graduating in 1972, where June Schneider was one of his teachers. After postgraduate study at the University of Aberdeen he moved in 1973 to Cologne, where he became one of only five students admitted to Stockhausen's composition class at the Musikhochschule. He became intimately acquainted with Stockhausen's extensions of serial technique and eventually became his teaching assistant in 1975–76, replacing Richard Toop. He also took lessons in music theatre from Mauricio Kagel as well as taking piano lessons from Aloys Kontarsky and studying electronic music with Hans-Ulrich Humpert.

While in Cologne Volans became increasingly dissatisfied with the new-music movement in the city, which he perceived to be dogmatic and creatively restricting. Alongside other composers such as Walter Zimmermann, Gerald Barry, and Michael von Biel, Volans began to question the hegemony of the prevailing new-music style that was based on an extension of the serial techniques of the previous generation. This group of composers, loosely referred to as the Cologne School, marked the start of the Neue Einfachheit (New Simplicity) movement which began with a concert series organised by Zimmermann in January 1977. Composers linked with the New Simplicity generally sought a more transparent and direct style, an openness to aspects of tonality and freedom to use pre-existing material quite in contrast to the intense abstraction of the post-war avant-garde.

== Africa series ==
Despite having grown up in South Africa, Volans had little contact with the indigenous music of his homeland due to apartheid strictures which largely prohibited the intermingling of black and white cultures. It was not until he was commissioned by Westdeutscher Rundfunk (WDR) to undertake a number of field trips between 1976 and 1979 to South Africa to record various kinds of indigenous African music that he began to actively take an interest in this music. These field trips alerted him to aspects of indigenous African culture, both musical and visual, which he had previously overlooked. He thus set about planning a series of works in which he attempted to reconcile African and European aesthetics. At the start of the series Volans envisaged that the African source material would be quite recognizable but as the series progressed he would gradually exercise more and more intervention into it so that by the end of the series the African material would be fully assimilated into his own style:

I planned a series of pieces which were graded (as a learning curve) from pure transcription (in the manner of Bach) through paraphrase (as in Liszt), quotation as object trouvé (Charles Ives) assimilation (in the tradition of Stravinsky and Bartók) to what was then called an "invented folklore"—what I thought of as a new music of southern Africa, or music for a new South Africa. Thus the series began with Mbira (1981) (now withdrawn) which involved traditional patterns, some newly composed patterns and a nontraditional coda, Matepe (1982), which is largely non-traditional in style, and where the music is expanded to encompass the wider range of the harpsichord, through to She Who Sleeps with a Small Blanket (1985) in which only the title is African.

As a political statement, Volans, as a white South African, felt that the series might lend some sort of contribution to the struggle against apartheid and some performances were met with protests from the musical establishment in South Africa. The most well-known piece from the series is White Man Sleeps (1982) for two harpsichords, viola da gamba and percussion. In this piece Volans attempted to "Africanize" Western European art music by transferring paraphrases and transcriptions of Venda, San, Nyungwe and Lesotho music, as well as his own material, onto re-tuned period instruments. The subsequent reworking of the piece for a recording by the Kronos Quartet became one of the biggest-selling string-quartet releases of all time. The works immediately following White Man Sleeps, such as the second and third quartets, continue to use some African references, but display an increasing preoccupation with non-directional narratives influenced by the uneven and often random patterns present in African textiles, as well as the open approach to time present in the late works of Morton Feldman.

== Towards abstraction ==
Despite the success of the African series, Volans began to find himself increasingly categorized as an "African" composer – a label which he found creatively restricting. In the late 1980s he began to pursue a new direction, developing a style characterized by an overall tendency towards increasing abstraction occasionally punctuated by works where literal African elements once again re-emerge. This is clearly seen in works such as Chevron (1990) and One Hundred Frames (1991), as well as his opera The Man with Footsoles of Wind (1993) based on the last year of the life of the 19th-century poet Arthur Rimbaud. A parallel development to this was his increasing interest in writing for dance, an art form particularly suited to Volans's open conception of formal structure and he has collaborated with the choreographers Jonathan Burrows, Siobhan Davies and Shobana Jeyasingh.

The key work which confirmed this new direction is Cicada (1994) for two pianos, which was inspired by his experience inside one of James Turrell's Skyspaces. The piece involves very gradual adjustments of tone, harmonic colour and tempo being applied to a repeated sonority based on a B-flat major and A major triads. Described by the composer as his first minimalist piece, Cicada's reduction in content and largely flat surface is a departure from the generally high degree of activity which marked many of his earlier works. Although there is no recognizably African material present in the piece, the existence of interlocking patterns, inherent rhythms and open non-developmental forms demonstrate how African elements continue to inform his work in a background capacity.

In a number of works since Cicada, Volans limited the content and pursued a similar policy of incremental changes at the margins of the material. The reduction of material in these pieces is even more extreme than in Cicada and exemplifies a tendency which Volans has described as follows:

Looking back over the music of the 20th century, I have been struck by how on the whole mainstream music has been very "busy"... Emptiness has not been a favourite mode of expression. By contrast, visual artists have repeatedly simplified their imagery and had regular "clean-outs". Malevich, Mondrian, Yves Klein, Rothko, Agnes Martin, Brice Marden and others immediately spring to mind... At the turn of the century I became increasingly interested in eliminating subject matter in my music as far as possible. My ideal would be the equivalent of the blank canvas. I am still a long way off achieving this: old habits die hard.

Two works in particular demonstrate this tendency – String Quartet No. 6 and the Concerto for Double Orchestra. String Quartet No. 6 is not in fact a string quartet at all but a piece for two spatially separated string quartets which can be performed live with both quartets or with one live and the other pre-recorded. The vast majority of the piece consists of just two chords which overlap between both quartets creating a blurring of the harmonies not unlike the blurring of colour fields in the paintings of Mark Rothko, which served as the piece's inspiration. In the Concerto for Double Orchestra (2001) static harmonies are spatially distributed back and forth between a split orchestra with a focus on the "edges" of the chords through accented pizzicatos and dynamics rather than "bleeding" them together. Both of these works demonstrate Volans's concerns with moving the site of musical discourse to the margins of the material, a strategy inspired by his lifelong interest in visual art. The music tends to focus on the interplay between dynamics, voicings, register, timbre and types of attack; parameters which are usually considered secondary to larger-scale transformations in the domain of pitch and rhythm. The reduced approach to content directs attention towards changes in the slightest details and encourages a form of engagement perhaps more prevalent in the world of visual art.

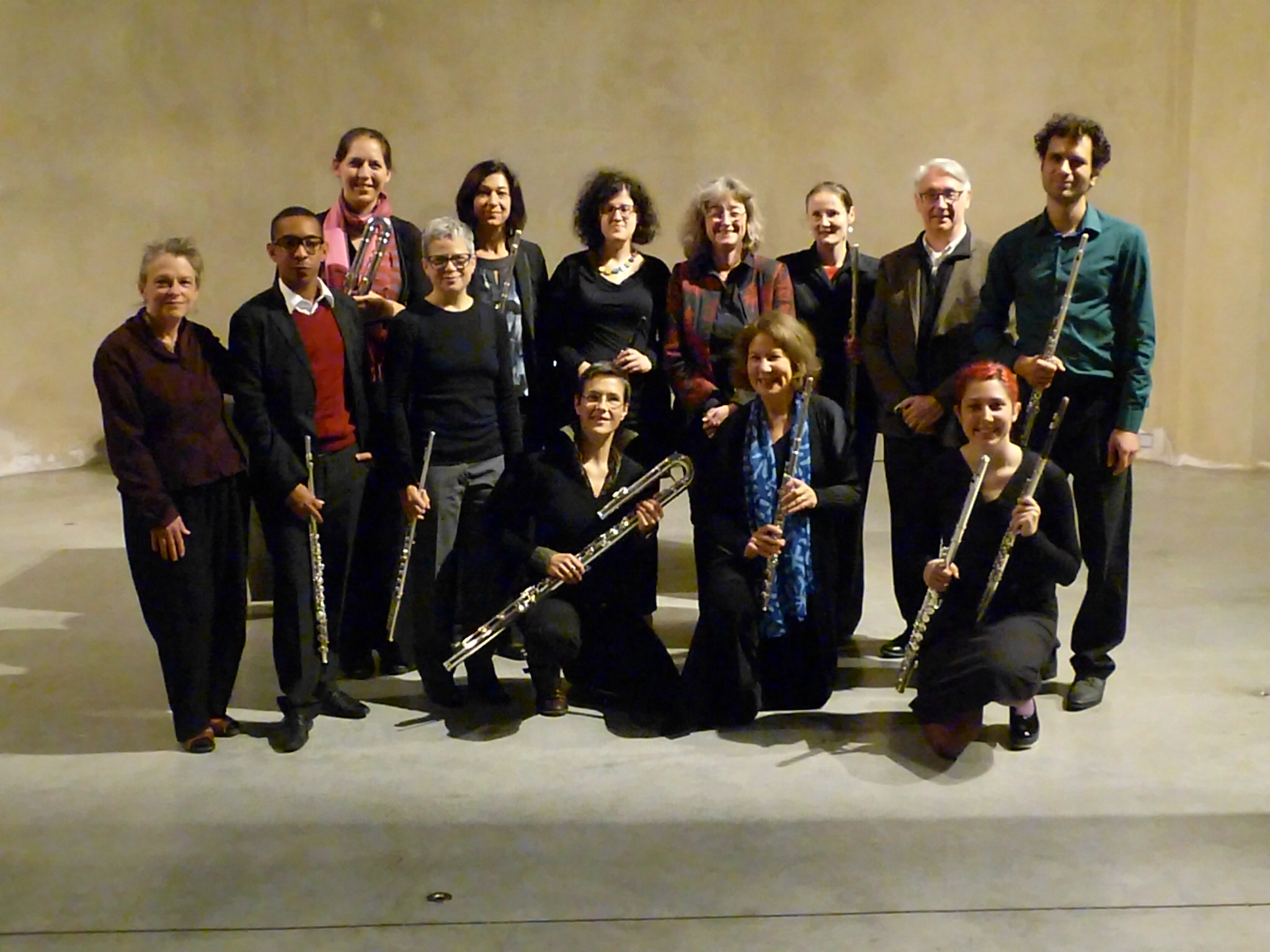
Volans (standing, 2nd from right, with composer Mary Jane Leach (front row standing, 3rd from left), 2015 in Cologne

This tendency towards reduction is not universal, however. Perhaps due to the inherent nature of the medium, Volans's concertante works such as the Trio Concerto (2005) and the Piano Concerto No. 2 (2006) are notable for their virtuosic writing and dynamism. Volans's most recent work constitutes yet another phase of development. Beginning with The Partenheimer Project (2007), much of the new work explores the interaction between individual parts playing independently of each other to some degree. The Partenheimer Project is spatially separated into three ensembles while both Violin: Piano (2008) and Cello: Piano (2008) contain instruments playing at different tempi propelled for the most part by irregular repetition. The transparent scoring and negation of any sense of goal-orientated progression lends the music a static floating quality.

While Volans's music has often been viewed as a reaction to the perceived excesses of serialism, it is nevertheless significant that his approach to dynamics and articulation is always structurally rather than expressively directed. In this way, Volans identifies with the tradition of modernism and his music studiously avoids any lapses into postmodern nostalgia. He has been described by the music critic Kyle Gann as:

By refusing to repeat himself or anyone else, Volans remains one of the planet's most distinctive and unpredictable voices.

In 1997 the BBC Music Magazine listed Volans as one of the 50 most important living composers. In 1999 the Southbank Centre in London hosted a 50th birthday celebration of his work, for his 60th the Wigmore Hall in London organised a "Kevin Volans Day" of concerts, and in 2019 the Wigmore Hall again had a concert celebrating his 70th birthday.

== Students ==
Volans taught composition at the University of Natal, where he received a DMus in 1986. He was also composer in residence at Queen's University Belfast (1986–89) and at Princeton University (1992).(Anon. & n.d. (c)) Since moving to Ireland in 1985 he has exerted a considerable influence on the direction of music in the country through his teaching. His notable students include Jennifer Walshe.

== Discography ==
- She Who Sleeps with a Small Blanket (Robin Schulkowsky, CD, Sony, 1985)
- String Quartet No. 1: 'White Man Sleeps' (Kronos Quartet, CD, Elektra Nonesuch, 1987)
- String Quartet No. 1: 'White Man Sleeps', (Dance no. 1) (Kronos Quartet, CD, Elektra Nonesuch, 1987)
- String Quartet No. 1: 'White Man Sleeps', Mbira, She Who Sleeps with a Small Blanket, White Man Sleeps (Original version) (The Smith Quartet, Kevin Volans, Robert Hill, Margriet Tindemans, Robin Schuikowsky, CD, Landor, 1990)
- 'Norwegian Wood: Happiness is a Warm Gun' (Lennon, arr. Volans) (Aki Takahashi, CD, EMI, 1991)
- String Quartet No. 2: 'Hunting Gathering' (Kronos Quartet, CD, Elektra Nonesuch, 1991)
- String Quartet No. 1: 'White Man Sleeps' (Kronos Quartet, CD, Elektra Nonesuch, 1992)
- String Quartet No. 3: 'The Songlines' (3rd movement) (Balanescu Quartet, CD, Argos, 1994)
- String Quartet No. 2: 'Hunting Gathering', String Quartet No. 3: 'The Songlines' (Balanescu Quartet, CD, Decca/Argo, 1994)
- String Quartet No. 5: 'Dancers on a Plane', String Quartet No. 4: 'The Ramanujan Notebooks', Movement for String Quartet (The Duke Quartet, CD, Collins Classics, 1994)
- Mbira (Kevin Volans Ensemble, CD, WDR World Network Recording, 1995)
- White man Sleeps (Guitar version of Dance No. 4) (Tilman Hoppstock, CD, Signum, 1995) Into Darkness (Sequenza, CD, Neuma, 1998)
- This is How it is, Walking song, Leaping Dance, Concerto for Piano and Wind Instruments, Untitled (Netherlands Wind Ensemble, cond. Wim Steinmann and Daniel Harding, CD, Chandos, 1999)
- Cicada, Duets (Mathilda Hornsveld, Jill Richards, CD, Black Box, 2000)
- This is How it is (Netherlands Wind Ensemble, cond. Wim Steinmann, CD, CMC, 2001)
- String Quartet No. 2: 'Hunting; Gathering', String Quartet No. 6, String Quartet No. 1: 'White Man Sleeps' (The Duke Quartet, CD, Black Box, 2002)
- White Man Sleeps (Guitar Quartet Version) (Dublin Guitar Quartet, CD, Grelslate Records, 2005)
- Piano Trio (Fidelio Trio, CD, NMC, 2008)
- Walking Song (David Adams, CD, All Write Music, 2008)
- Akrodha, Asange, She Who Sleeps with a Small Blanket (Jonny Axelsson, CD, 2008)
- The Partenheimer Project (Birmingham Contemporary Music Group, CD, Ikon Gallery/Kunstmuseum Bonn, 2008)
- Four Guitars (Dublin Guitar Quartet, CD, CMC, 2009)

== Filmography ==
- Dance Films by Adam Roberts (Duke Quartet, Kevin Volans, DVD, The Jonathan Burrows Group, 1995)
- Zeno at 4am. (Sontonga Quartet, Pumeza Matshikiza, Lwazi Ncube, William Kentridge, DVD, Marian Goodman Gallery, 2002)
- Evidenti: A Film Conceived By Sylvie Guillem (Duke Quartet, DVD, NVC Arts, 1995)

== Selected compositions ==
=== Stage ===
- Correspondences, Dance Opera (1990)
- The Man with Footsoles of Wind, Chamber opera (1993)

=== Orchestra ===
- One Hundred Frames (1991)
- Concerto for Double Orchestra (2001)
- Strip-Weave for Orchestra (2002–03)
- Symphony: Daar Kom die Alibama (2010)

=== Soloist with orchestra ===
- Concerto for Piano and Wind Instruments (1995)
- Cello Concerto (1997)
- Trio Concerto (2005)
- Piano Concerto No. 2 'Atlantic Crossing' (2006)
- Piano Concerto No. 3 (2010)
- Chakra for 3 percussionists and Orchestra (2011)
- Piano Concerto no. 4 (2014)
- Concerto for Uilleann Pipes and large Orchestra (2016/17)
- Concerto for solo Percussion and ensemble (2012)

=== Chamber music ===
- Matepe (1980)
- White Man Sleeps (1982)
- Walking Song (1984)
- Leaping Dance (1984)
- Kneeling Dance (1984 rev. 1987)
- String Quartet No. 1 'White Man Sleeps' (1986)
- String Quartet No. 2 'Hunting: Gathering'(1987)
- String Quartet No. 3 'The Songlines' (1988 rev. 1993)
- Chevron (1990)
- Mbira (1991)
- Cicada (1994)
- String Quartet No. 5 'Dancers on a Plane' (1994)
- Untitled (1996)
- String Quartet No. 6 (2000)
- 1000 bars (2002)
- Chakra for 3 percussionists (2003)
- Piano Trio (2002, rev. 2005)
- Shiva Dances (2006)
- The Partenheimer Project (2007)
- Mr. Handel's Return (2008)
- Violin: Piano (2008)
- Viola: Piano (2008)
- Cello: Piano (2009)
- Trumpet, Vibe, Cello, Piano (2009)
- No Translation (2009)
- Piano Trio No. 2 (2009)
- String Quartet no. 11 (2013)
- Looping Point (2012)
- Turning Point (2013)
- Calefaccion (2013)
- Matepe for Calefax (2013)
- 7 Flutes (2014)
- Abhaya (2014)
- 7 Bass Winds (2015)
- 4 Marimbas (2015)
- String Quartet no. 12 (2015)
- perc : piano 1 (2015)
- Akrodha 3 (2015)
- for Bob (2015)
- perc : piano 2 (2016)
- C.Roll.A.eS.H. (2016)
- cello:piano 2 (2016)
- Spoor (2017)
- Piano Trio no. 3 (2017)
- Seven Clarinets and One Flute (2017)
- clarinet:violin:piano (with CPE) (2017)
- Blackbird:Blackbird 1–4 for 2 pianos (2018)

=== Solo instrumental ===
- clarinet:solo (2015)
- L'Africaine (2016)

=== Solo percussion ===
- She Who Sleeps with a Small Blanket (1985)
- Asanga (1997)
- Akrodha (1998)

=== Solo piano ===
- Three Structural Etudes (2004)
- Three Rhythmic Etudes (2003)
- Piano Etudes Nos. 7 & 8 (2008)
- Piano Etude No. 9 (2008)
- 3 Books of Piano pieces for 'Young' Players (2012)
- PMB Impromptu (2014)
- Piano Etude No. 10 (2015, withdrawn)
- Piano Etude No. 11 (2015, rev. 2018)
- Piano Etude No. 12 (2015, rev. 2018)
- Marabi Nights (2016)
- 53,73369155794372 notes a second, for Clare for midi keyboard (2016)

=== Vocal ===
- Gloso a lo Divino (2006)
- Canciones del Alma (2009)
- 3 Xhosa songs (2012)
- The Mountain that Left (2013)
