= Greet =

Greet may refer to:

- greeting, an act of communication
- Greet, Birmingham, West Midlands, England
- Greet (communication), a way for human beings to intentionally communicate awareness of each other's presence
- GREET Model
- River Greet, a river in Nottinghamshire
- In Scottish English, to greet is to cry

People with the given name Greet, a Dutch short form of Margaretha (Margaret):

- Greet Daems (born 1980), Belgian politician
- Greet Galliard (1926–2019), Dutch swimmer
- Greet Grottendieck (born 1943), Dutch sculptor
- Greet Hellemans (born 1959), Dutch rower
- Greet Hofmans (1894–1968), Dutch faith healer
- Greet van Norden (1911–1963), Dutch swimmer

People with the surname Greet:

- Ben Greet (1857–1936), Shakespearean actor, director, and impresario
- Christopher Greet (21st century), Sri Lankan radio personality
- Clare Greet (1871–1939), English film actress
- William Greet (1851–1914), British theatre manager
- W. Cabell Greet (1901–1972), American philologist and professor of English
