= Ospeldijk =

- Village
- Location in the Netherlands Location in the province of Limburg in the Netherlands
- Coordinates: 51°19′13″N 5°48′49″E
- Country: Netherlands
- Province: Limburg
- Municipality: Nederweert

Area
  - Total: 0.90 km^{2} (0.35 sq mi)
- Elevation: 32 m (105 ft)

Population (450)
  - Total: 3,730
  - Density: 4,100/km^{2} (11,000/sq mi)
- Time zone: UTC+1 (CET)
  - Summer (DST): UTC+2 (CEST)
- Postal code: 6035
- Dialing code: 0495

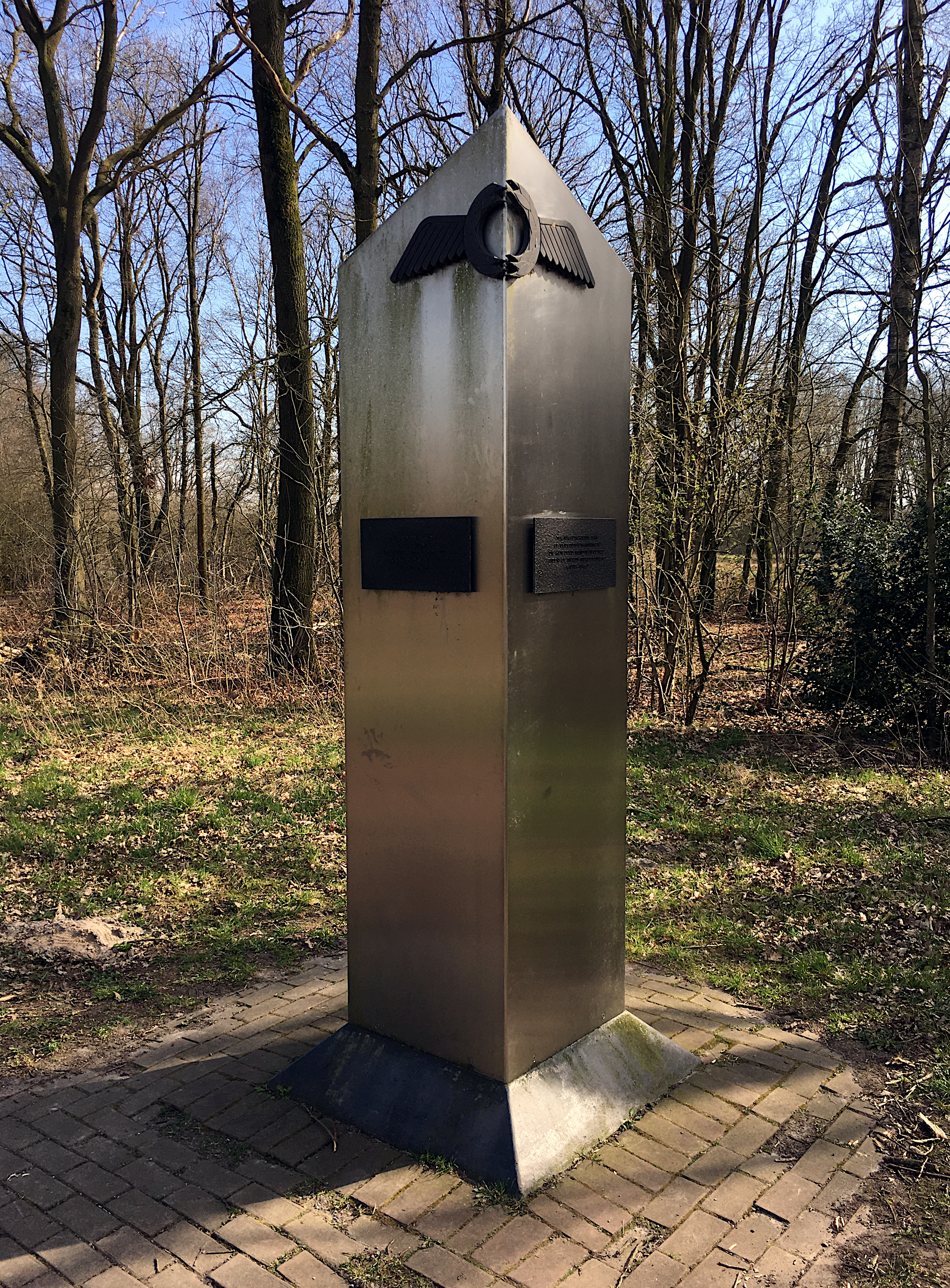
War monument in Ospeldijk

Ospeldijk is a village in the Dutch province of Limburg. It is a part of the municipality of Nederweert, and lies about 11 km northeast of Weert.

The village was first mentioned in 1978 as Meijelse Dijk, and means "dike near Ospel".

The Holy Spirit Church was a modern aisleless church built between 1957 and 1958. The church was demolished in 2008 and replaced by houses.

Ospeldijk is an access point to De Groote Peel National Park.
