= Sorsa =

Sorsa is a Finnish surname. Notable people with the surname include:

- Kalevi Sorsa (1930–2004), Finnish politician
- Riki Sorsa (1952–2016), Finnish singer
- Sebastian Sorsa (born 1984), Finnish footballer
