= June Schneider =

South African musicologist and composer (1939–2020)

- Born: June Benjamin; 15 June 1939; Johannesburg, South Africa
- Died: 22 July 2020 (aged 81); New York City, New York, U.S.
- Education: University of the Witwatersrand (BMus Hons, PhD)
- Occupations: Musicologist; Composer; Lecturer
- Years active: 1961–2020
- Known for: Research on Richard Strauss; contributions to electronic music; music therapy; adult education
- Spouse: David Schneider (m. 1960s)
- Children: 2

June Schneider (née Benjamin; 15 June 1939 – 22 July 2020) was a South African musicologist, composer and lecturer. She is known for her research on Richard Strauss, contributions to electronic music, and her involvement in music therapy and adult education in South Africa during the 1960s and 1970s. A champion of music and dance, esteemed professor, and critic she obtained her PhD from the University of the Witwatersrand at the age of 23—the youngest doctoral candidate in the university's history.

== Early life and education ==
June Schneider was born on 15 June 1939 in Johannesburg. She studied piano with Isador Epstein and graduated from the University of the Witwatersrand with a Bachelor of Music with Honours (BMus Hons) in 1960. She was granted exemption from a master's degree and proceeded directly to doctoral studies under Professor Friedrich Hartmann.

In 1959, she won the Julius Robinson Scholarship, which allowed her to travel overseas in 1961–1962 to conduct research on the composer Richard Strauss. During this time, she met Strauss's son in Garmisch-Partenkirchen and studied many original manuscripts and papers. Her doctoral thesis, completed in 1962, was titled Devices employed by Richard Strauss in his opera Salomé in the service of the poetic idea.

== Career ==
Schneider held multiple academic and advisory roles throughout her career. From 1961 to 1962, she was a lecturer and adviser to the African Music and Drama Association. Between 1962 and 1963, she worked as an honorary part-time music therapist at Tara–a psychiatric hospital in Johannesburg. Beginning in 1965, she lectured at the Institute of Adult Studies.

In 1967, Schneider was awarded a British Council grant to travel to London at the invitation of Hephzibah Menuhin-Hauser, to assist in a survey on creativity in music. Her work in electronic music, public lectures, and published articles contributed to her reputation as an independent thinker. She contributed regularly to South African journals "To the Point" and "Artlook", writing about contemporary music, as well as previewing and reviewing concerts for the Sunday Times.

She joined the Music Department of her alma mater University of the Witwatersrand in 1971, lecturing in musicology and composition. Her students included composers Kevin Volans and Michael Blake. Schneider and her family emigrated to the United States in 1977 for reasons of conscience, having been critical of South Africa's apartheid system and believing in the liberal traditions of academic freedom and advancement by merit. They settled in Atlanta and became U.S. citizens in 1983.

She taught on the music faculties of Emory University and Mercer University in Atlanta, Georgia. There she developed the exhibition “Sensation” at the High Museum of Art alongside Pamela Bray, for the inauguration of the new building designed by Richard Meier. Framed as a “fun‑filled learning and doing experience,” the show deliberately moved beyond traditional, purely visual displays by inviting visitors to engage all five senses. Its centrepiece installations included a walk‑in eyeball (a camera obscura demonstrating vision), a climb‑on, slide‑down ear sculpture that revealed how sound travels through the eardrum and inner bones, and an oversized model of lips and tongue mapping the four basic taste zones. By emphasising hands‑on, participatory interaction with art, music, science and technology, “Sensation” sought to dissolve the mind/body divide typical of modern museums and foreground the visitor's own sensory experience. Schneider also co‑founded the Children's Museum of Atlanta, and, after relocating to New York, she helped revamp the Children's Museum of Manhattan, curating exhibitions such as a retrospective on the artist Maira Kalman.

Schneider also worked as a dance critic for The Atlanta Journal‑Constitution, and served on the boards of American Ballet Theatre and Complexions Contemporary Ballet.

== Writings and compositions ==
=== Articles ===
- “Stravinsky and Picasso - a parallel and a parable...” Ars Nova, Vol. 6, No. 2, August 1974. https://doi.org/10.1080/03796487408566363
- "How Musical is Man? John Blacking. Book review." African Studies, Vol. 35, No. 2, 1976. https://doi.org/10.1080/00020187608707472
- "Music, Noise and Hearing Damage." South African Medical Journal, 6 November 1976.
- "Heroic Vitalism in the Nineteenth Century: Richard Wagner." Unpublished conference paper, n.d.

=== Selected compositions ===
- Encounter Time and Space (1971; presented at the Planetarium in Johannesburg).
- Encounter 2 (1972; arrangement of Encounter Time and Space, presented at the Planetarium in Johannesburg).
- Nongquawuse (1973; electronic music for ballet, with live music composed by John MacBeth and Nick Pickard, scored by Johnny Boshoff for 11-piece rock group; commissioned by Performing Arts Council of the Transvaal).
- The Assassination of Shaka (1974; electronic music for a multimedia presentation with woodcut paintings by Cecil Skotnes and poems by Stephen Gray, narrated by Stanley Baker).
- Soundaround (1979; text piece for flute, trumpet, percussion and other instruments - only flute and trumpet parts extant). Composed for Soundaround, an environment event, Emory Creative Arts Week Festival 1979.
- Time Piece (early 1980s; for three choirs, metronomes, and electronic tapes). Composed for the Sensation exhibition, Museum of High Art, Atlanta.
- Seven Exits (no date; music for dance)

== Death and legacy ==
Schneider died in New York on 22 July 2020, aged 81. She was actively involved in establishing the University of the Witwatersrand Fund Inc.; Vice‑Chancellor Adam Habib acknowledged her “enormous contribution to her alma mater.”

Composer Kevin Volans (BMus 1972) has recalled that Schneider encouraged him to write his undergraduate thesis on Karlheinz Stockhausen—and later dedicated his works Looping Point (2012) and Turning Point (2013) to her.

She was the honorary patron of composer Michael Blake's Orion Ensemble (1975–1977), which promoted the performance and composition of contemporary music in South Africa, and Blake dedicated two works to her: Night Music (1977) for chamber ensemble and Ixilongo (2021) for horn, 12 off-stage horns and ambient tape.

In November 2024, Hoofstraat Conceptual in the Swartland town Riebeek-Kasteel presented Soundaround, a mini-festival of new music curated by Blake. Schneider's 1977 composition Soundaround was performed alongside Ulrich Süße's Musicians plus One (1998) and Blake's early Five Pieces for Piccolo and Tuba (1971), with musicians placed among the audience as part of the aleatoric performance. The event was recorded for release on CD by the Africa Open Institute in 2025.
