= Margo =

Margo may refer to:

== People ==
- Margo (actress) (1917–1985), Mexican-American actress and dancer
- Margo (singer), Irish singer
- Margo (given name), including a list of people and characters with the name

== Places and jurisdictions ==
- 1175 Margo, an outer main-belt asteroid discovered in 1930
- Dasht-e Margo, a desert in Afghanistan
- Margo, Nicosia, a former village west of Pyrogi, Northern Cyprus
- Margo, Saskatchewan, Canada
- Margo Recreation Site, Saskatchewan, Canada

== Other uses ==
- Margo (soap), an Indian brand of herbal soap
- Margo, a compact version of Margolin MCM pistol
- USS Margo (SP-870), a United States Navy patrol boat in commission from 1917 to 1918
- Margo (fly), an African genus of flies

== See also ==
- Margaux (disambiguation)
- Margot (disambiguation)
- Marguerite (disambiguation)
- Margaret
