= Wessem-Nederweert Canal =

Canal in the Netherlands

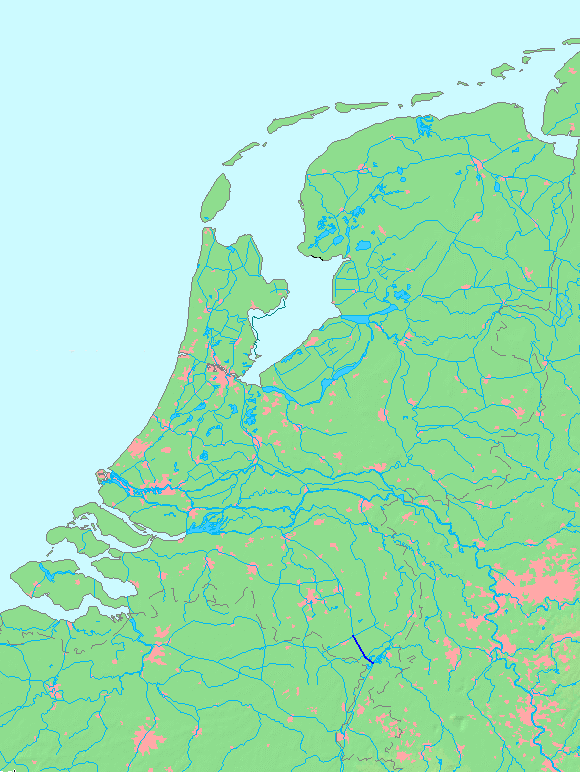
- The Wessem-Nederweert Canal
- Country: Netherlands

Specifications
- Length: 17 km (11 miles)
- Status: Operational

History
- Date completed: 1929

Geography
- Start point: Meuse
- End point: Zuid-Willemsvaart, Nederweert
- Beginning coordinates: 51.164537°N 5.894026°E
- Ending coordinates: 51.275142°N 5.759467°E

Wessem-Nederweert Canal is a canal connecting the Zuid-Willemsvaart at Nederweert to the Meuse near Wessem. Here it meets the wide Juliana Canal that connects to Maastricht.

== Characteristics ==
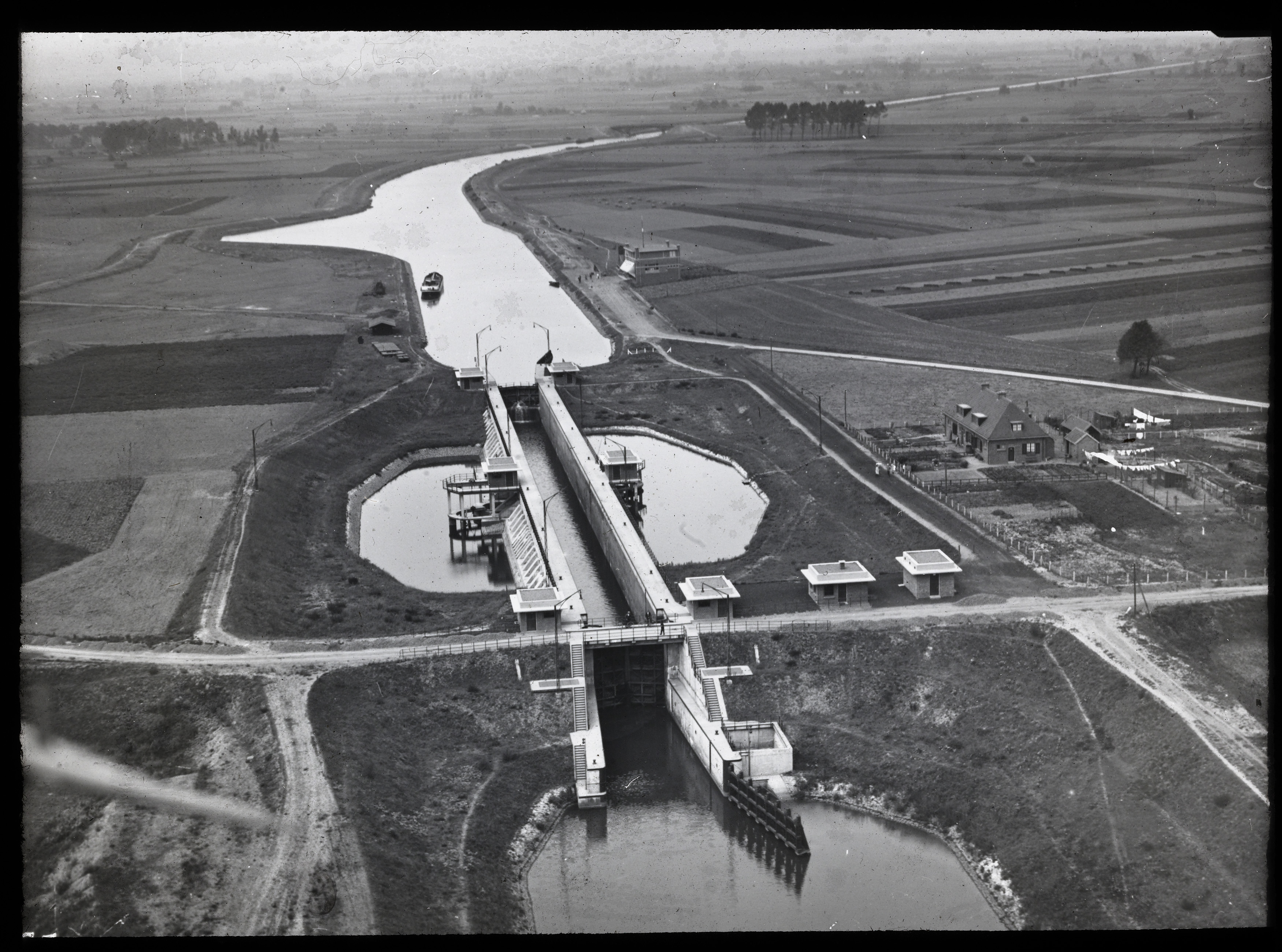
Storage basins at the old lock of Panheel

=== Dimensions ===
The Wessem-Nederweert Canal is 17 km long, 2.5 meter deep, and varies in width from 30 to 50 meter. The maximum dimensions for ships on the canal are: length 96 m, beam 9,5 m, draft 2,10 m. This is CEMT IV with a draft limitation of 2.10 m.

=== Structures ===
Panheel Lock is the only lock on the canal. It is a double lock consisting of the original Panheel Lock, and a more recent larger lock next to it. The canal pound close to the Meuse has a much lower level than that west of Panheel Lock.

There are 9 bridges over the canal. The air draft of the bridges is about 5 meter.

== Context and Plans ==
=== The South Limburg coal fields ===
During the Industrial Revolution, the Netherlands lacked iron as well as coal. In South Limburg, it had rich coal deposits, but almost none of these could be exploited due to problems with groundwater. After technical difficulties were overcome, coal mining quickly became a serious activity from 1893 onwards.

It was expected that coal mining would lead to industrialization of South Limburg. However, transporting bulk cargo to and from South Limburg was expensive, because it depended on rail transport, and the shallow Meuse. In the economic center of the Netherlands, the Limburg coal would be more expensive than German coal, because the latter was transported at very low cost by large ships that descended the Rhine.

=== Canalization of the Meuse ===
The plans that led to improving the Meuse for shipping were known as the Canalization of the Meuse Kanalisatie van de Maas. The first plans for the Meuse consisted of dredging and removing all kind of obstacles. North of Maasbracht canalization was thought to be an effective solution. Between Maastricht and Maasbracht a lateral canal was designed in 1913. This design had locks suitable for a Rhine ship of 2,000 tons, with a length of 200 m, beam of 12 m and draft of 2.80 m.

In 1914 the canalization between Maasbracht and Grave was brought on the government budget. Before this was granted, an investigation was done whether it would not be cheaper to dig a canal from Maasbracht to the Zuid-Willemsvaart in combination with an upgrade of the latter. This alternative proved more expensive, but it was found that the construction of a (smaller) canal from Wessem to Nederweert would be useful. It would benefit North-Brabant and Zeeland, and while the canalization was in progress, ships of up to 400 ton could transport coal via the Zuid-Willemsvaart, and the Wilhelmina Canal. When the latter was ready, the Wessem-Nederweert Canal would shorten the route from Maasbracht to Tilburg from 220 km to 90 km.

=== Final plan ===
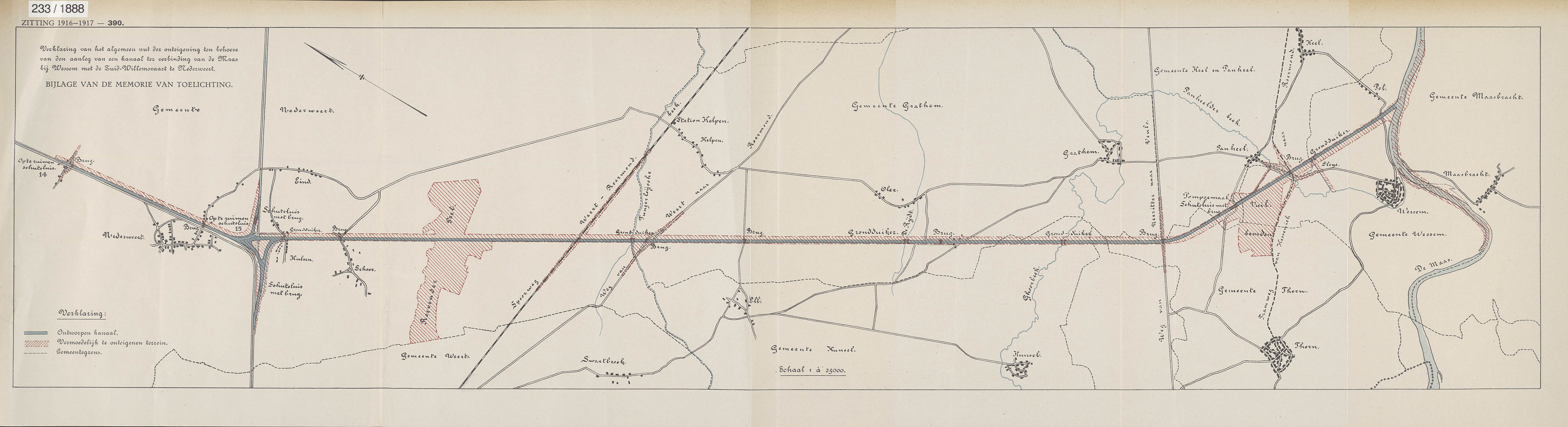
1916 map for compulsory purchase of land

In 1917 the design of the Wessem-Nederweert Canal was ready, and a law for compulsory purchase was brought to parliament. The canal would run from Wessem to Nederweert, where it met the Zuid-Willemsvaart. Near the Meuse Panheel Lock would control the water level in the canal. On the Zuid-Willemsvaart, locks 14 and 15 would be demolished. A new Lock 15 would be built on the Zuid-Willemsvaart just upstream of the junction with the Wessem-Nederweert Canal. Another lock was planned at the start of the Noordervaart. These three locks were planned to get a lock chamber of 65 m long, a passage width of 7.50 m, and a depth of 2.50 m. The canal itself would be 30 m wide at the surface. A the bottom it would be 16 m wide, and deep 2.70 m in the center, and 2.50 m at the edges. Air draft for the fixed bridges would be 5.20 m. The compulsory purchase did take a later expansion to 2,000 tons ships into account.

In summer, the Meuse was very dry, because Belgium used most of its water in irrigation projects. It was therefore necessary to save water. The biggest loss of water on the canal was caused by the operation of the locks. Therefore, Panheel Lock would get storage basins, which reduced its water consumption by 60%, leaving a projected average loss of 0.54 m^{3}/s. From the air, this led to a very typical view of a lock hemmed in by two basins.

== History ==
=== Construction ===
After preliminary work, construction of the Wessem-Nederweert Canal got up to steam in 1918. In 1925, the work of actually digging the canal was started. On 2 April 1928 the canal was opened for shipping.

=== Of national importance ===
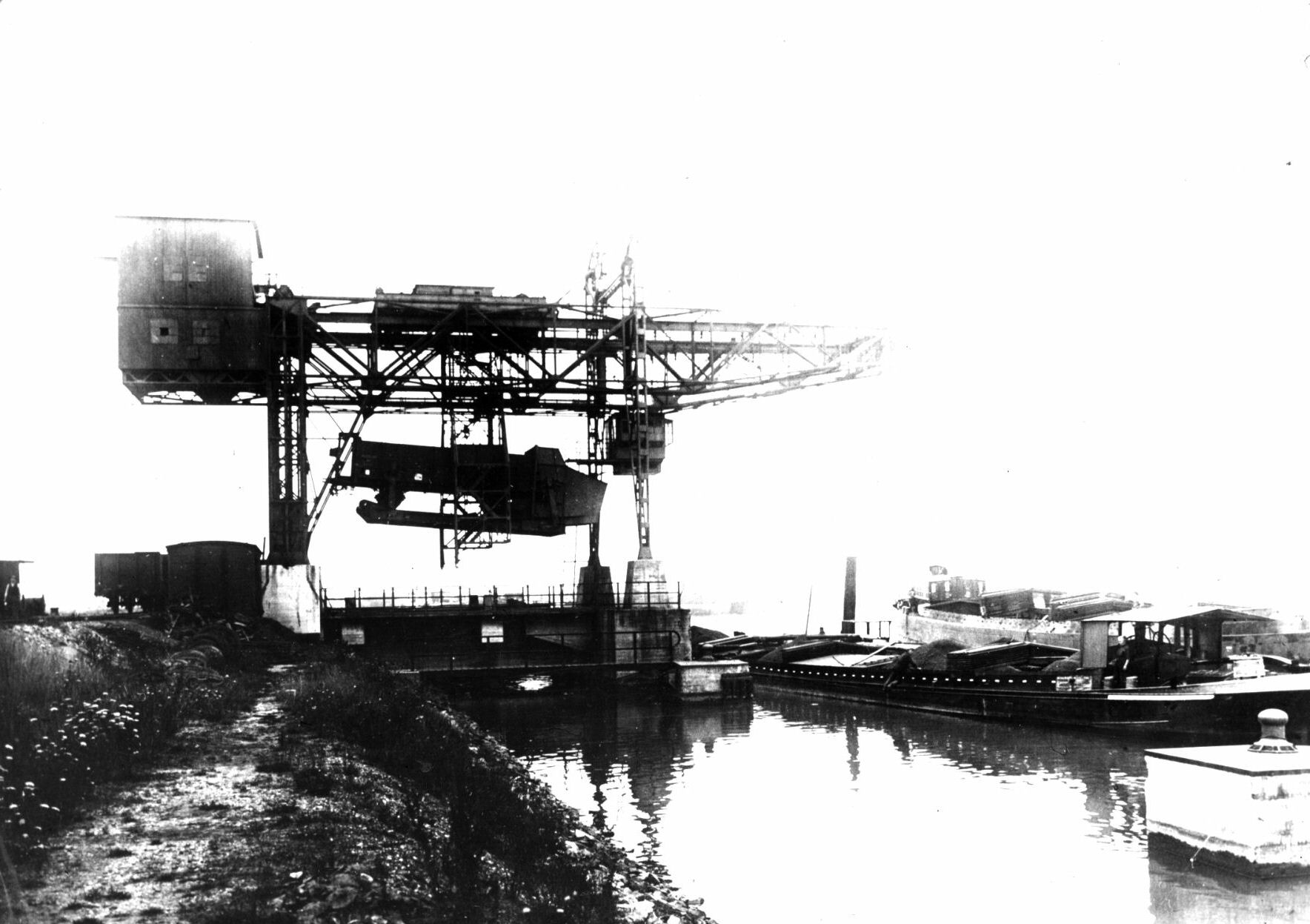
A coal trestle on the Juliana Canal

Almost as soon as it was opened, the Wessem-Nederweert Canal became busy, because it made the shortcut of the Meuse even shorter between 's-Hertogenbosch and Maasbracht. The opening of the canalized Meuse between Maasbracht and Grave in October 1929 made the Wessem-Nederweert Canal a transport artery of national importance. The traditional route from Rotterdam to Maastricht and Liège was over the Zuid-Willemsvaart that started in 's-Hertogenbosch, and ended in Maastricht. Now, skippers began to use the canalized Meuse and the Wessem-Nederweert Canal to only use the upper part of the Zuid-Willemsvaart, which stretched from Nederweert to Maastricht.

The canalized Meuse between Maasbracht and Grave also connected to the Maas–Waal Canal, which had been opened in October 1927. This connected the Rhine to the Meuse close to the German border. In a few years traffic on this new canal grew from 5,000 ships in 1928 to 24,000 ships in the crisis year 1931. This generated new traffic on the Wessem-Nederweert Canal, e.g. coal barges from the Ruhr.

The original idea to create all these works, the transport of Limburg coal, started slowly. In Maasbracht a coal trestle kolentip was made, where rail cars could be tipped in order to load coal into ships. However, the national railways, which were in part owned by the state, were in financial trouble. In June 1928 the government was involved in a two-year contract between the railways and the coal mines, which severely limited use of the coal trestle. In July 1929 the coal trestle was finally taken into use, with Rijkswaterstaat itself providing rail transport to Maasbracht.

As foreseen, the 1935 opening of the Juliana Canal put an end to the heyday of the Wessem-Nederweert Canal. The traffic from the Ruhr to Maastricht now had a better connection. Navigation from the western parts of the Netherlands to Maastricht could start to use big ships that did not fit the Wessem-Nederweert Canal. On the other hand, small ships that used the Zuid-Willemsvaart got a shorter route to Maastricht, and could use the Wessem-Nederweert Canal instead of the upper part of the Zuid-Willemsvaart. Also, some traffic to Liège, especially German coal continued to use the canal because of the high toll at the Lanaye Locks.

=== World War II ===
During the May 1940 German invasion of the Netherlands all bridges on the Wessem-Nederweert Canal were destroyed. The lock at Panheel and Lock 15 at Nederweert were damaged. By September 1940 navigation resumed. In November 1944 the western allies crossed the canal at several places.

=== Gravel ===
After World War II, the extraction of gravel on the Meuse expanded to an industrial schale, especially for making concrete. The canal became important for the transport of this gravel grind.

=== 1966 improvement plan ===
In 1965 the Wessem-Nederweert Canal was busier than any part of the Zuid-Willemsvaart. Compared to the connected canalized Meuse and Juliana Canal, it was less relevant. The number of ships on the canal was about two-thirds of that on those waters, and in tonnage transport was only about a quarter or a third of that on the canalized Meuse and Juliana Canal. A remarkable fact about shipping on the canal was that less than 5% of the ships headed in the direction of Maastricht was loaded.

In 1966, the maintenance situation of the Zuid-Willemsvaart was problematic, with almost all locks needing urgent replacement. Therefore, Rijkswaterstaat came up with an overall plan to modernize the Zuid-Willemsvaart, and the connected Wessem-Nederweert Canal. The idea was to make the canal suitable for fully loaded 600 tons ships, and occasional use by 1,350 ton ships. For the Wessem-Nederweert Canal the plan foresaw that it had to be dredged out 30–50 cm, and that a bridged had to be lifted to allow a higher air draft. At Panheel the lock gates would have to be made a bit higher. In a second phase of the plan, a new much larger lock for 1,200 tons ships would have to be built next to the existing Panheel Lock.

=== The 1982 upgrade plan ===
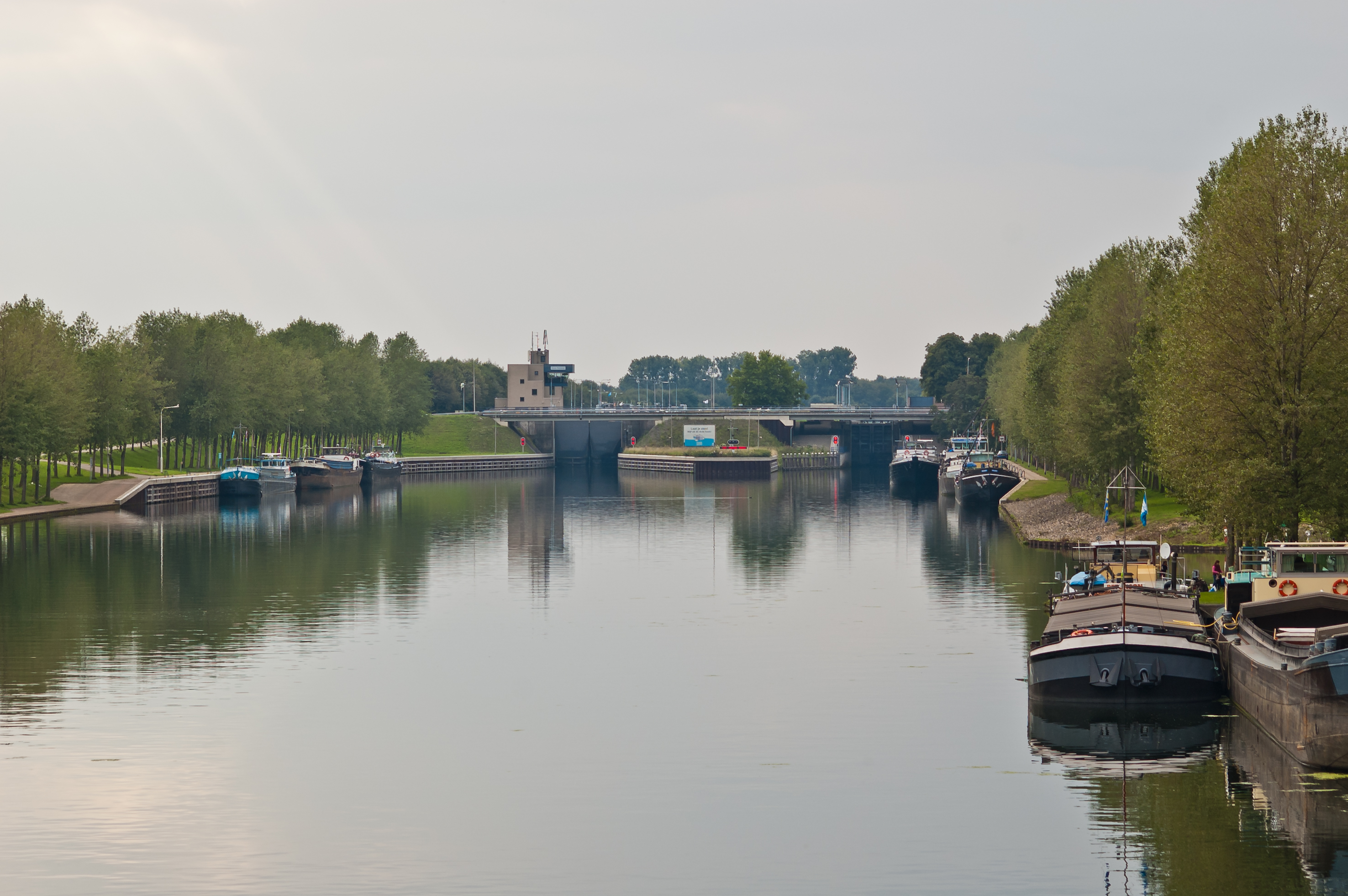
The current double lock at Panheel

In October 1982 the minister of Transport and Water Management announced his decision to upgrade the canal. This led to a more elaborate plan to upgrade the canal to CEMT class IV. It was expected that if Belgium also upgraded, traffic on the canal would grow by about 60%, because part of the traffic to Belgium over the Juliana Canal would be rerouted over the upper part of the Zuid-Willemsvaart.

In 1984 a culvert for the Uffelse Beek was replaced to allow greater depth of the canal. Actual execution of the plans started with the construction of the second Panheel Lock in April 1986. In October 1986 an 89 m long culvert zinker was placed to channel the Tungelroysche Beek below the canal. By May 1987 construction of the new Panheel Lock was well underway.

In 1987 the whole upgrade plan was halted, and postponed by 5 years. Construction of the second Panheel Lock would be left unfinished.

By 1990, the canal became part of environmental considerations about giving preference to water transport over road transport. Minister Hanja Maij-Weggen promoted the canal, and the part of the Zuid-Willemsvaart that connected to Belgium, to a national waterway. This meant that the plans were again to be executed. In 1992 the new lock at Panheel was finished. However, the original 1966 plan called for a canal depth of 3.50 m. Therefore, only part of the plans were executed.

=== Current status ===
The more elaborate 1985 plan for the Wessem-Nederweert Canal specified some works on the bridges over the canal. It called for making the Kelperbrug 0.73 m higher. The air draft of the Kelpen railroad bridge would have to be heightened by 0.20 m to 5.95 m, and a new Schoorbrug was planned.

In 2008, a new higher Schoorbrug was opened. In 2016, Limburg province and Rijkwaterstaat reached an initial agreement for a new Kelperbrug. The new bridge would have to allow greater use of pushed barges.

Name	Passage width	Air draft	Remarks
Polbrug	16.30 m	6.70 m	
Trambrug	13.66 m	6.80 m	
Panheel Lock bridge	12.60 m	8.90 m	Largest of its two passages
Napoleonsbrug	33.00 m	6.20 m	North and South
Vosbergerbrug	23.60 m	6.40 m	
Ellbrug	23.60 m	6.40 m	
Kelperbrug	31.43 m	4.80 m	
Railroad bridge Kelpen	32.55 m	5.40 m	
Schoorbrug	21.75 m	5.40 m	
