= Friedrich Hartmann =

Austrian-South African music theorist and educator

- Born: 1900; Vienna, Austria
- Died: 1973 (aged 72–73); Vienna, Austria
- Education: Staatsakademie für Musik, Vienna
- Occupations: Music theorist, Educator, Composer
- Known for: Fully-chromaticised scales, Tonal theory
- Notable work: Harmonielehre (1934), Music Education in the University (1956)

Friedrich Hartmann (1900–1973) was an Austrian-South African music theorist and educator. He held academic positions in Austria before emigrating to South Africa in 1939, where he significantly influenced music education and theory.

== Early life and education ==
Hartmann was born and educated in Vienna, Austria. He studied under Joseph Marx and Max Springer and held positions at the New Conservatorium of Vienna (1927–1928) and the Volksmusikhochschule (1929–1930). In 1931, he was appointed as a professor at the Staatsakademie für Musik, a position he held until 1938.

== Emigration to South Africa ==
Following the Anschluss in 1938, Hartmann left Austria under complex circumstances. The commonly accepted narrative is that he fled due to his wife’s half-Jewish parentage and his vocal criticism of Adolf Hitler’s regime. However, some sources suggest that he may have offered to divorce his wife in order to remain in Austria. His criticism of Hitler was also the result of his active support of Austro-Fascism.

== Career in South Africa ==
Hartmann arrived in South Africa in 1939 and was appointed as a senior lecturer and head of the music department at Rhodes University in 1940. His appointment was facilitated by Vice-Chancellor John Smeath Thomas without a formal selection process. His tenure at Rhodes was marked by controversy, particularly surrounding his relationship with colleagues and allegations of academic misconduct and personal impropriety. These accusations resulted in multiple government inquiries and court cases, though Hartmann was ultimately exonerated.

In 1955, Hartmann joined the University of the Witwatersrand as its head of the music department. Here he considerably expanded the department’s postgraduate research output. He also, in vain, continued earlier attempts to establish a conservatoire for music located in the department. He returned to Vienna in 1961.

== Contributions to music theory ==
Hartmann is known for his theoretical work, particularly his belief that "all compositional techniques from the early part of the twentieth century, including twelve-tone technique, are situated within a disguised or diffused expression of tonality". This theory was first expounded in his 1934 publication Harmonielehre and reiterated in his 1956 inaugural lecture at the University of the Witwatersrand.

His ideas, though implemented by his student Bernard van der Linde at the University of South Africa, did not gain widespread acceptance within South African music theory.

A key part of Hartmann’s theoretical contributions was his concept of fully-chromaticised scales, which he used to analyze both traditional and atonal works. His theories were central to a South African musicological debate in the late 1970s, particularly concerning Arnold Schoenberg’s Op. 11/1. The debate, involving musicologists Henk Temmingh and Bernard van der Linde, highlighted contrasting views on the validity of Hartmann’s tonally biased analyses.

== Later life and legacy ==
After his return to Vienna in 1961, Hartmann continued his academic work as deputy head of the Musikhochschule. Despite his contributions to South African music education, his theories remained relatively obscure. He is remembered for his role in shaping South African musicology and for the controversies that surrounded his academic career.

== Selected works ==
Hartmann, F. (1934). Harmonielehre. Vienna: Universal-Edition.

Hartmann, F. (1956). Music Education in the University. Johannesburg: Wits University Press.
