= Margaretha von Bahr =

Finnish ballet dancer and ballet master

Professori Margaretha von Bahr
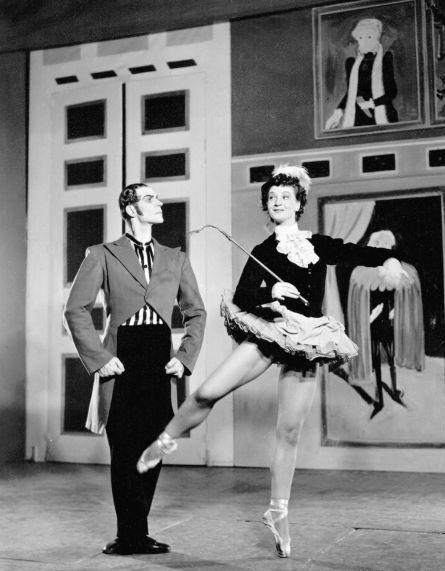
- Margaretha von Bahr (shown here with Klaus Salin), in her 'signature role' in the ballet adaptation of Miss Julie
- Born: Maria Elisabet Margaretha Wasenius; 11 December 1921; Helsinki, Finland
- Died: 21 February 2016 (aged 94); Helsinki, Finland
- Spouses: Lars von Bahr (m. 1942; div. 1948) Esko Sorsa (m. 1952; died 1991)
- Children: Robert von Bahr (b. 1943), Riki Sorsa (b. 1952 — d. 2016)

Margaretha von Bahr (née Wasenius, from 1952 von Bahr-Sorsa; 11 December 1921 — 21 February 2016) was a Finnish ballet dancer, choreographer and pedagog. She has been described as a leading ballet star of the post-war era in Finland.

== Career ==
=== Dance ===
Starting ballet lessons from the age of seven, Margaretha Wasenius went on to train at the Ballet of Finland (later to become the Finnish National Ballet) school from 1928, and was eventually attached to the company's corps de ballet in 1938.

She spent the war years in Sweden, studying and working at the Royal Dramatic Theatre in Stockholm. Upon returning to Finland, she was in 1946 appointed principal dancer, which position she held until her retirement in 1964.

During her time at the National Ballet, von Bahr danced nearly all the female lead roles in the company's repertoire.

Von Bahr toured extensively in Europe and North America in the late 1950s and throughout the 1960s, both as a soloist and with the National Ballet company.

=== Choreography ===
After retiring from her active dance career, von Bahr studied choreography, dance notation and pedagogy in Leningrad and London. She subsequently set up her own ballet school, became active in various dance-related organisations, as well as working increasingly on choreography.

Her notable choreographies for the Finnish National Ballet include:

- Kiusaukset (music by Einojuhani Rautavaara), premiered 1973
- Scaramouche (music by Jean Sibelius), premiered 1974
- Double Indeed (music by George de Godzinsky)

She also choreographed for the Finnish TV and the Helsinki City Theatre, among others.

In 1974, von Bahr won the choreography prize at the Varna International Ballet Competition.

== Awards and honours ==
In 1957, von Bahr was awarded the Pro Finlandia medal of the Order of the Lion of Finland.

In 1979, she received the honorary title of Professori from President Urho Kekkonen.

== Personal life ==
Maria Elisabet Margaretha Wasenius was born to a musical family: her father was the cellist, conductor and composer Carl Wasenius, and her grandfather the well-known music critic Karl Fredrik Wasenius; there were many other musical figures in the family. Her father was a Swedish-speaking Finn, and her mother, Sonja née Gosiowitsch, Russian.

During her time working in Sweden, she met and married engineer Lars von Bahr in 1942. The couple had one son, the Swedish music producer and founder of the BIS Records record label, Robert von Bahr (1943—). The marriage ended in divorce six years later, but she kept the von Bahr name professionally.

In 1952, Margaretha von Bahr married business executive Esko Sorsa. They also had one son, the Finnish singer Richard 'Riki' Sorsa (1952—2016).

In 1987, to mark the 50th anniversary of her professional career, von Bahr set up a foundation in her name, which supports dance art.
