= Nederweert =

Nederweert Ni-jwieërt
- Municipality
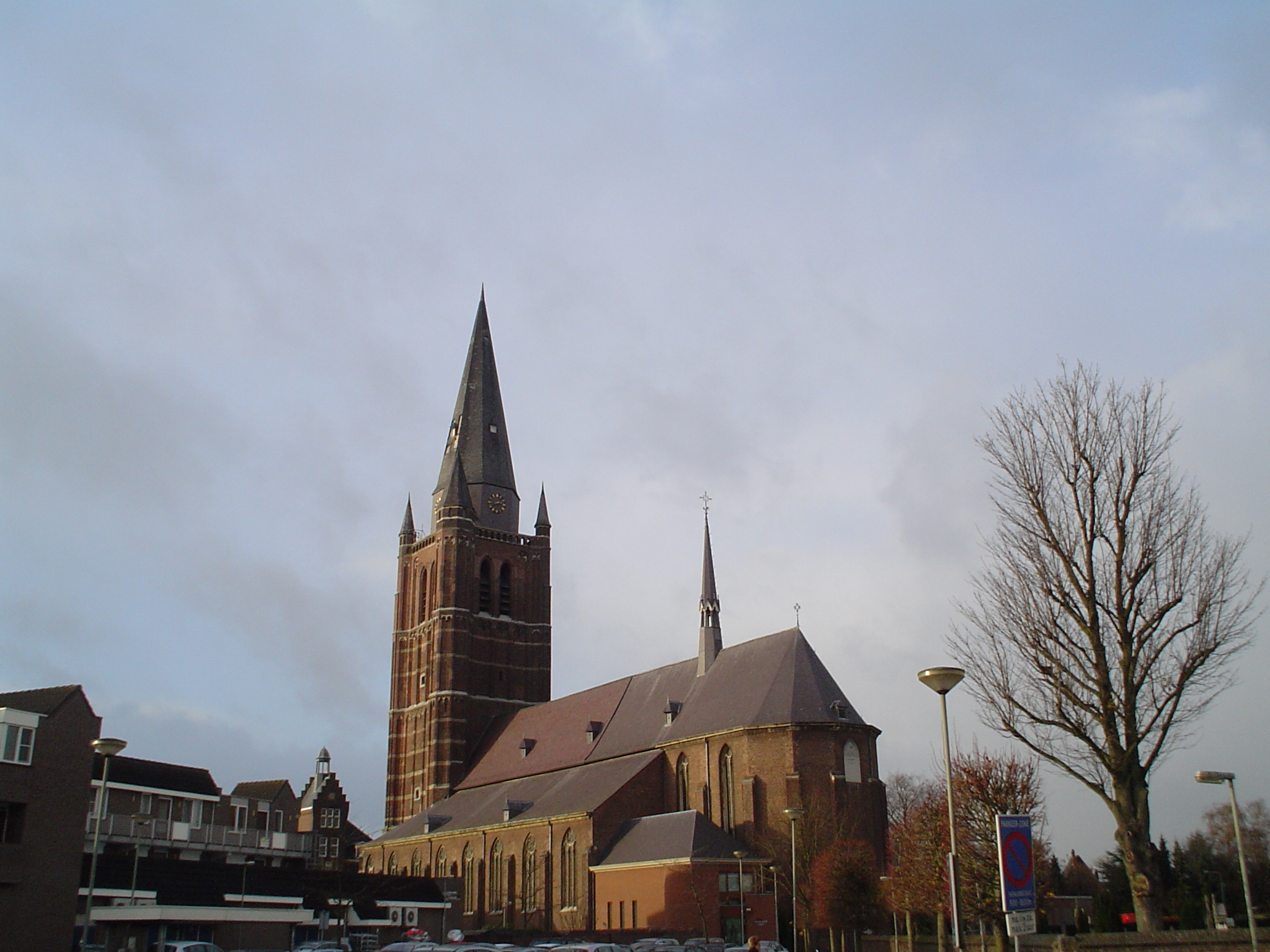
- Saint Lambert church in Nederweert

- Flag Coat of arms

- Location in Limburg
- Coordinates: 51°17′N 5°45′E
- Country: Netherlands
- Province: Limburg

Government
  - Body: Municipal council
  - Mayor: B.M.T.J. (Birgit) Op de Laak (PvdA)

Area
  - Total: 101.78 km^{2} (39.30 sq mi)
  - Land: 99.98 km^{2} (38.60 sq mi)
  - Water: 1.80 km^{2} (0.69 sq mi)
- Elevation: 33 m (108 ft)

Population (January 2021)
  - Total: 17,171
  - Density: 172/km^{2} (450/sq mi)
- Demonym: Nederweerter
- Time zone: UTC+1 (CET)
  - Summer (DST): UTC+2 (CEST)
- Postcode: 6030–6035, 6090–6092
- Area code: 0495
- Website: www.nederweert.nl

Nederweert (Dutch: [ˈneːdərˌʋeːrt]; Limburgish: Ni-jwieërt [ˈnɪjˌwiəʀt]) is a municipality and a town in southeastern Netherlands with a population of 17,171 as of 2021 and has an area of 101.78 km^{2} (39.30 sq mi) of which 1.80 km^{2} (0.69 sq mi) is water.

Nederweert lies at the intersection of three channels: the Zuid-Willemsvaart, the Noordervaart and the Wessem-Nederweert Canal. In the 19th century these channels provided transport routes to export peat that was harvested from the Peel. These channels connect Nederweert to Maastricht and 's-Hertogenbosch.

== History ==
Nederweert was originally called 'Merefelt' which means 'amongst the lakes', though it was later named Weert van den nedersten eynde. A 'Weert' in old Dutch means a high place in the landscape. This latter name later changed into Nederweert as it is called today.

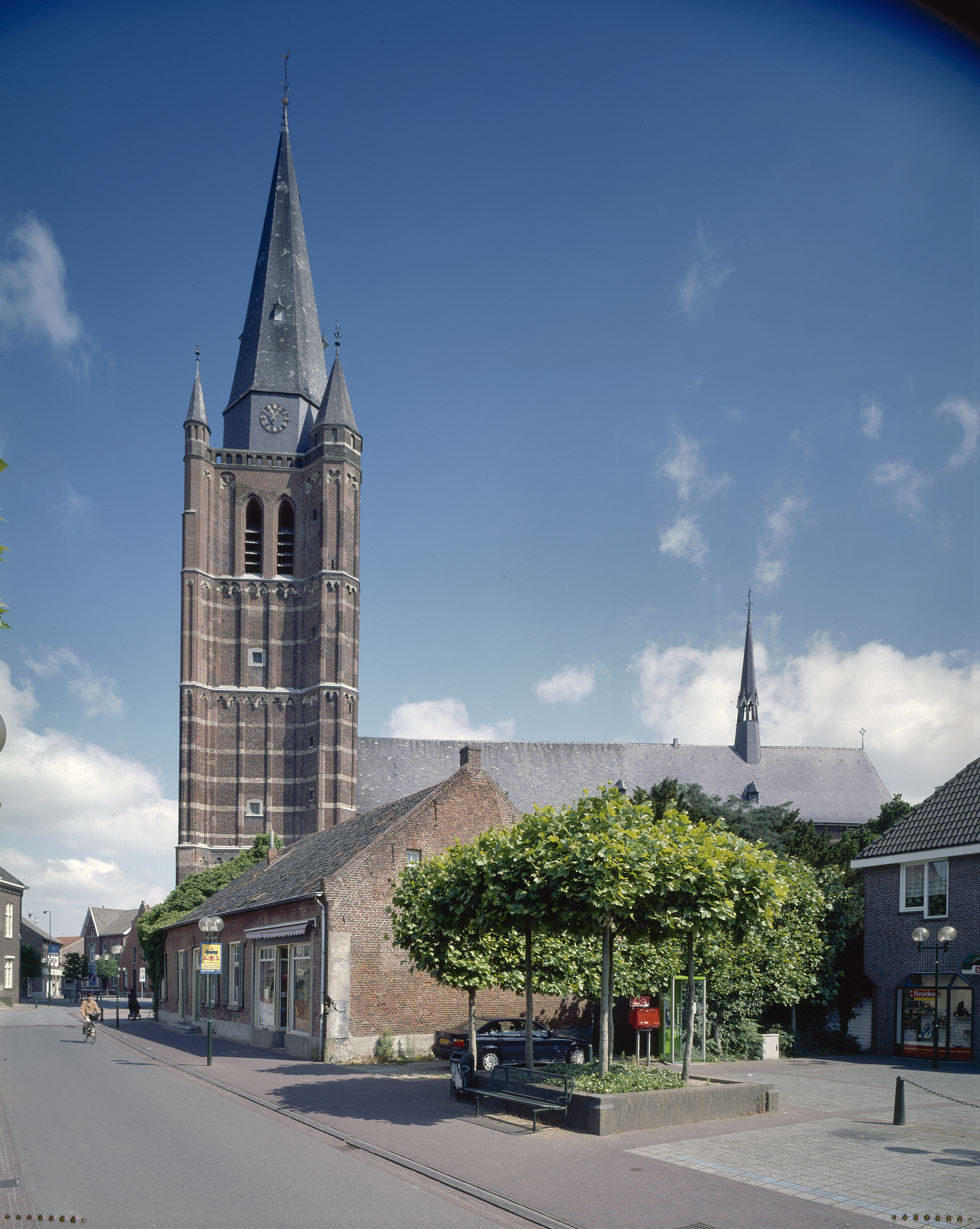
Sint Lambertuskerk

Before the 14th century Nederweert was part of the municipality of Weert. The first reference which speaks of Nederweert as independent was in 1419.

Nederweert has been under rule of the Graven van Horn (the dukes of Horn) until 1701. Later in 1715 it became part of the southern states of the Netherlands.

In 1785 it was annexed by the French. During this era it was part of the Belgian departement of the Nedermaas.

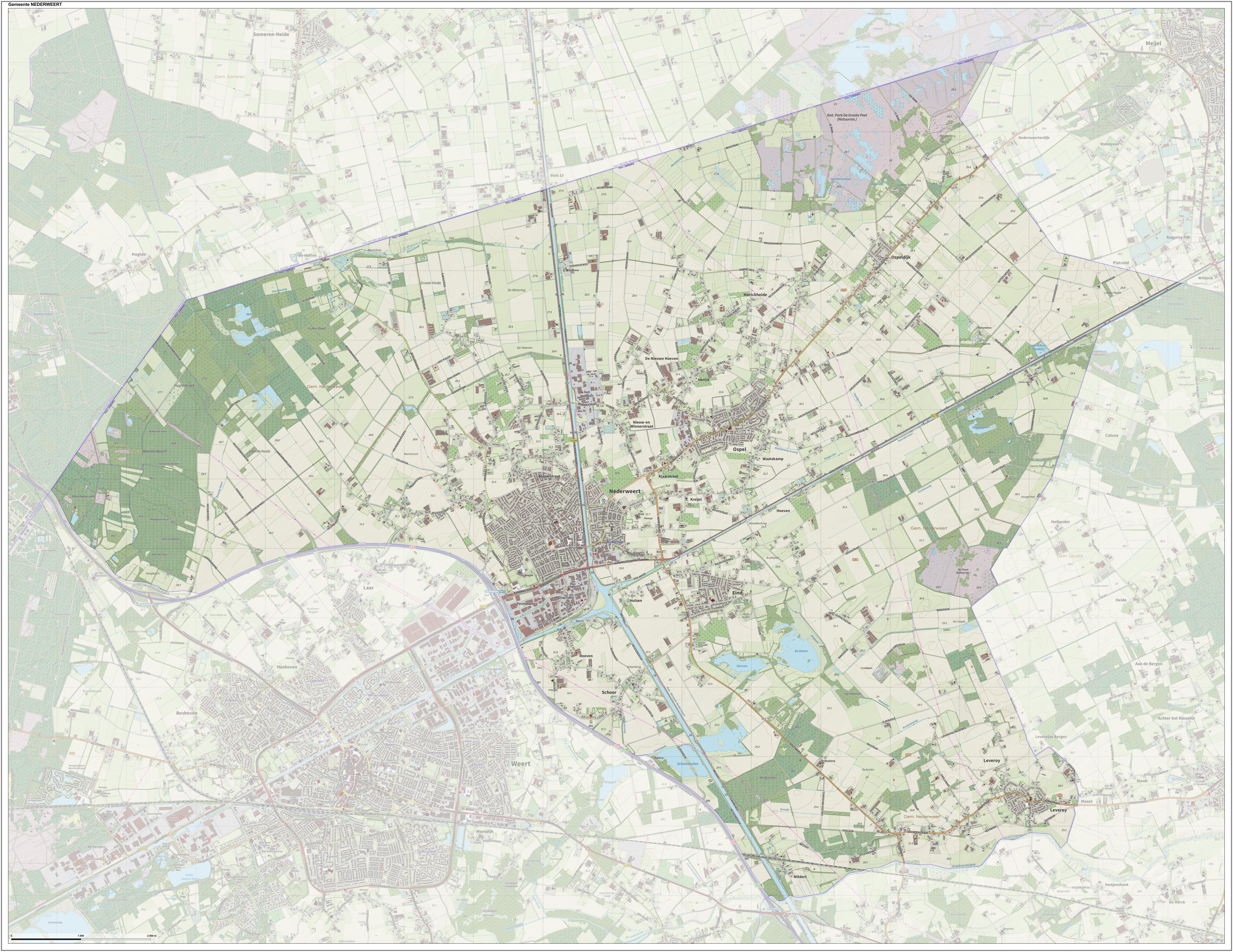
Dutch Topographic map of the municipality of Nederweert, June 2015

== Monuments ==
The most prominent monument of Nederweert is the Sint-Lambertus Kerk. It is a Brabantine Gothic-style church that was built in 1467.

== Population centres ==
- Budschop
- Leveroy
- Nederweert
- Nederweert-Eind
- Ospel
- Ospeldijk
- Schoor

== Notable people ==
- Margriet Tindemans (1951 in Nederweert – 2014) a musician, specializing in medieval music
- Marie Kessels (born 1954 in Nederweert) a Dutch poet and prose writer

== Gallery ==
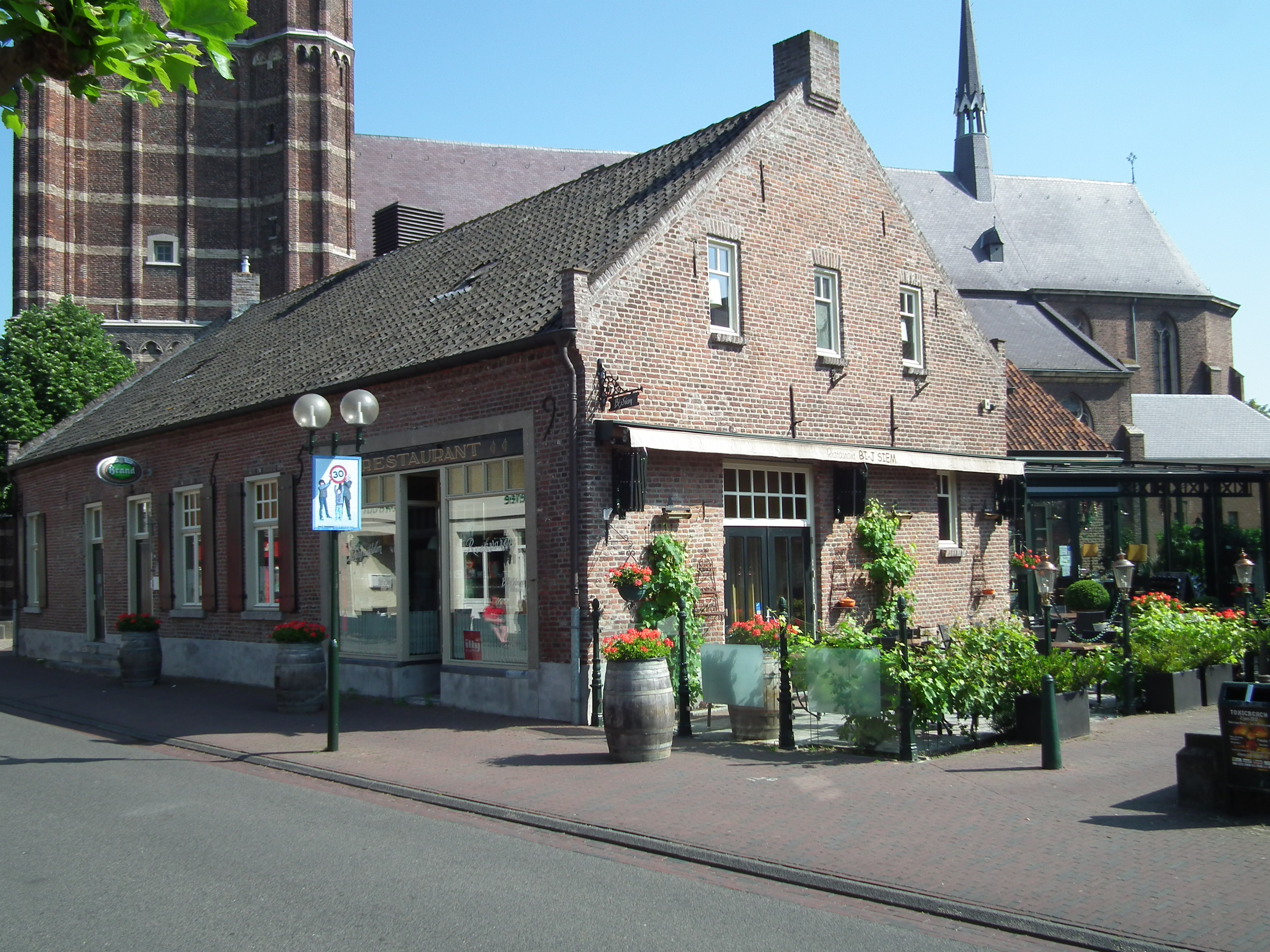
Restaurant Bi-J Siem, built in 1659

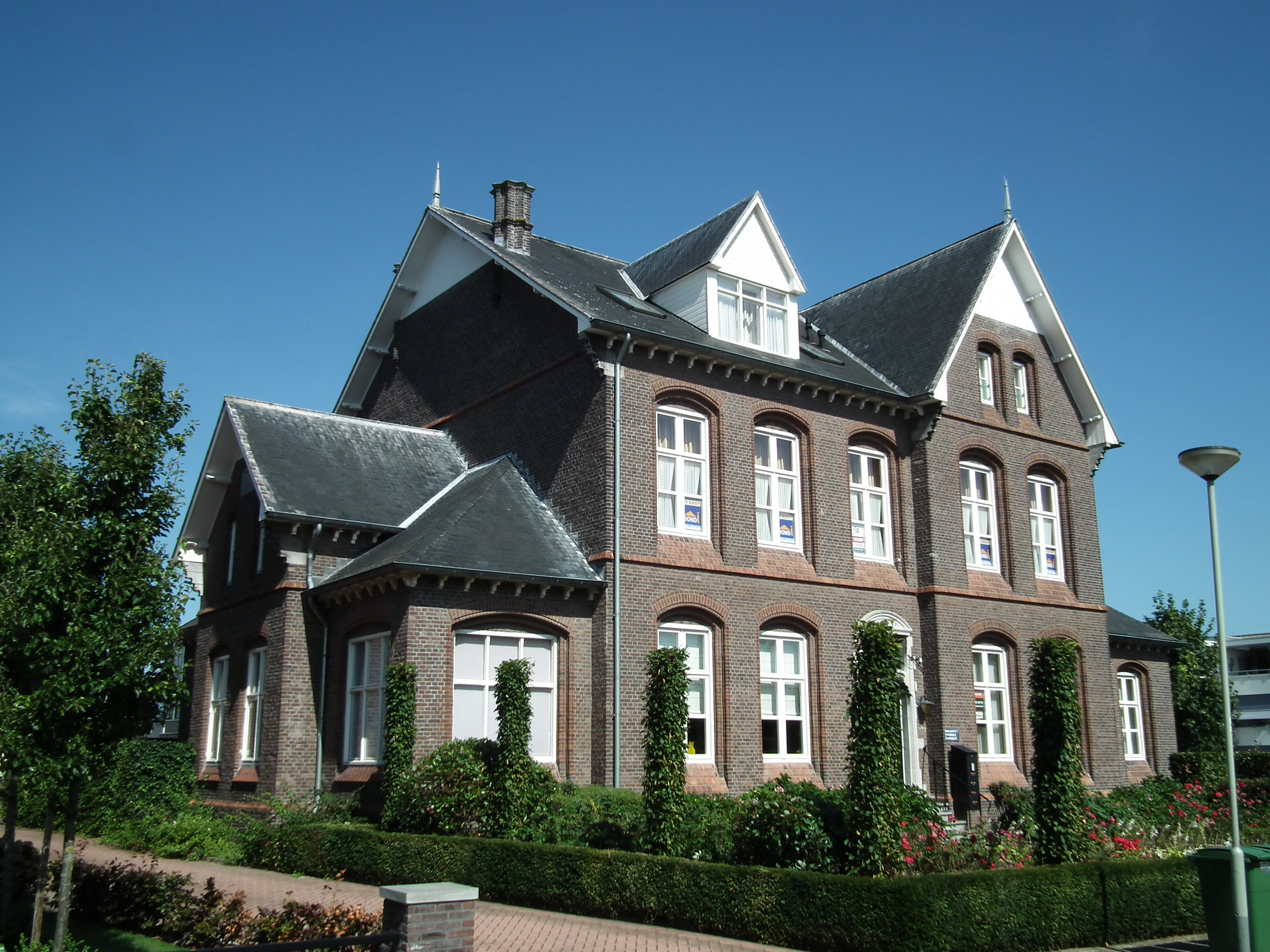
Front of the former rectory in Nederweert

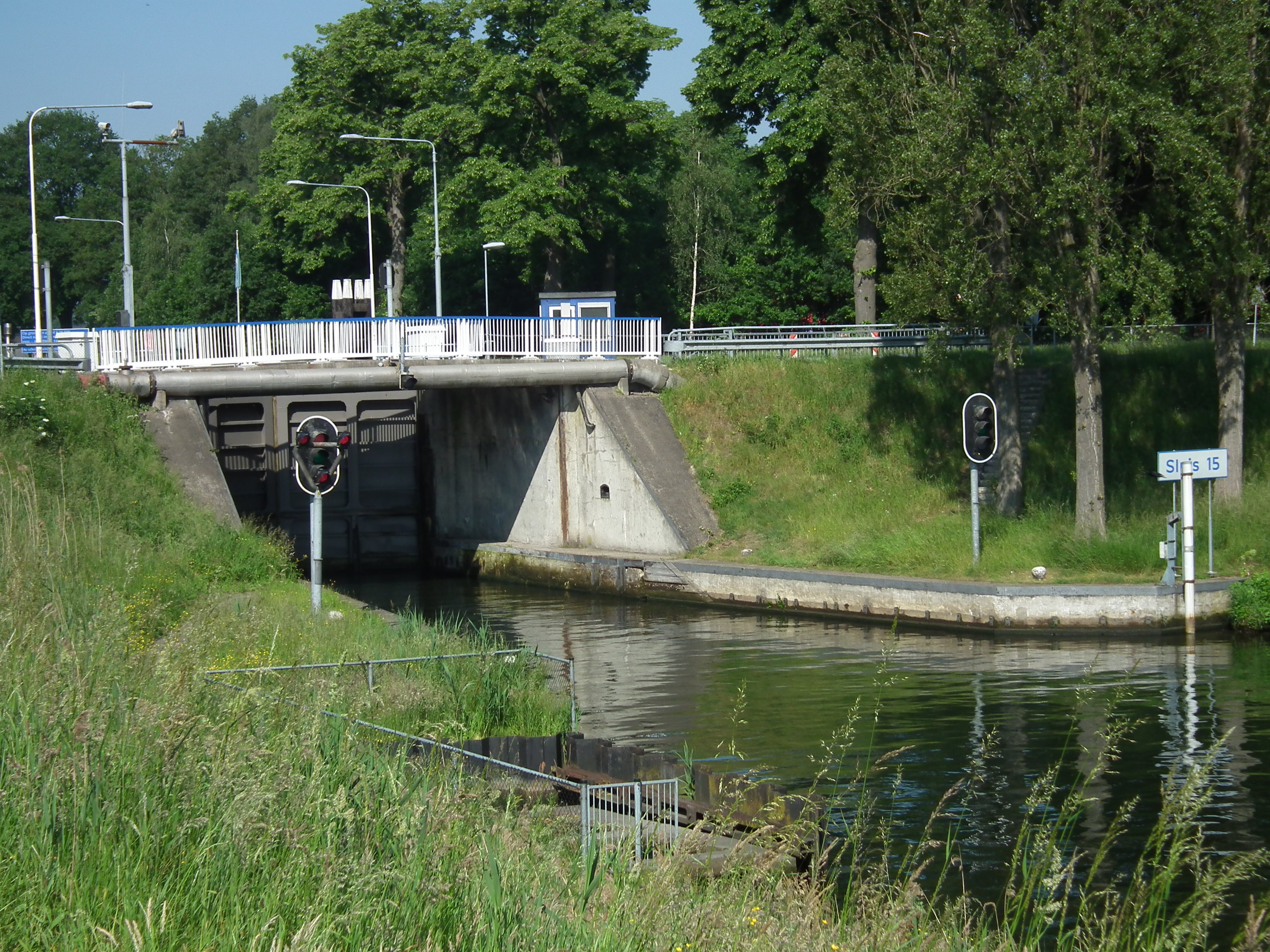
Sluis 15 in de Zuid-Willemsvaart

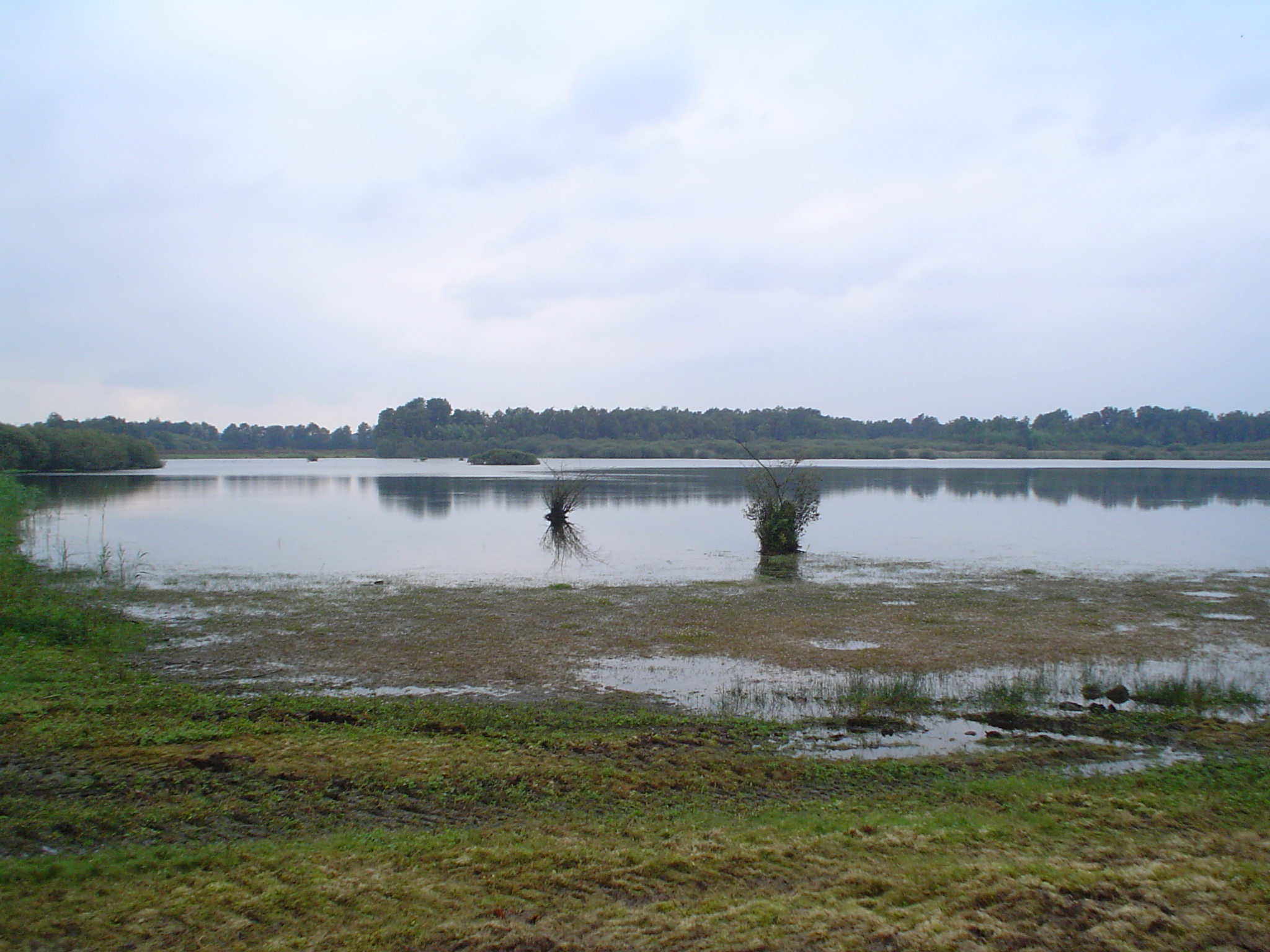
"De Banen", a lake in the nature area "Sarsven en De Banen", near Nederweert
