= Grietje =

Grietje is a Dutch feminine given name. It is a short form and diminutive of Margaretha. It was a common name, but its use has declined steadily since about 1900. The fairy tale Hansel and Gretel is called Hans en Grietje in Dutch. People with the name include:

- Grietje "Gré" de Jongh (1924–2002), Dutch sprinter
- Grietje Terburg Rowley (1927–2015), American Latter-day Saint hymn writer
- Grietje "Gretha" Smit (born 1976), Dutch speed skater
- Grietje Staffelt (born 1975), German politician
- Griet Van Vaerenbergh (born 1982), Belgian volleyball player
- Grietje Vanderheijden (born 1978), Belgian actress
- Grietje Zelle (1876–1917), Dutch exotic dancer and courtesan better known as Mata Hari

== See also ==
- 2049 Grietje, an asteroid in the asteroid belt named after Grietje Haring-Gehrels
