= Greet Grottendieck =

Dutch sculptor

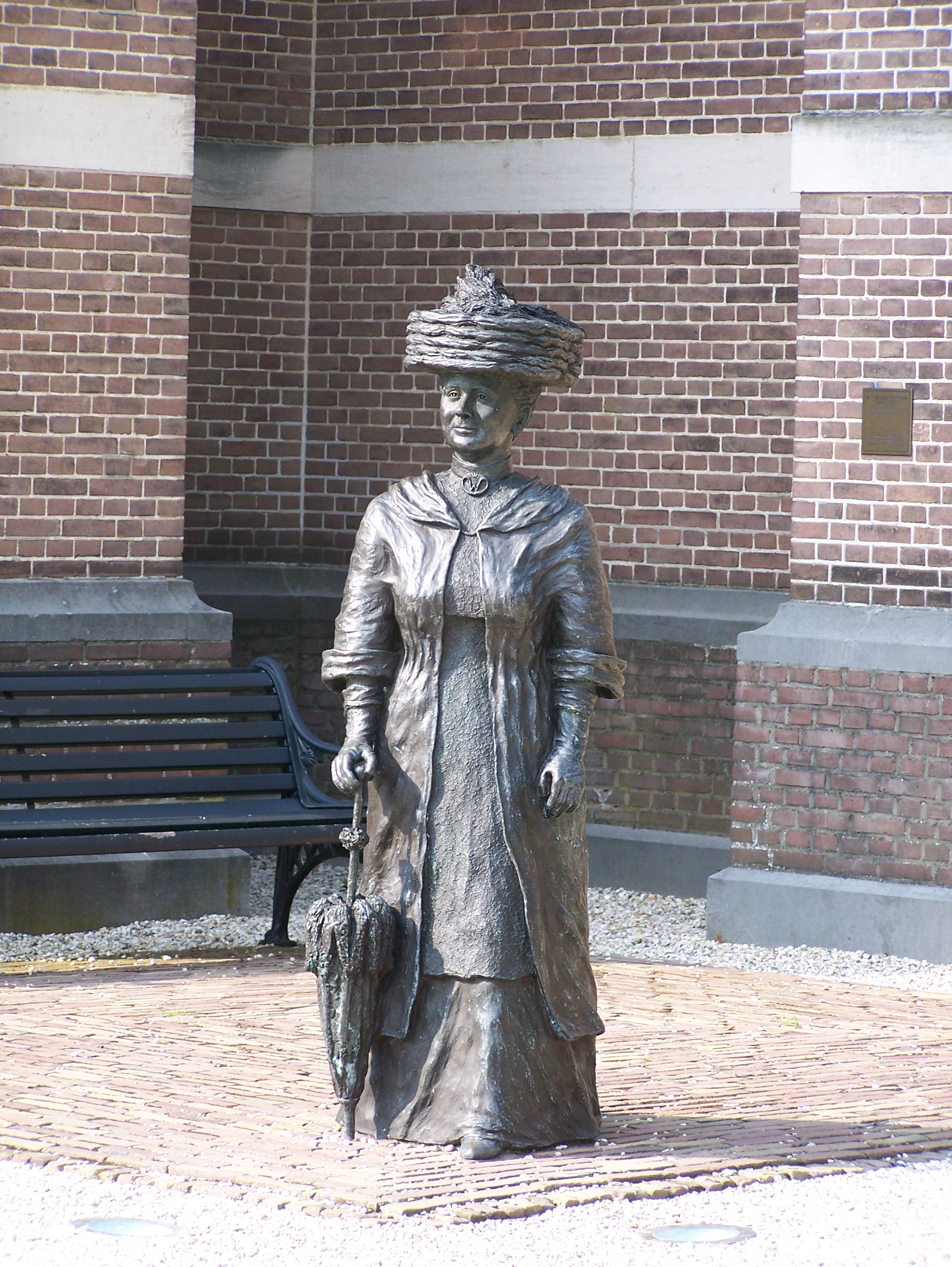
Statue of Queen Wilhelmina at Grote Kerk the Kerklaan/Loolaan in Apeldoorn. Made by Greet Grottendieck in 1998.

Greet Grottendieck (born 22 February 1943 in The Hague) is a Dutch sculptor.

Greet moved to the Veluwe in 1965. She makes sculptures of people and animals.

Her work can be seen in various cities and villages in the Netherlands.
