= Ospel =

- Village
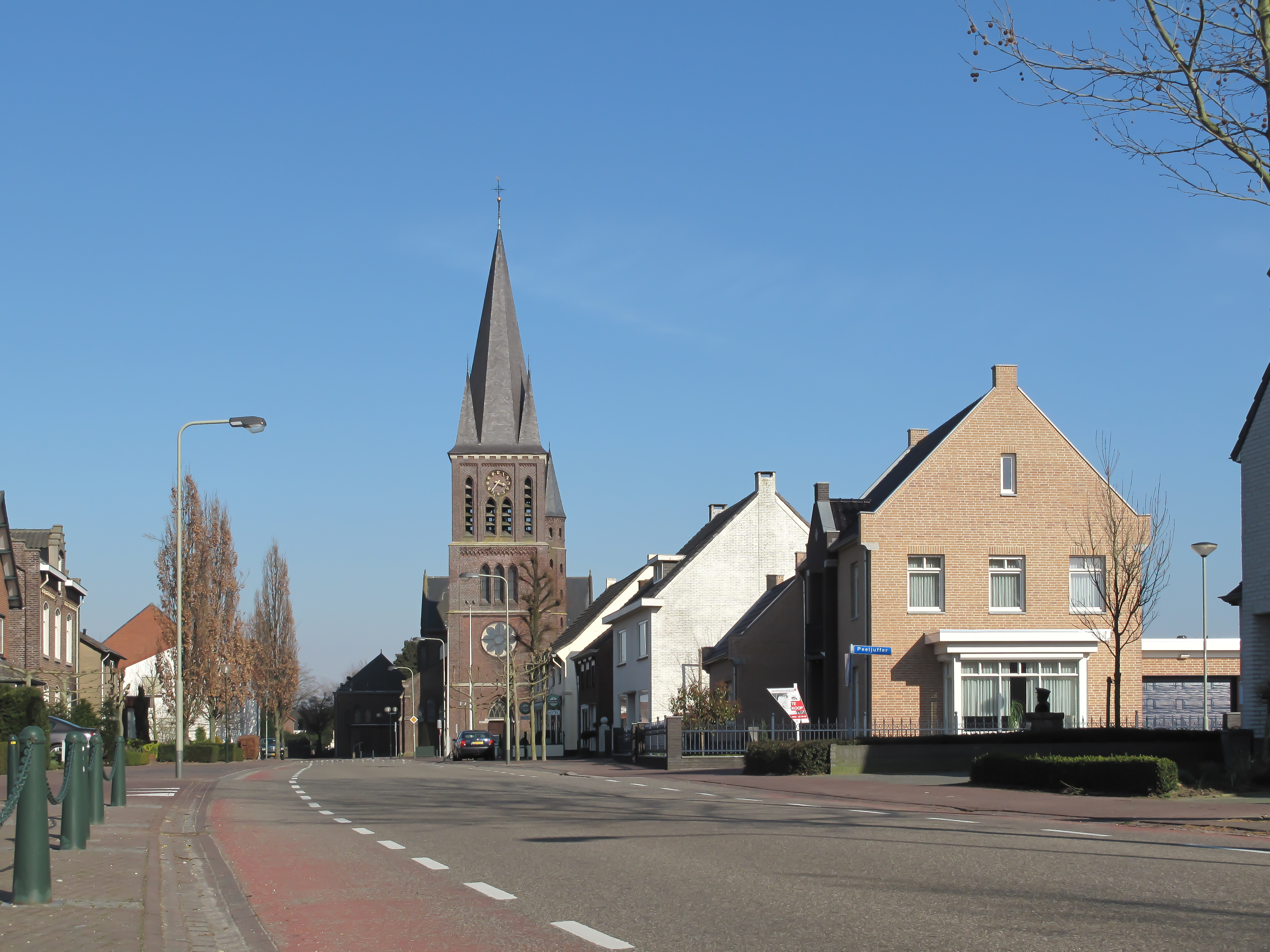
- Ospel, church in the street

- Location in the Netherlands Location in the province of Limburg in the Netherlands
- Coordinates: 51°17′52″N 5°47′8″E
- Country: Netherlands
- Province: Limburg
- Municipality: Nederweert

Area
  - Total: 1.59 km^{2} (0.61 sq mi)
- Elevation: 32 m (105 ft)

Population (2021)
  - Total: 2,600
  - Density: 1,600/km^{2} (4,200/sq mi)
- Time zone: UTC+1 (CET)
  - Summer (DST): UTC+2 (CEST)
- Postal code: 6035
- Dialing code: 0495
- Website: www.nederweert.nl

Ospel is a village in the Netherlands. It is located in Limburg near Weert, lying between Nederweert and Meijel, close to National Park De Groote Peel. Ospel has been settled since 1864 as a centre for bog harvesting. Once a year in the first weekend of May it is the centre for blues fans; the Moulin Blues Festival attracts thousands of blues fans from all over Europe. At the end of June is Ospel's kermis - a great time to visit with a lot of live music and a great atmosphere.

== Schooling ==
Ospel has a primary school. Ospel does not have a high school. Teenagers are required to attend schools in nearby cities, such as Weert, 8.50 kilometres (5.28 mi) from Ospel.

== Nearby cities ==
- Eindhoven is the closest city with more than 100,000 citizens (207,005, Google Earth, January 2008) at 26.3 kilometres (16.3 mi).
- Roermond is the closest city with more than 50,000 citizens (82,402, Google Earth, January 2008) at 22.8 kilometres (14.2 mi).
- Weert is the closest city with more than 30,000 citizens (47,699, Google Earth, January 2008) at 7.2 kilometres (4.5 mi).

== Gallery ==
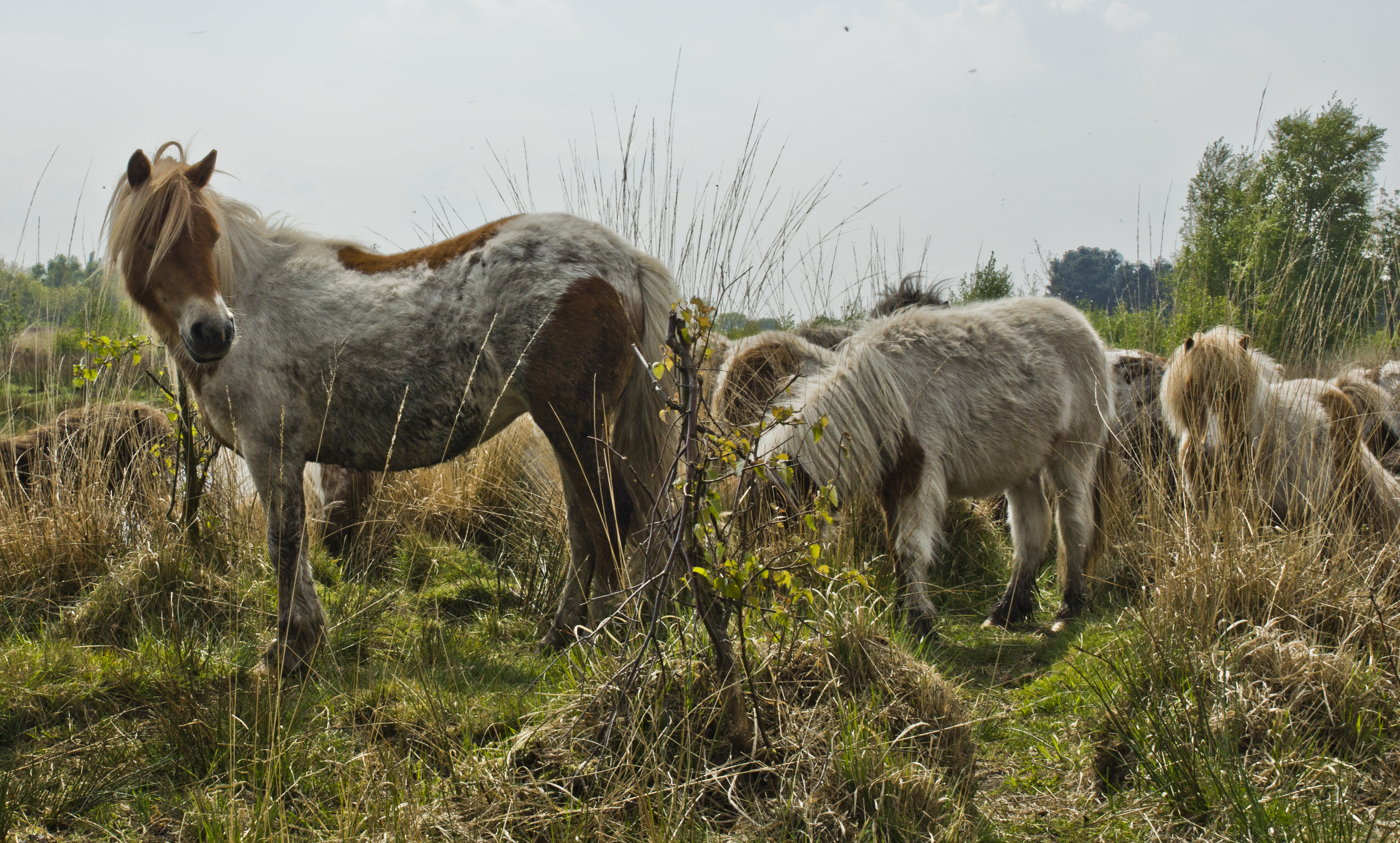
Shetland ponies in the Peel

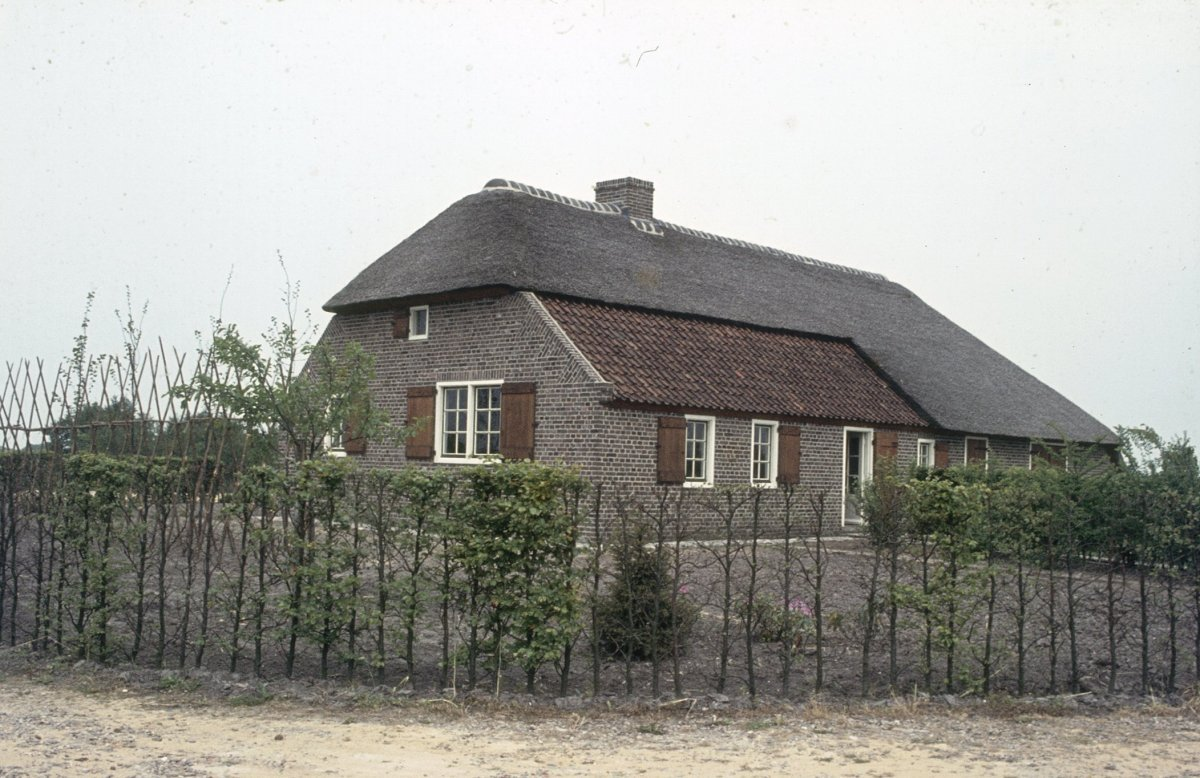
Farm in Ospel

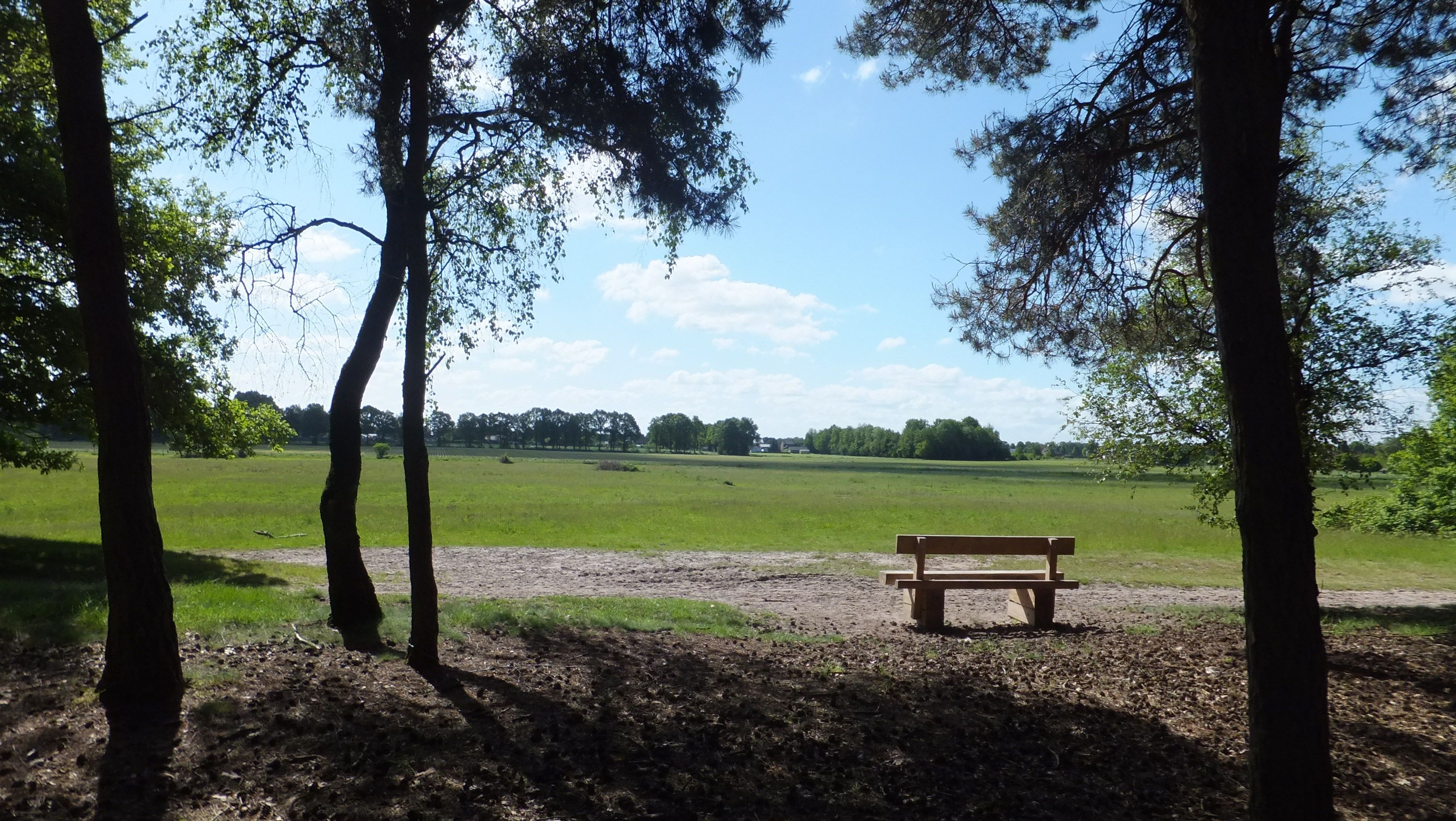
A bench called Linda
