= Margaux (disambiguation) =

Margaux is a former commune in south-western France.

Margaux may also refer to:

- Margaux (name)
- Château Margaux, a Bordeaux wine estate in Margaux, France
- Margaux AOC, a French wine-producing region encompassing the villages of Margaux, Arsac, Labarde, Soussans and Cantenac
- Margaux (film), a 2022 American horror film directed by Steven C. Miller

== See also ==
- Margaux-Cantenac, a commune in Gironde, France
