= Riki Sorsa =

Finnish pop singer

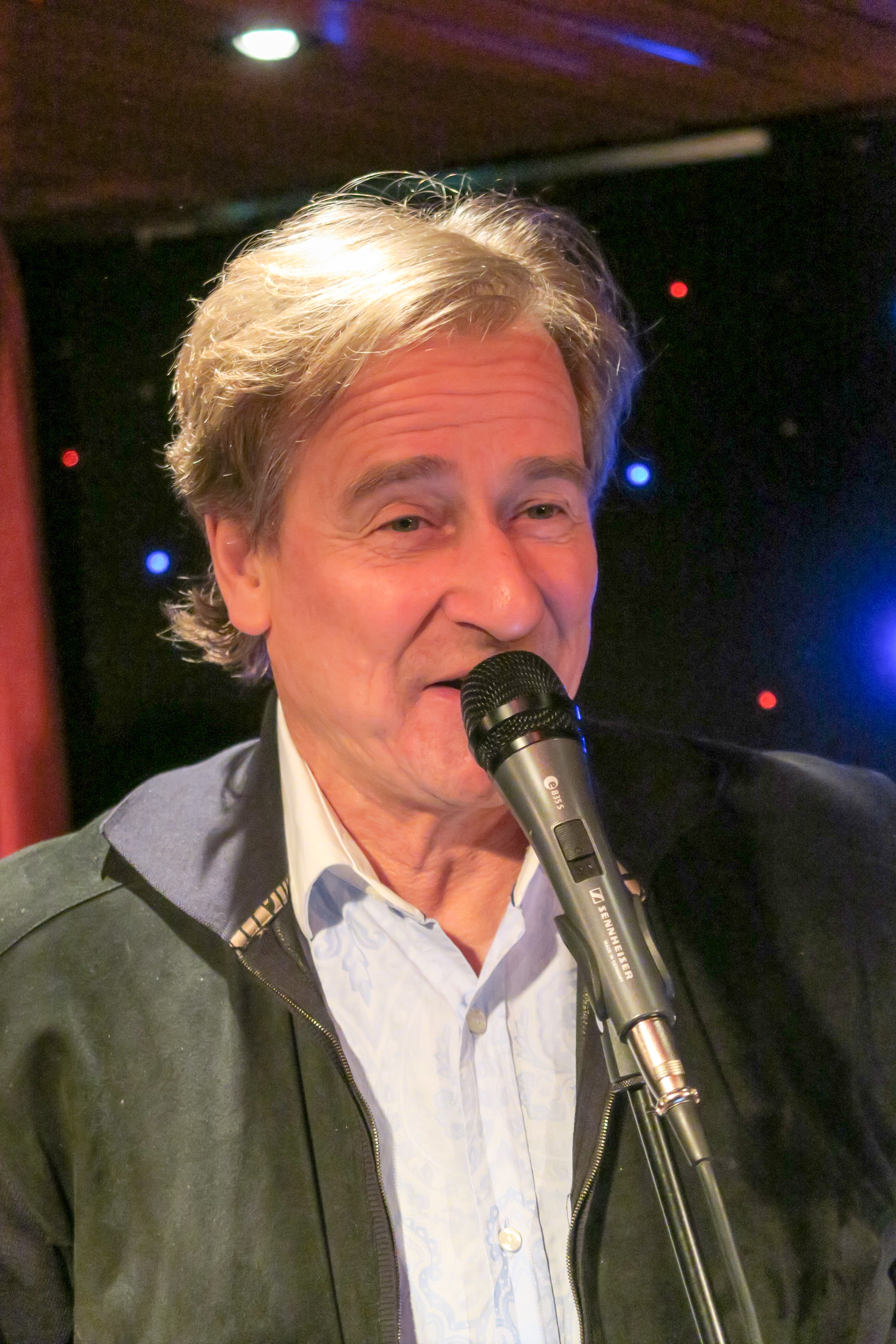
Riki Sorsa

Esko Richard "Riki" Sorsa (26 December 1952 – 10 May 2016) was a Finnish pop singer. He started his career in 1974 as the lead singer in the band The Zoo. He represented Finland in the Eurovision Song Contest 1981 with the entry "Reggae OK", a reggae influenced song in Finnish which came 16th (out of 20 countries). The song was composed by Jim Pembroke, the lyrics were written by Olli Ojala, and it was conducted by Otto Donner. Sorsa released several albums, singing in Finnish, Swedish, and English. Sorsa died of cancer on 10 May 2016.

== Personal life ==
Sorsa's parents were Esko Sorsa, a goldsmith and entrepreneur, and Margaretha von Bahr, a ballerina. His maternal grandfather was a Swedish-speaking Finn and maternal grandmother Russian. Sorsa's brother Robert von Bahr is a Swedish music producer.

== Discography ==
=== Albums ===
- The Zoo Hits Back (The Zoo, 1974)
- Changing Tunes (1981)
- Desert of Love (1982)
- Riki Sorsa (1983)
- This Is the Night (1983)
- Kellot ja peilit (1984, CD 1985)
- Myrskyn silmä (1986)
- Roomanpunaista (1989)
- Silmiisi sun (1992)
- Riki Sorsa & Leirinuotio-orkesteri (1993)
- Pieniä asioita (1994)
- Suolaista ja makeaa (1996)
- Valoa (2000)
- Kun tunnet rakkauden – Suomalainen laulukirja (2013)

=== Compilations ===
- Tähän asti – So Far 1980–1985 (1985)
- CBS-klassikot (1989)
- Parhaat (1998)
- Haltuus annan lauluni – 18 balladia (2007)

Preceded by Vesa-Matti Loiri with Huilumies	Finland in the Eurovision Song Contest; 1981	Succeeded by Kojo with Nuku pommiin
