= Margriet Tindemans =

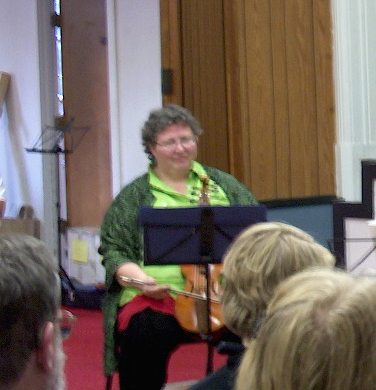

Background information
- Born: Margaretha E. Tindemans; March 26, 1951; Nederweert, the Netherlands
- Died: December 31, 2014 (aged 63) Seattle, Washington, USA
- Genres: Early Music, Baroque Music
- Instruments: Viola da Gamba, Vielle, Fiddle
- Labels: Harmonia Mundi, Erato, Wildboar, Musica Omnia, Landor
- Formerly of: Sequentia

Margriet E. Tindemans (March 26, 1951 – December 31, 2014) was a musician, specializing in medieval music.

The fourth child of Wilhelmina Coenen and Henricus Tindemans, Margriet demonstrated her musical talents early, and was named first violin in the National Youth Orchestra of the Netherlands. After Conservatory studies in Maastricht, then Brussels, Belgium, and Basel, Switzerland, she became an early member of Sequentia. She toured with that group for nine years until relocating to Seattle in 1986. There she founded the Medieval Women’s Choir, was an artist in residence at the University of Washington, served as director of the Port Townsend Early Music Workshop, and was a faculty member of the Cornish College of the Arts.

== Ensembles ==
- Sequentia
- Royal Dutch Opera
- Newberry Consort
- The King's Noyse (archive from 29 June 2009)
- The Folger Consort
- Seattle Baroque Orchestra
- Medieval Women’s Choir
- Pacific MusicWorks
