= Boekel =

- Municipality
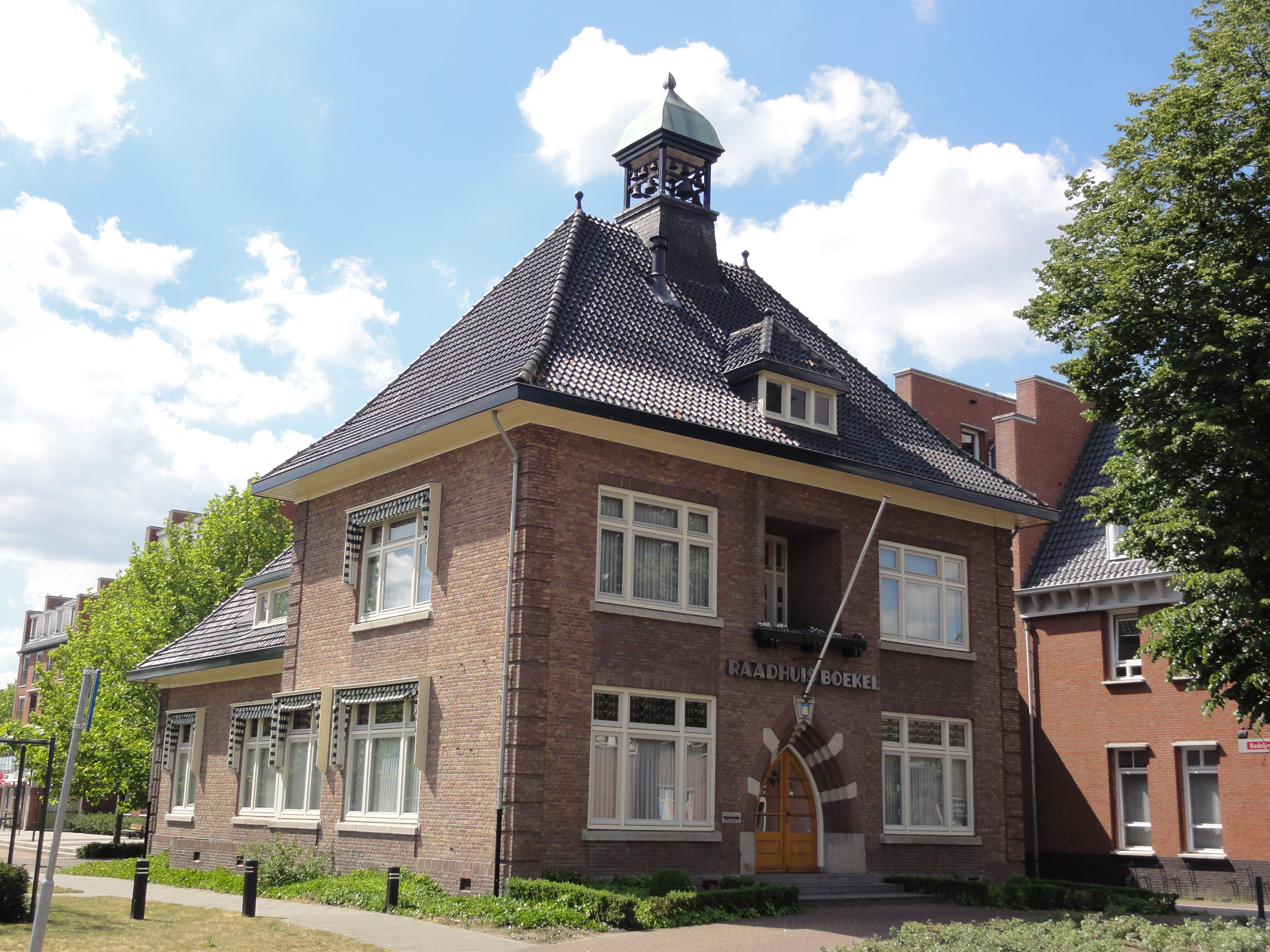
- Boekel town hall

- Flag Coat of arms

- Location in North Brabant
- Coordinates: 51°36′N 5°40′E
- Country: Netherlands
- Province: North Brabant

Government
  - Body: Municipal council
  - Mayor: Caroline van den Elsen (Independent)

Area
  - Total: 34.52 km^{2} (13.33 sq mi)
  - Land: 34.51 km^{2} (13.32 sq mi)
  - Water: 0.01 km^{2} (0.0039 sq mi)
- Elevation: 16 m (52 ft)

Population (January 2021)
  - Total: 10,959
  - Density: 318/km^{2} (820/sq mi)
  - Uden-Veghel: 175,119
- Time zone: UTC+1 (CET)
  - Summer (DST): UTC+2 (CEST)
- Postcode: 5427–5428
- Area code: 0492
- Website: www.boekel.nl

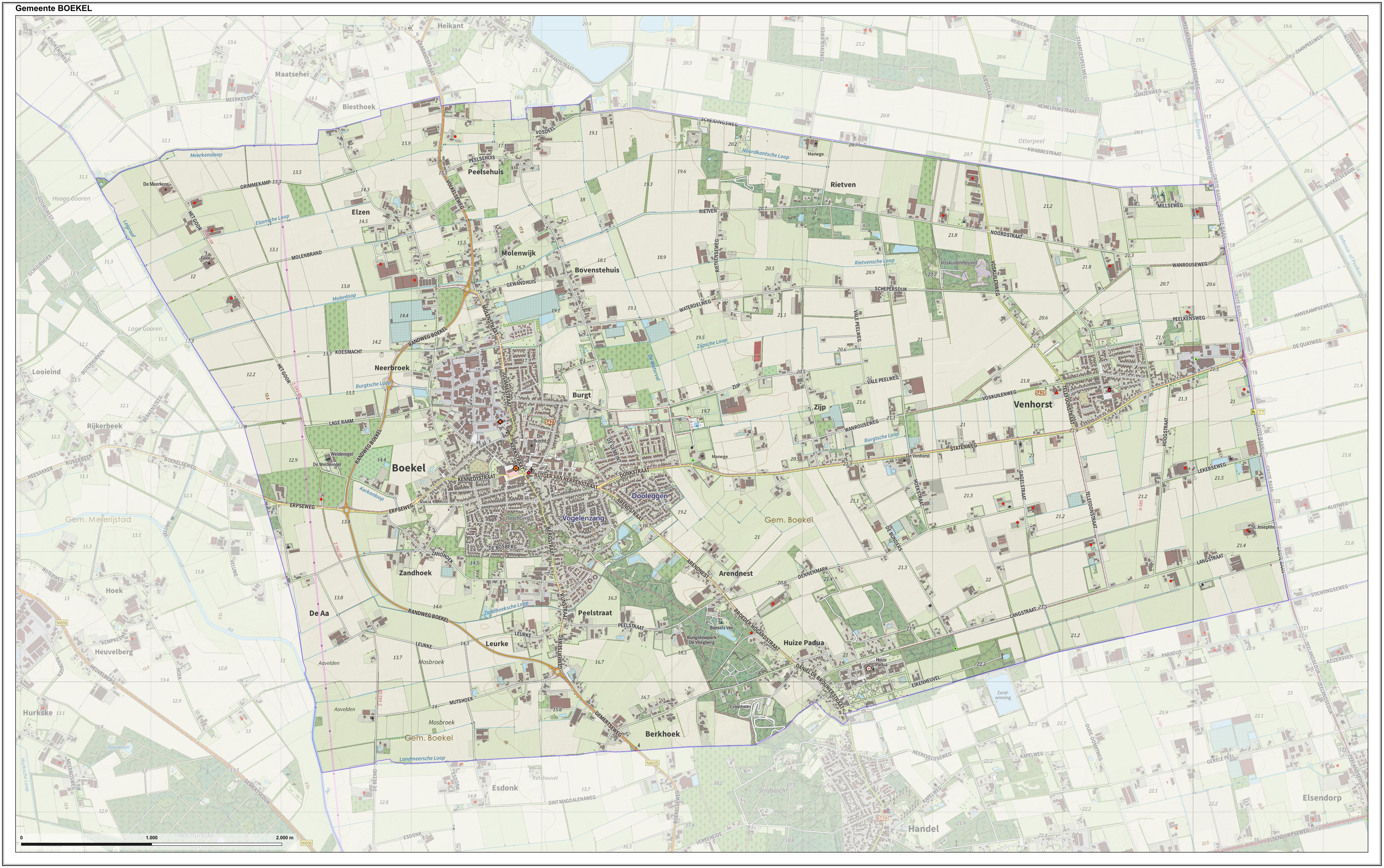
Dutch Topographic map of Boekel, June 2015

Boekel (Dutch pronunciation: [ˈbukəl]) is a municipality and a town in the southern Netherlands.

== Etymology ==
Previously it was assumed the name Boekel referred to the forest ("loo" in Dutch) of the lords Boc, similar to places like Boxmeer and Boxtel. The lords Boc were the first lords of Boxmeer, but have no connection to the other two places.

Currently, it is presumed that the name derives from Beukeloo, which is a type of beech forest.

== Population centres ==
- Boekel
- Huize Padua
- Venhorst

== History ==
=== Land van Herpen ===
Boekel was founded at some point in the Middle Ages as a settlement with a number of farms.

In the 13th century Boekel was part of de heerlijkheid Uden. In 1233 a separation took place between the Land van Cuijk and the Land van Herpen and Uden. At that time Uden, together with Herpen, formed a unit of government called a heerlijkheid. Until the foundation of the city of Ravenstein, Herpen was the main city of this region. Rutger van Herpen sold or leased in 1313 or 1314 the community rights (gemene gronden) to the residents of Boekel and Volkel. When the noble lord wanted to improve his cash position, he charged the use of any of its soil, beginning with the wasteland in his heerlijkheid. This common land was mainly marshy land and barren higher grounds, such as heaths.

=== Land of Ravenstein ===
In 1324 the heerlijkheid of Uden administratively belonged to the Land van Ravenstein, under the rule of the House of Valkenburg until 1396.

From the aldermen Herpen and Uden the Heikantsgericht was created in 1339. These stretched across the entire former heerlijkheid of Uden, consisting of Uden, Boekel and Zeeland. Of these aldermen, which in total had seven members, two were from Boekel.

After Reinoud of Valkenburg (married to Elisabeth of Cleves) died childlessly, the Land van Ravenstein passed to Adolph of Cleves in 1397, becoming part of Cleves. The area came under the rule of Palatinate-Neuburg in 1629. Under the Neuburgs' rule, the area had religious freedom.

Because the neighbouring provinces of Brabant and Gelderland from 1648 officially fell under the States-General, this Land van Ravenstein more and more was seen as "foreign". The religious freedom provided opportunities for Catholics in Brabant of the States. The Catholics of Erp built their own barn church on the border with Boekel. Due to the religious freedom several Catholic religious orders also settled in the Land of Ravenstein. In 1741 members of the Brothers Penitent, from the Handelse Kluis themselves wanted to settle in Boekel. Led by Daniël de Brouwer the brothers laid the foundation for the Psychiatric Hospital Huize Padua.

From the 17th century various conflicts arose among the villages of Boekel, Uden and Gemert around the demarcation lines between the Ravenstein, Cuijk and Gemert areas. In 1663 the boundary dispute with the Vrije Heerlijkheid Gemert was settled. In 1729, a similar problem with Uden was settled.

== See also ==
- Henk Heithuis

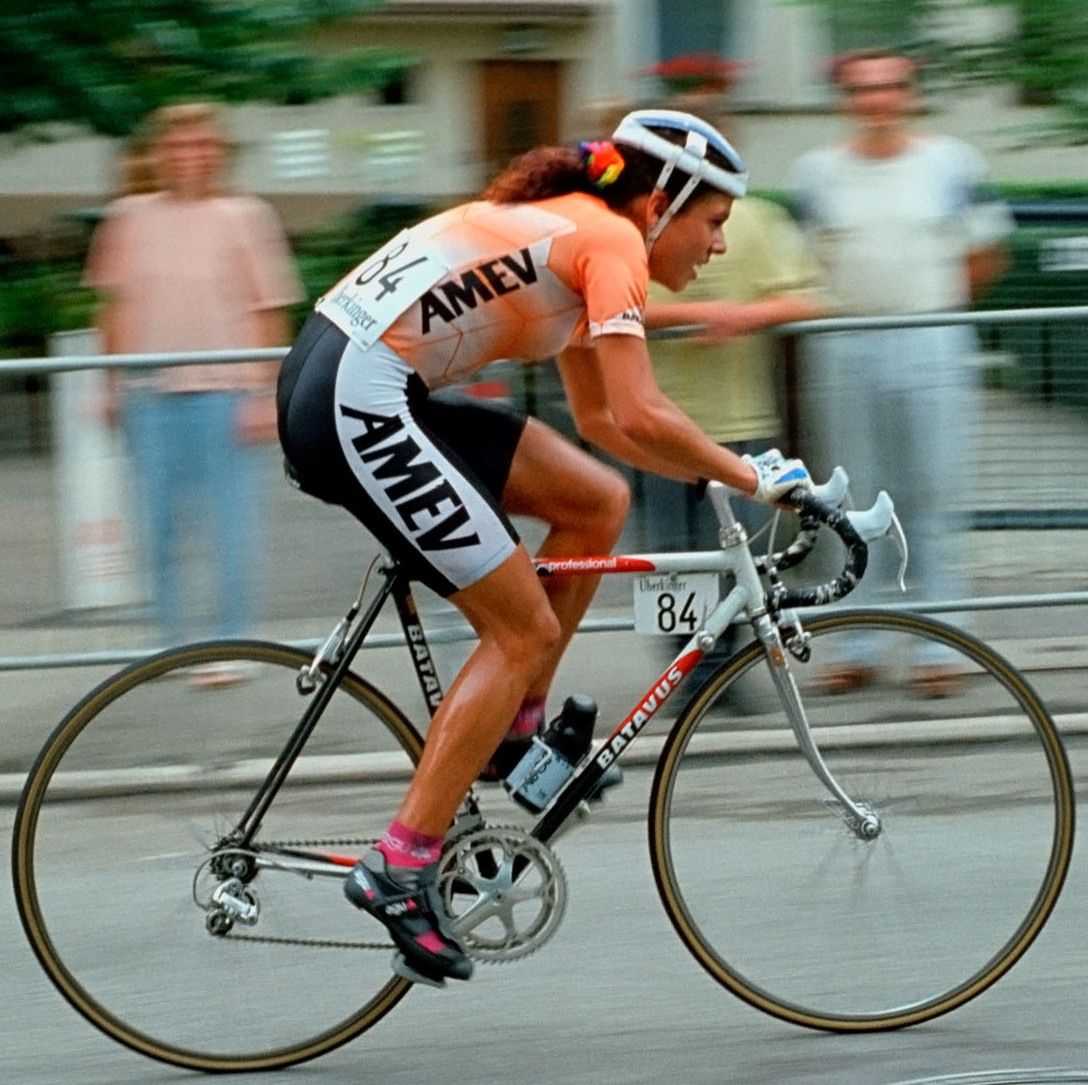
Leontien van Moorsel, 2014

== Notable people ==
- Hans Gruyters (1925 in Boekel – 1980) a Dutch criminal, bankrobber, burglar and escaped convict
- Leontien van Moorsel (born 1970 in Boekel) a Dutch retired racing cyclist, four time gold medallist at the 2000 & 2004 Olympic Games
- Mirella van Melis (born 1979 in Venhorst) a retired female track and road racing cyclist
- Hannes van Asseldonk (born 1992 in Boekel) is a Dutch racing driver

== Gallery ==
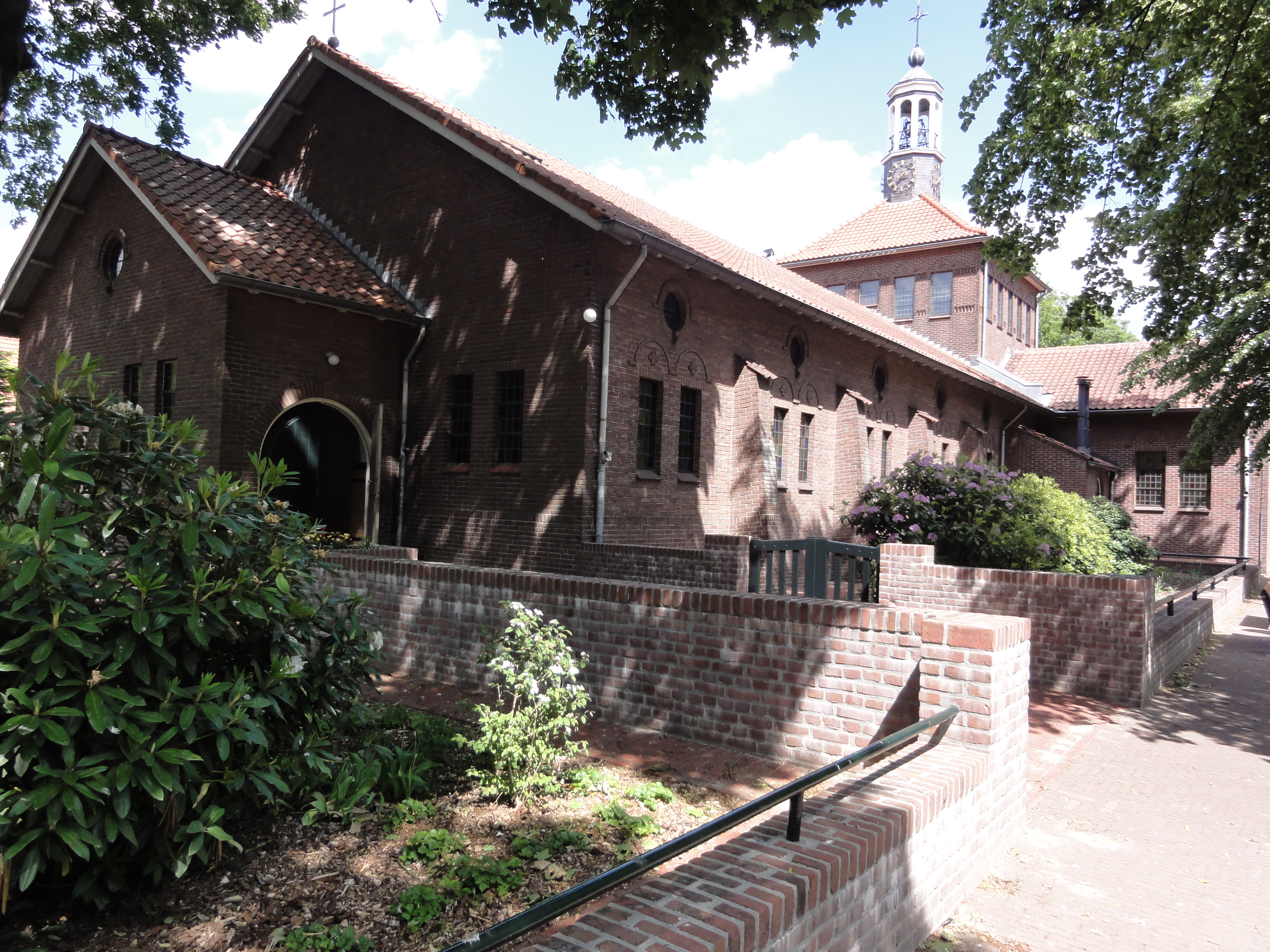
Sint-Josef church, Venhorst, Boekel

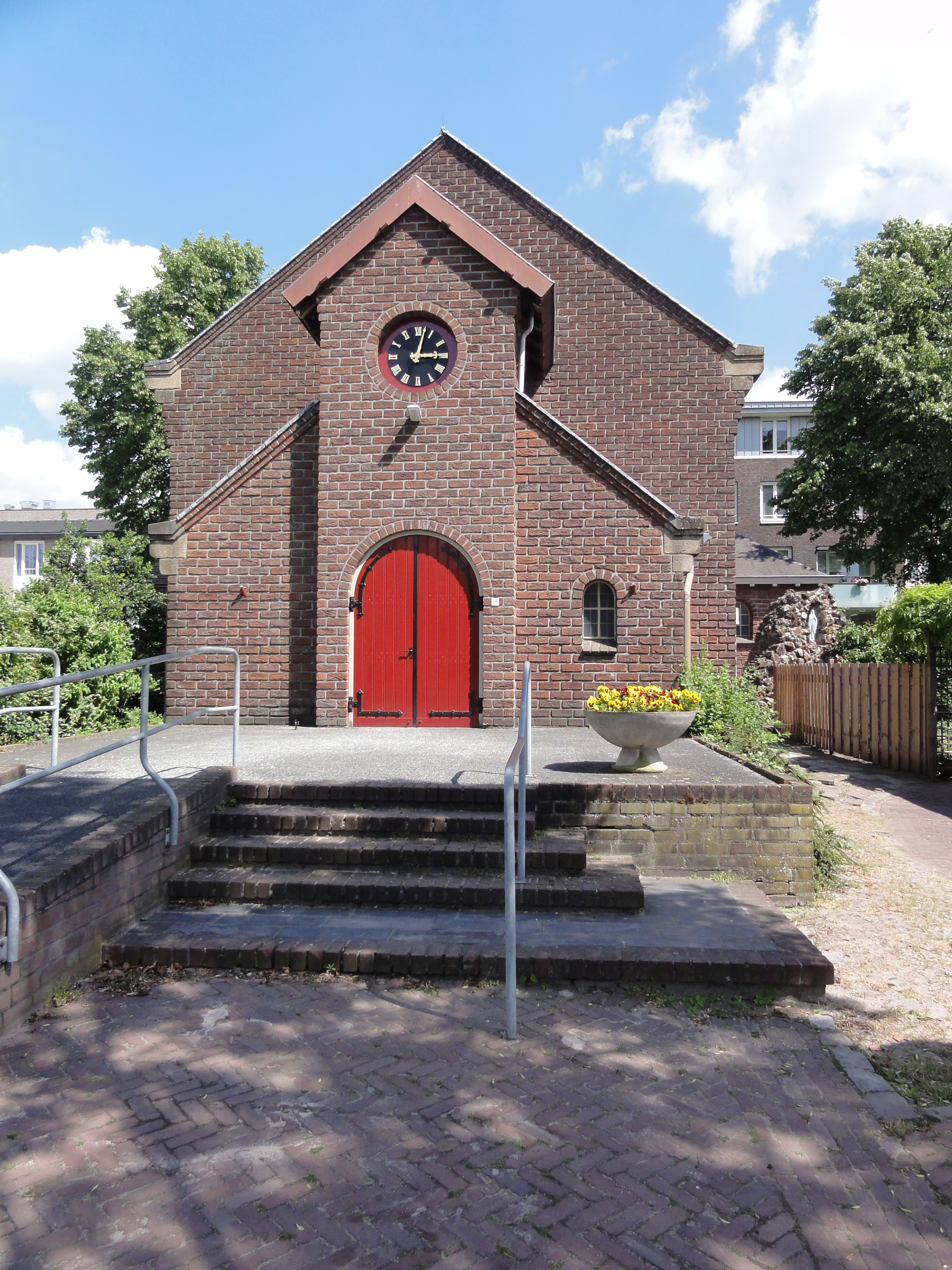
Bookel chapel, behind church

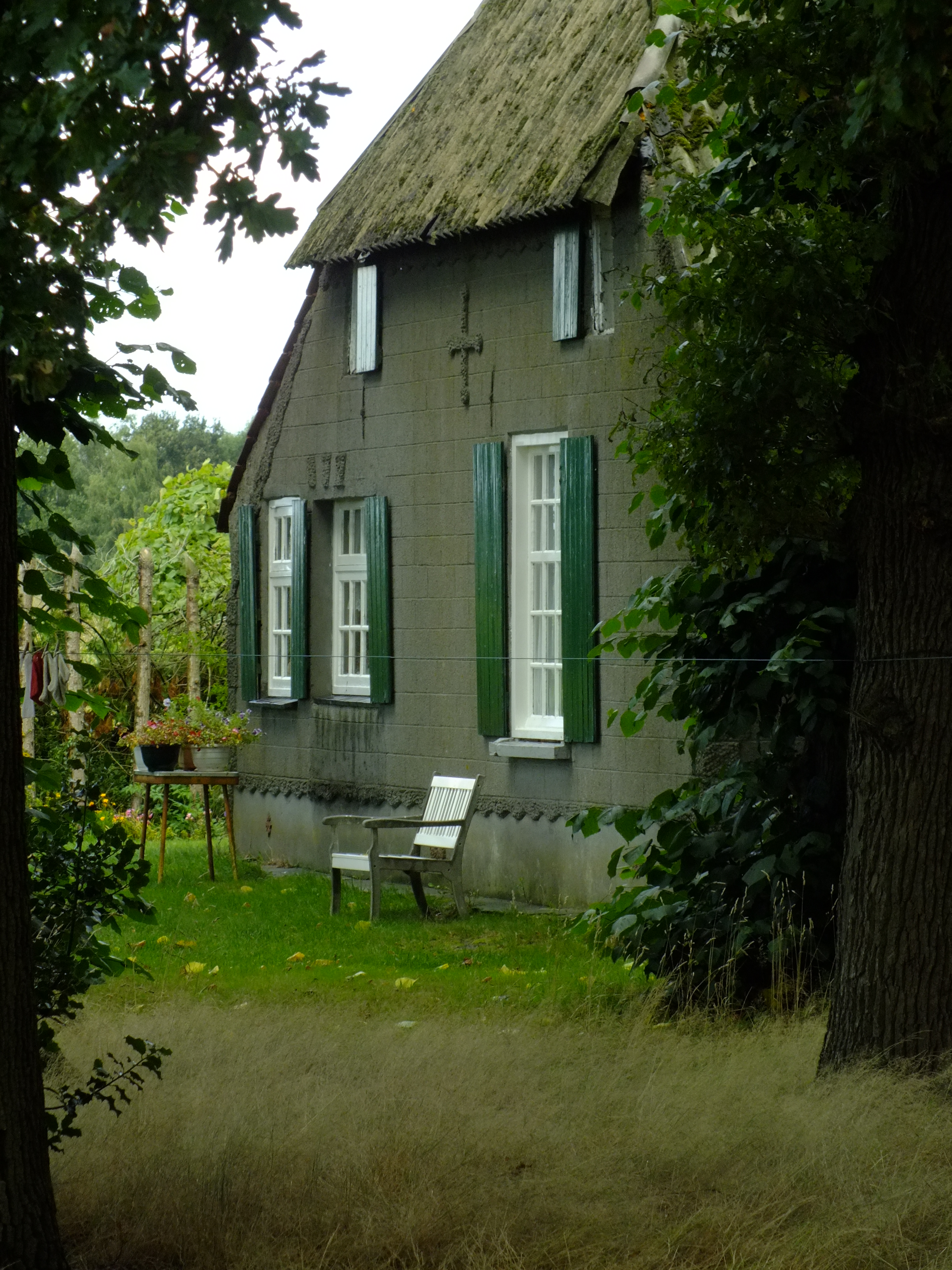
T.T farm Berkhoek, Boekel

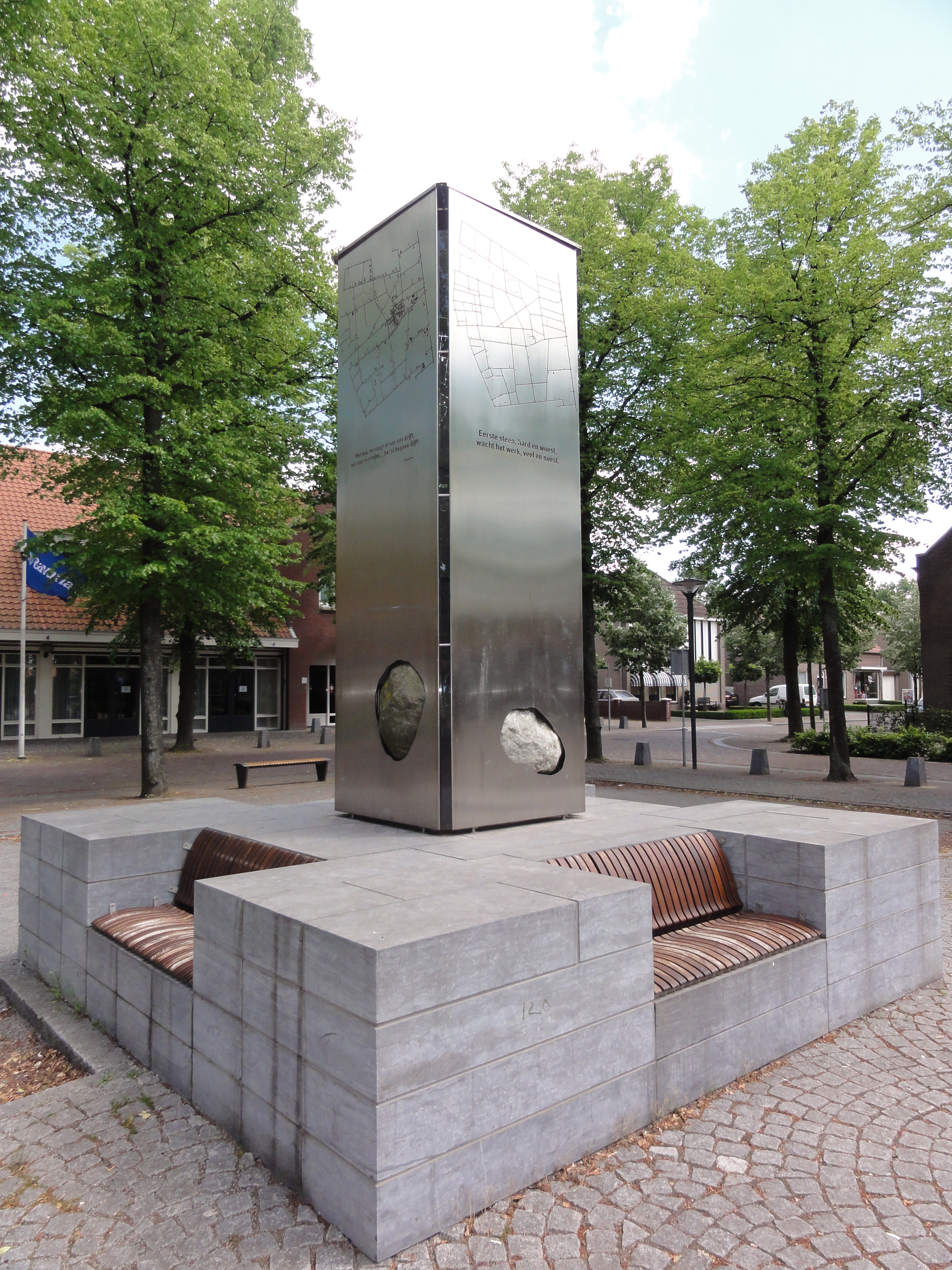
Venhorst, monument in kerkplein

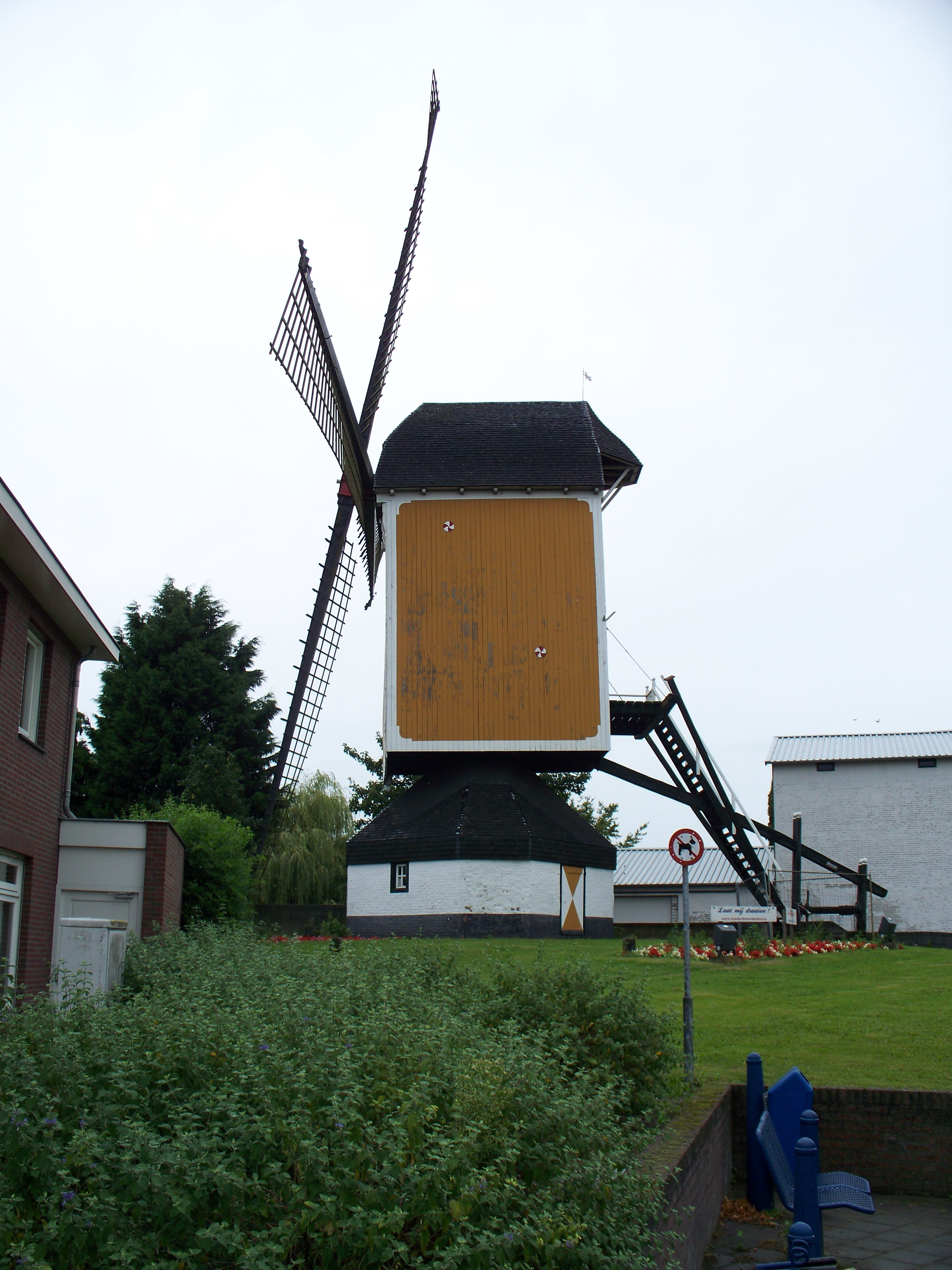
Boekel windmill
