= Henk Heithuis =

Dutch victim of sexual abuse by the Catholic Church (1935–1958)

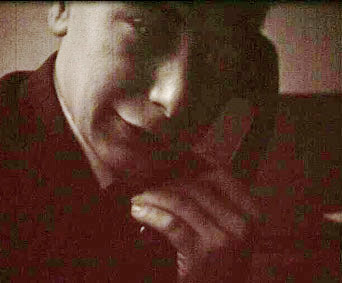
- Henk Heithuis on the phone
- Born: 1935; Almelo, Netherlands
- Died: 28 October 1958 (aged 22–23); Oud Ade, Netherlands
- Occupation: Sailor
- Known for: Victim of clerical sexual abuse

Henk Heithuis (1935 – 28 October 1958) was a Dutch student of a Catholic boarding school and victim of sexual abuse. He was castrated on the orders of the Catholic church in order to be cured of his homosexuality.

== Life ==
Henk Heithuis was born a child of divorce and was from the first year of his life educated at orphanages and boarding schools in the southern Netherlands. The boarding school "Saint Vincent" in Harreveld which was run by the Catholic church, was subsequently investigated for sexual abuse of minors by priests. Heithuis, like other children there, learned handcrafts in the years 1950–1953.

== Sexual abuse ==
On 30 January 1956, Heithuis filed a criminal complaint against the friars of the boarding school at Harreveld. He accused them of having abused him sexually in the years 1951–1953, when he was a student. Also, in 1955 after he had already finished his school days he went back to the boarding school during the weekends because his family didn't want to take care of him. Also during these weekends sexual acts between the monks and Henk took place.

== Castration ==
The criminal complaint resulted in Heithuis being accused of having seduced the monks. Thereupon he was committed to a Roman Catholic psychiatric hospital, Huize Padua in Boekel.

As part of his treatment he was castrated. The surgery took place at St. Joseph Hospital in Veghel. Heithuis was 20 years old and then a minor under applicable Dutch law.

== Life after castration and death ==
Heithuis worked as a sailor. He suffered severely from the psychological and hormonal effects of castration. In 1957 he reported to the Dutch consulate in Kobe, Japan, where he had left the vessel. With the help of IJsbrand Rogge, who was then working at a Dutch bank branch in Japan, Henk returned to the Netherlands. He planned a legal campaign against the people who were responsible for the crime committed against him.

Heithuis told IJsbrand Rogge and his brother Cornelius, then 24 and 27 years old, about his life as a foster child in Catholic orphanages, boarding schools and mental health institutions. The Rogge brothers saw his genital mutilation; according to them "all was gone". In 1957 Heithuis charged the friars again, this time because of the castration.

Heithuis died 28 October 1958 in a car accident. The police confiscated and destroyed all his personal possessions and his court documents on the day of his death. Heithuis often expressed his fear that "they will get hold of me again."
