= Willem Grasso =

Dutch businessman

Willem Grasso (20 April 1833 – 20 March 1903) was the founder of Grasso's Royal Machine Factories Ltd.

== Biography ==
Grasso was born at Tilburg, the son of a smith. He moved with his family in 1845 to 's-Hertogenbosch. In 1858, he started his own little forge at Hinthamereinde 289 in ’s-Hertogenbosch. In 1868, he built a new factory / living house. Thanks to his good contacts with Jurgens, who had received the rights for producing margarine in 1871. Willem Grasso was the first to have the chance to produce machines for this fast growing industry.

In 1894, his son Henri Grasso would take over the company. In 1896, he started a refrigeration department in Vught. In 1913, he returned to ’s-Hertogenbosch, when the opportunity came up to build a brand new factory there. In the same year, he was the first in the Netherlands to start producing refrigeration machines, using the name Grasso. He died in Boekel.
