= Hans Gruyters =

Dutch criminal

- Born: 28 April 1925; Boekel, Netherlands
- Died: 24 October 1980 (aged 55)
- Other name: The Black Rider
- Criminal charges: Murder, bank robbery, burglary
- Penalty: 15 years

Details
- Killed: 2

Hans Gruyters (28 April 1925, Boekel – 24 October 1980) was a Dutch criminal. In the 1950s, he was a car salesman in the Dutch province of North Brabant. His nickname was The Black Rider, because he once appeared completely dressed in black at a party.

On 15 November 1954, he fatally shot Jan van Dieten, a post office executive in Ravenstein. Gruyters was 29 at the time, and had already been convicted six times for lesser offences. On 16 November, he robbed a bank, and on 31 December he broke into a vicar's house in Volkel (a small village in North Brabant), after which he ran over a man on a bike, killing the man in the process. By then, the police were on his trail, but this did not prevent him from trying to rob a bank in Oss some days later. He was eventually arrested on 5 January 1955 and sentenced to fifteen years in prison in 1956.

In 1957, he escaped from the prison in Scheveningen, which was widely covered in the press, but was soon found and returned to his cell. He was released in 1966.

After being released from prison he briefly embarked on a singing career without much success.

Gruyters married twice; his first wife divorced him when he was in prison. After marrying a second time, he seems to have been a reformed character, building up a cleaning business that at one point employed more than 30 people. The second marriage produced one daughter.

Gruyters died in 1980 after suffering a heart attack while riding his horse. He is buried in Rumpt.

== In popular culture ==
- Erik Vink (a Dutch journalist and playwright) wrote a play called De Zwarte Ruiter (The Black Rider) about Gruyters, which has been performed by a number of small theater groups. This play should not be confused with De Zwarte Ruiter (The Black Rider) - a film by Wim Verstappen.
- The Ottawa-based band, Wise, Young and King made Hans Gruyters the subject of their song, The Black Rider.
