= Dieden, Demen en Langel =

Coordinates: 51°49′N 5°37′E

Coat of arms of the former municipality

Dieden, Demen en Langel is a former municipality in the Dutch province of North Brabant. It is now part of the municipality of Oss. The municipality covered the three villages Dieden, Demen, and Neerlangel (then just called "Langel"), located on the left bank of the Maas.

Dieden, Demen en Langel was a separate municipality until 1923, when it was merged with Ravenstein.
