= Mirella van Melis =

Dutch racing cyclist

Personal information
- Full name: Mirella van Melis
- Born: 8 January 1979 (age 47) Venhorst, Netherlands

Cycling career
- Sport: Cycling
- Discipline: Road
- Role: Rider

Major wins
- World Junior Road Champion (1997)

Mirella van Melis (born 8 January 1979) is a retired female track and road racing cyclist from the Netherlands. She was born in Venhorst, North Brabant, and started her career as a cyclo-cross rider.

== Career ==
1996
2nd in Gieten, Cyclo-cross (NED)
2nd in Berlicum, Cyclo-cross (NED)
3rd in Amersfoort, Cyclo-cross (NED)
1997
1st in World Championship, Road, Juniors, San Sebastian (ESP)
1998
1st in Netherlands National Championship, Track, 500 m, Elite, The Netherlands (NED)
1st in Netherlands National Championship, Track, Sprint, Elite, The Netherlands (NED)
2nd in Stage 1 Ster van Zeeland (NED)
3rd in Stage 4 Ster van Zeeland (NED)
3rd in Haak Voorjaarsrace (NED)
3rd in Prologue Greenery International (NED)
1st in Stage 2 Greenery International (NED)
2nd in General Classification Greenery International (NED)
3rd in European Championship, Road, U23, Uppsala (SWE)
1999
1st in Netherlands European Championship, Track, Points race, U23
2nd in Netherlands National Championship, Track, 500 m, Elite, The Netherlands (NED)
1st in Netherlands National Championship, Track, Sprint, Elite, The Netherlands (NED)
2nd in Stage 4 Ster Zeeuwsche Eilanden (NED)
3rd in Stage 1 GP Boekel (NED)
2nd in Stage 2 GP Boekel (NED)
2000
3rd in Stage 5 Grande Boucle Féminine Internationale (FRA)
3rd in Stage 7 Grande Boucle Féminine Internationale (FRA)
2nd in Canberra Women's Classic, Canberra (AUS)
2nd in European Championship, Road, U23, Kielce (POL)
1st in Stage 1 Holland Ladies Tour, Bergeijk (NED)
2nd in Stage 5 part a Holland Ladies Tour, Dronten (NED)
2nd in Tour de Okinawa (JPN)
2001
3rd in Netherlands National Championship, Track, 500 m, Elite, The Netherlands (NED)
2nd in Netherlands National Championship, Track, Points race, Elite, The Netherlands (NED)
3rd in Netherlands National Championship, Track, Sprint, Elite, The Netherlands (NED)
2nd in Stage 5 Thüringen-Rundfahrt der Frauen (GER)
1st in Stage 6 Tour de l'Aude Cycliste Féminin (FRA)
2nd in Stage 10 Women's Challenge (USA)
1st in European Championship, Road, U23, Apremont (FRA)
2004
2nd in Stage 6 Holland Ladies Tour, Haaften (NED)
