= Henri Grasso =

Henri Grasso (1864–1944) was the son of Willem Grasso, founder of Grasso's Royal Machine Factories Ltd. Henri was born to step in his father's shoes. At the age of 19, he follows a refrigeration course in Mittweida, Germany with the latest developments in that field.

== Career ==
In 1894, At the age of 30, Grasso took over the business from his father. Under Henri Grasso's lead, the company grew fast. In 1896, he moved the factory of butter/margarine machines from 's-Hertogenbosch to much larger premises at Vught, The Netherlands. In 1918 Grasso produced the first ammonia refrigeration compressor.

"Henri Grasso of Herzogenbusch (Holland) designs and supplies margarine factories for a diurnal production of 1 to 3 tons of artificial butter."

In 1927, Grasso celebrated his 50 years anniversary as manager. At this time, 260 employees are employed at the Grasso factory with a turnover of more than 0.5 million Euro. Only a few years before he was the manager, there were 18 people working for Grasso. Due to the economic crisis, the number of employees falls back to 50 people. In 1944, Henri Grasso died at the age of 80. In the same year, the factory is almost completely destroyed during World War II so that business comes to a standstill. After the war, the Grasso factory was rebuilt. " After the war Grasso stopped the obsolete production of dairy and margarine machines and went then focus on the worldwide export of refrigeration equipment. The 100th anniversary of Grasso in 1958 and was celebrated for his achievements and interest in the Dutch industry, the company received the designation 'Royal'." In 1947 the first welded compressor was introduced by his company.
