= 2000 Holland Ladies Tour =

Race details
- Dates: September 5 – September 9
- Stages: 6
- Distance: 546.7 km (339.7 mi)
- Winning time: 13h 34' 51"

Results
Jersey awarded to the overall winner	Winner	Mirjam Melchers (NED)	(Dutch National Team)
	Second	Ina-Yoko Teutenberg (GER)	(German National Team)
	Third	Susanne Ljungskog (SWE)	(Farm-Frites Hartol)
Jersey awarded to the points classification winner	Points	Ina-Yoko Teutenberg (GER)	(German National Team)
Jersey awarded to the mountains classification winner	Mountains	Hanka Kupfernagel (GER)	(Bulls-Team Kupfernagel)
Jersey awarded to the youth classification winner	Youth	Mirella van Melis (NED)	(Dutch National Team)
Jersey awarded to the sprints classification winner	Sprints	Mirella van Melis (NED)	(Dutch National Team)

The 3rd edition of the annual Holland Ladies Tour was held from September 5 to September 9, 2000. The women's stage race with an UCI rating of 2.9.2 started in Bergeijk, and ended in Dronten.

== Stages ==
=== 2000-09-05: Bergeijk — Bergeijk (120 km) ===
Place	Stage 1		General Classification	
Place	Name	Time	Name	Time
1.	Mirella van Melis (NED)	02:53.15	Mirella van Melis (NED)	02:52.59
2.	Jorunn Kvalo (NOR)	+0.02	Jorunn Kvalo (NOR)	+0.08
3.	Debby Mansveld (NED)	+0.13	Debby Mansveld (NED)	+0.25

Source: cyclingnews.com

=== 2000-09-06: Tegelen — Tegelen (115 km) ===
Place	Stage 2		General Classification	
Place	Name	Time	Name	Time
1.	Madeleine Lindberg (SWE)	02:59.46	Mirella van Melis (NED)	05:52.44
2.	Chantal Beltman (NED)	—	Jorunn Kvalo (NOR)	+0.09
3.	Ina-Yoko Teutenberg (GER)	—	Madeleine Lindberg (SWE)	+0.20

Source: cyclingnews.com

=== 2000-09-07: Neerijnen — Neerijnen (124 km) ===
Place	Stage 3		General Classification	
Place	Name	Time	Name	Time
1.	Mirjam Melchers (NED)	03:00.38	Mirella van Melis (NED)	08:53.13
2.	Ina-Yoko Teutenberg (GER)	—	Mirjam Melchers (NED)	+0.23
3.	Mirella van Melis (NED)	—	Ina-Yoko Teutenberg (GER)	+0.29

Source: cyclingnews.com

=== 2000-09-08: Valkenburg — Valkenburg (88.4 km) ===
Place	Stage 4		General Classification	
Place	Name	Time	Name	Time
1.	Arenda Grimberg (NED)	02:23.28	Mirjam Melchers (NED)	11:17.10
2.	Ina-Yoko Teutenberg (GER)	+0.09	Ina-Yoko Teutenberg (GER)	+0.03
3.	Chantal Beltman (NED)	—	Susanne Ljungskog (SWE)	+0.18

Source: cyclingnews.com

=== 2000-09-09: Dronten — Dronten (80 km) ===
Place	Stage 5-A		General Classification	
Place	Name	Time	Name	Time
1.	Ina-Yoko Teutenberg (GER)	01:52.43	Ina-Yoko Teutenberg (GER)	13:09.47
2.	Mirella van Melis (NED)	—	Mirjam Melchers (NED)	+0.06
3.	Sonja van Kuik (NED)	—	Susanne Ljungskog (SWE)	+0.24

Source: cyclingnews.com

=== 2000-09-09: Dronten — Dronten (19.3 km) ===
Place	Stage 5-b (Individual Time Trial)		General Classification	
Place	Name	Time	Name	Time
1.	Hanka Kupfernagel (GER)	00:24.02,01	Mirjam Melchers (NED)	13:34.51
2.	Mirjam Melchers (NED)	+0.45,36	Ina-Yoko Teutenberg (GER)	+0.13
3.	Susanne Ljungskog (SWE)	+0.50,24	Susanne Ljungskog (SWE)	+0.19

Source: cyclingnews.com

== Final standings ==
=== General classification ===
RANK	NAME	TEAM	TIME
1.	Mirjam Melchers (NED)	Dutch National Team	13:34.51
2.	Ina-Yoko Teutenberg (GER)	German National Team	+ 0.13
3.	Susanne Ljungskog (SWE)	Farm-Frites Hartol	+ 0.19
4.	Cindy Pieters (BEL)	Vlaanderen 2002	+ 1.06
5.	Heidi Van De Vijver (BEL)	Vlaanderen 2002	+ 1.08
6.	Mirella van Melis (NED)	Dutch National Team	+ 2.58
7.	Hanka Kupfernagel (GER)	Bulls-Team Kupfernagel	+ 5.48
8.	Chantal Beltman (NED)	Dutch National Team	+ 7.02
9.	Trixi Worrack (GER)	German National Team	+ 7.19
10.	Madeleine Lindberg (SWE)	Farm-Frites Hartol	+ 7.44

=== Points classification ===
RANK	NAME	TEAM	POINTS
1.	Ina-Yoko Teutenberg (GER)	German National Team	88
2.	Mirjam Melchers (NED)	Dutch National Team	77
3.	Mirella van Melis (NED)	Dutch National Team	75

=== Mountains classification ===
RANK	NAME	TEAM	POINTS
1.	Hanka Kupfernagel (GER)	Bulls-Team Kupfernagel	31
2.	Yvonne Brunen (NED)	Farm-Frites Hartol	19
3.	Mirjam Melchers (NED)	Dutch National Team	18

=== Best young rider classification ===
RANK	NAME	TEAM	TIME
1.	Mirella van Melis (NED)	Dutch National Team	13:37.49
2.	Trixi Worrack (GER)	German National Team	+ 04.21
3.	Evy Van Damme (BEL)	Vlaanderen 2002	+ 06.33

=== Sprint classification ===
RANK	NAME	TEAM	POINTS
1.	Mirella van Melis (NED)	Dutch National Team	16
2.	Mirjam Melchers (NED)	Dutch National Team	9
3.	Jorunn Kvalo (NOR)	Norwegian National Team	7

== Teams ==
- Farm-Frites Hartol
- Dutch National Team
- Westland Wil Vooruit
- Ondernemers van Nature
- Vlaanderen 2002
- Alberts Vrienden
- German National Team
- Norwegian National Team
- Red-Bull
- Team Ahoy-Tuscany-Spain
- Bulls-Team Kupfernagel
- Team Letchworth
- Trek-Sjef van Bergen
- Rodania Sponsor
