= Michael Rogge =

Dutch photographer (1929–2024)

Michael Rogge (27 May 1929 – 26 January 2024), also known as IJsbrand Rogge or Ysbrand Rogge, was a Dutch photographer, videographer and amateur filmmaker, best known for his depictions of post-WW2 life in the Far East, in particular, Hong Kong and Japan.

== Early life and education ==
Rogge was born on 27 May 1929 in Amsterdam. His parents were Thea Rogge and her husband IJsbrand Rogge, a Dutch mining prospector based in Dutch Indonesia. His father was born in Indonesia in 1875 and moved to Java in 1891.

He was christened IJsbrand Cornelius Rogge (IJ is a Dutch ligature and pronounced together as a vowel), but later adopted the alias Michael, for the benefit of working with non-Dutchmen.

Rogge recalled viewing films on his father's home movie projector at the age of two and that, in 1939, at the age of 10, he inherited it. He has stated that, in 1942, he received a Kodak Box camera as a gift, and a Kine Exakta camera in 1947, and was able to purchase a used 9.5mm movie camera.

He studied at the HBS in Deventer and completed his education in 1948. According to Rogge, he left the Netherlands to work in the Far East in 1949.

== Hong Kong and Japan ==
In 1949, Rogge moved to Hong Kong to work at the Nederlandsch-Indische Handelsbank (that later became Nationale Handelsbank in 1950 and Rotterdamsche Bank in 1960).

After spending six years in Hong Kong, he moved to Japan in 1955, where he lived until 1960 and made several films on life in Japan.

In Japan, he joined his bank colleague Hans Brinckmann to travel the countryside during their weekends. During those trips, they photographed scenic landscapes and the lifestyles of ordinary Japanese people, their political struggle, as well as their cultural heritage, including their arts and crafts and religious ceremonies.

=== Return to Europe ===
In 1961, he returned to Hong Kong to spend a month there and make a documentary.

== Films ==
Rogge shot films while living and working in Hong Kong and on his later travel to Ireland. He has been a collector of old travelogue footage. He has posted and shared these films online, providing a historical record of the locations.

Rogge's 1953 short film The Turn of the Tide is thought to be one of the first independent short films made in Hong Kong. It narrates the story of the relationship between a young fisherman boy based in Yau Ma Tei Typhoon Shelter and his terminally ill friend. It demonstrated Rogge's abilities extending to drama.

Around 1959–1960, Rogge and Hans Brinckmann had made a 25-minute documentary titled Washo! on how life changed in post-war Japan. In 2005, excerpts from Washo! (including narration) were reproduced in a documentary telecast by the Japanese national TV broadcaster NHK.

In 1961, the Dutch television station VPRO commissioned Rogge to make the documentary film Three Million Souls of Hong Kong, which he completed in 1962.

The Hong Kong film archive has called the 200 minutes of film that Rogge shot in Hong Kong between 1949 and 1954 "an extremely valuable artifact for Hong Kong".

Although some of his early works were originally silent films, many were edited with voice over commentaries, music and sound effects. Rogge had uploaded these films onto YouTube for preservation since 2006 until his death, gaining 533,000 subscribers as of 2025.

=== Filmography ===
Title	Year	Color	Language	Duration	Location	Notes	Refs
Washo!	1959			25 min	Japan	Documentary	
Sunrise	1953	Color	Silent	8 min	Hong Kong		
Rain	1952			3.5 min	Hong Kong		
Introducing Hong Kong	1951			23.5 min	Hong Kong		
Hong Kong Celebrates the Coronation of Her Majesty Queen Elizabeth II	1953			16 min	Hong Kong		
1949 Strolling from Macdonnell Road into Hong Kong Central	1949			4.5 min	Hong Kong		
Turn of the Tide	1953			20 min	Hong Kong	Semi-documentary	
Three Million Souls of Hong Kong	1962			42 min	Hong Kong	Documentary	

== Legacy ==
=== 2008 exhibition in Tokyo ===
An exhibition entitled Showa Japan seen through Dutch eyes was held in Tokyo at Fujifilm Square from 29 August to 30 September 2008. This included works from Rogge and Hans Brinckmann, his former colleague and Dutch writer, who were working for the same bank branch and living in Japan during the 1955–1960 period. This exhibition attracted 49,000 people. This included Washo!, a documentary about "the old and the new Japan", that narrated the unresolved hostility and conflicts in post-WW2 Japanese society, in the background of fierce opposition to the Japan-US Security Treaty. It portrayed how labor relations had eroded in Japan during that period, which led to political agitations causing violent demonstrations on the streets of Tokyo.

From 18 January to 28 February 2009, the same exhibition was partly repeated at the Foreign Correspondents' Club of Japan (FCCJ), Tokyo and appeared as the featured cover story for the February 2009 edition of FCCJ's magazine, Number 1 Shimbun.

Photographic material presented in this exhibition also appeared in the book titled Showa Japan: The Post-War Golden Age and Its Troubled Legacy brought out by Brinckmann.

=== 2014 seminar in Hong Kong ===
A seminar titled Michael Rogge and his Hong Kong of the 1950s was held in Hong Kong during 2014. This included an exhibition titled "Michael Rogge Retrospective" and organized into two separate sessions titled Retrospective (1) and Retrospective (2). The screenings were accompanied by live music composed by Maud Nelissen.

== Death ==
Rogge died in Amsterdam on 26 January 2024, at the age of 94.
