= Grasso's industrial refrigeration equipment =

The former company Grasso is part of GEA Group since 1991. GEA's energy efficient and sustainable technologies - including industrial refrigeration, gas compression, separation and emission reduction - span all industries served by GEA.

The former headquarters in Den Bosch
