= Venhorst =

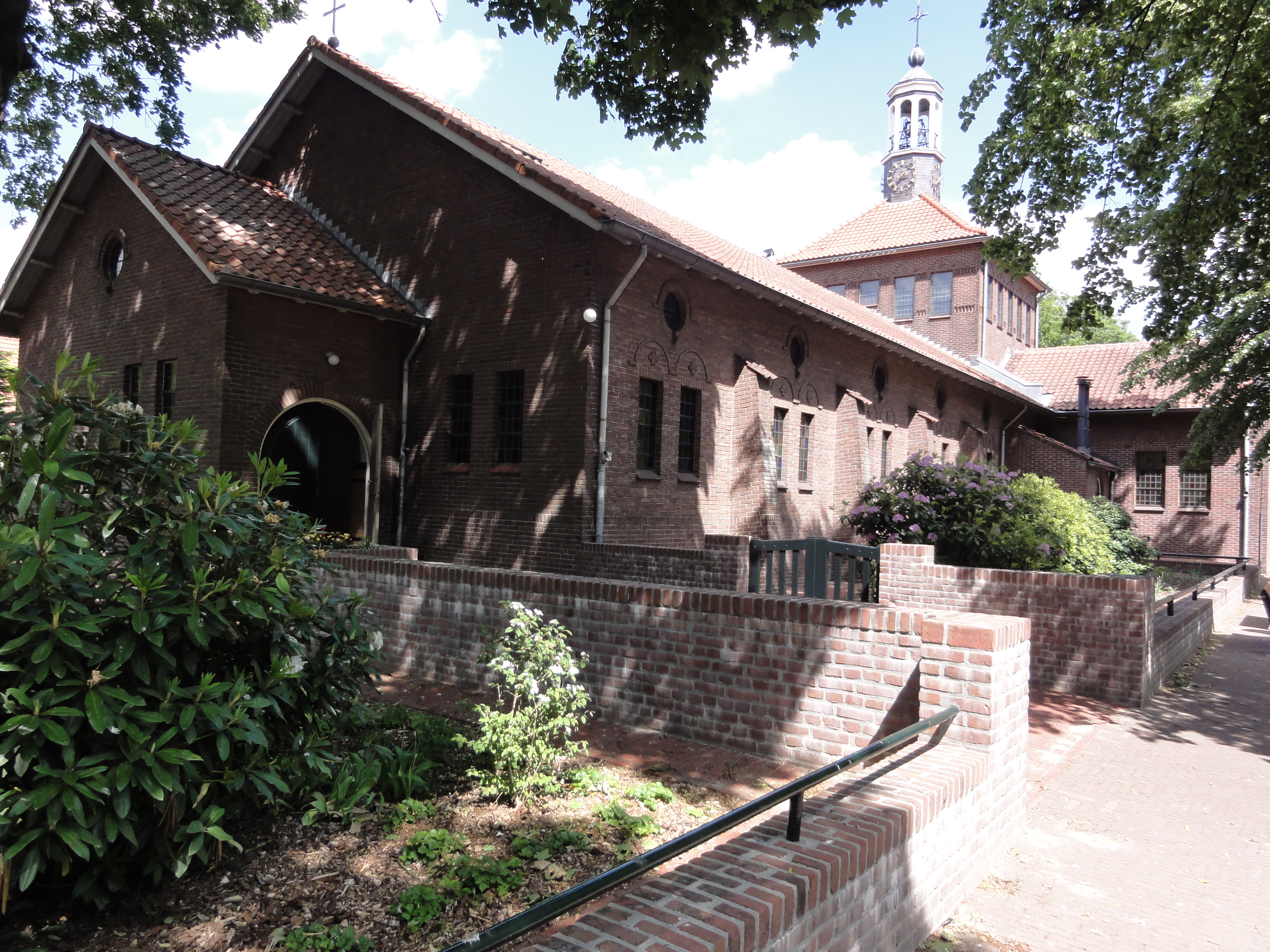
- Sint-Josefkerk Venhorst

- Flag Coat of arms

- Location in the province of North Brabant in the Netherlands Venhorst (Netherlands)
- Coordinates: 51°36′30″N 5°44′20″E
- Country: Netherlands
- Province: North Brabant
- Municipality: Boekel

Area
  - Total: 10.99 km^{2} (4.24 sq mi)
- Elevation: 22 m (72 ft)

Population (2021)
  - Total: 1,755
  - Density: 159.7/km^{2} (413.6/sq mi)
- Time zone: UTC+1 (CET)
  - Summer (DST): UTC+2 (CEST)
- Postal code: 5428
- Dialing code: 0492

Venhorst is a village in the municipality of Boekel, Netherlands.

== History ==
The village was founded as Sint-Jozefpeel after the large-scale Peel reclamation began, that is after 1920. In 1934 the parish church was consecrated: even now the existing Sint-Jozef church.

In particular, the PTT insisted on renaming the village, to avoid confusion with other places. From 1936 the village was called Venhorst, after the many fens that occurred in the area and the horst on which the village lay.

Gradually the village grew. There was a modest middle class and small business in the still predominantly agricultural village, where now the grandscale pigfarming and related services are central. Venhorst located near the busy Middenpeelweg.

Despite the limited size of the village there is still a thriving society, consisting of a carnival, fanfare, a shooting club, a folk dance, and a choir. The village also has numerous sport associations, such as football, korfball and tennis.

A local party called: Gemeenschapsbelang Venhorst (Community Interest Venhorst), serves on the council of Boekel.
