= Huize Padua =

Hamlet in North Brabant, the Netherlands

Coordinates: 51°35′N 5°43′E

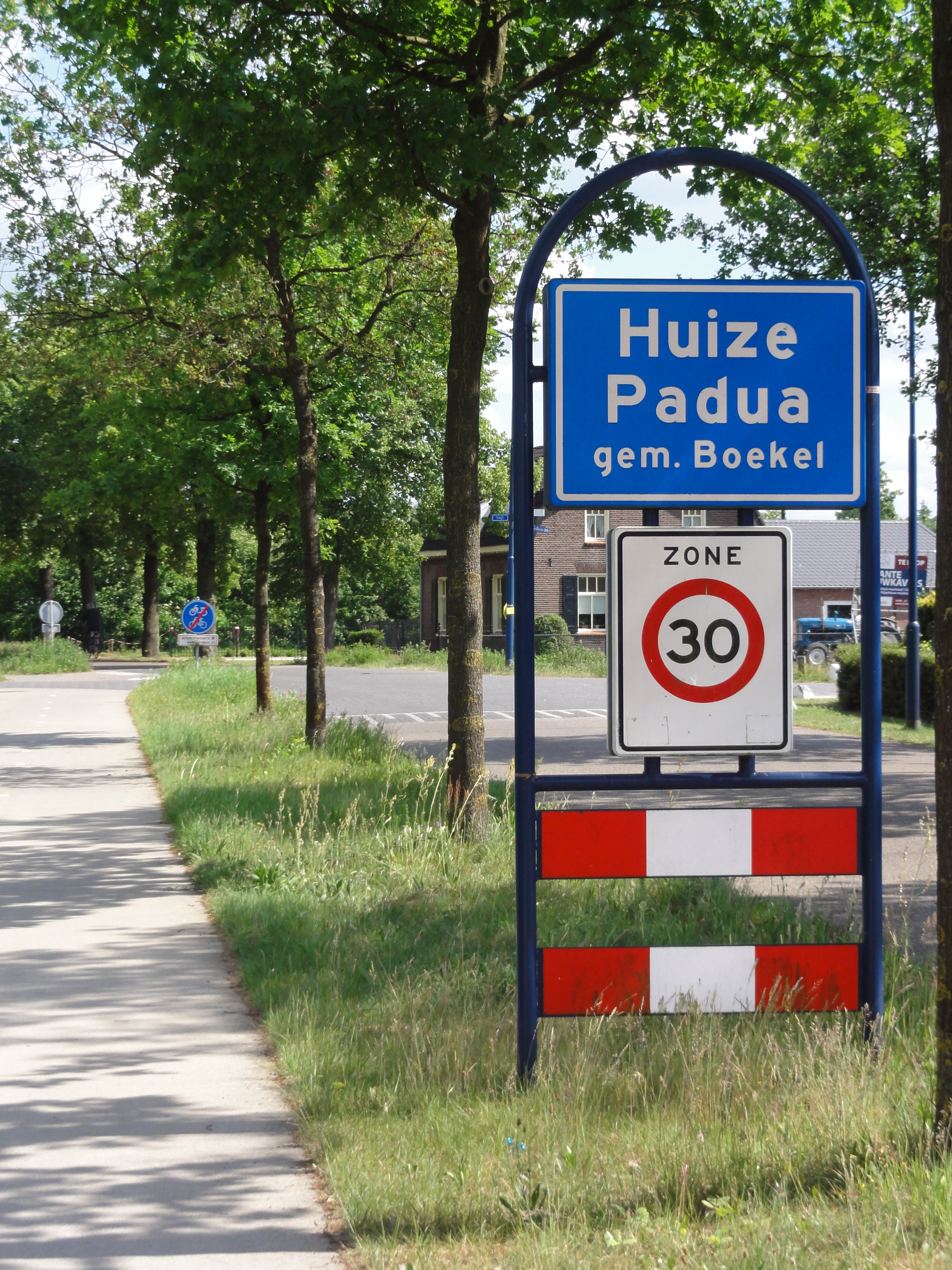

Huize Padua is a hamlet in the Dutch province of North Brabant, in the municipality of Boekel.
