= Herpen =

- Village
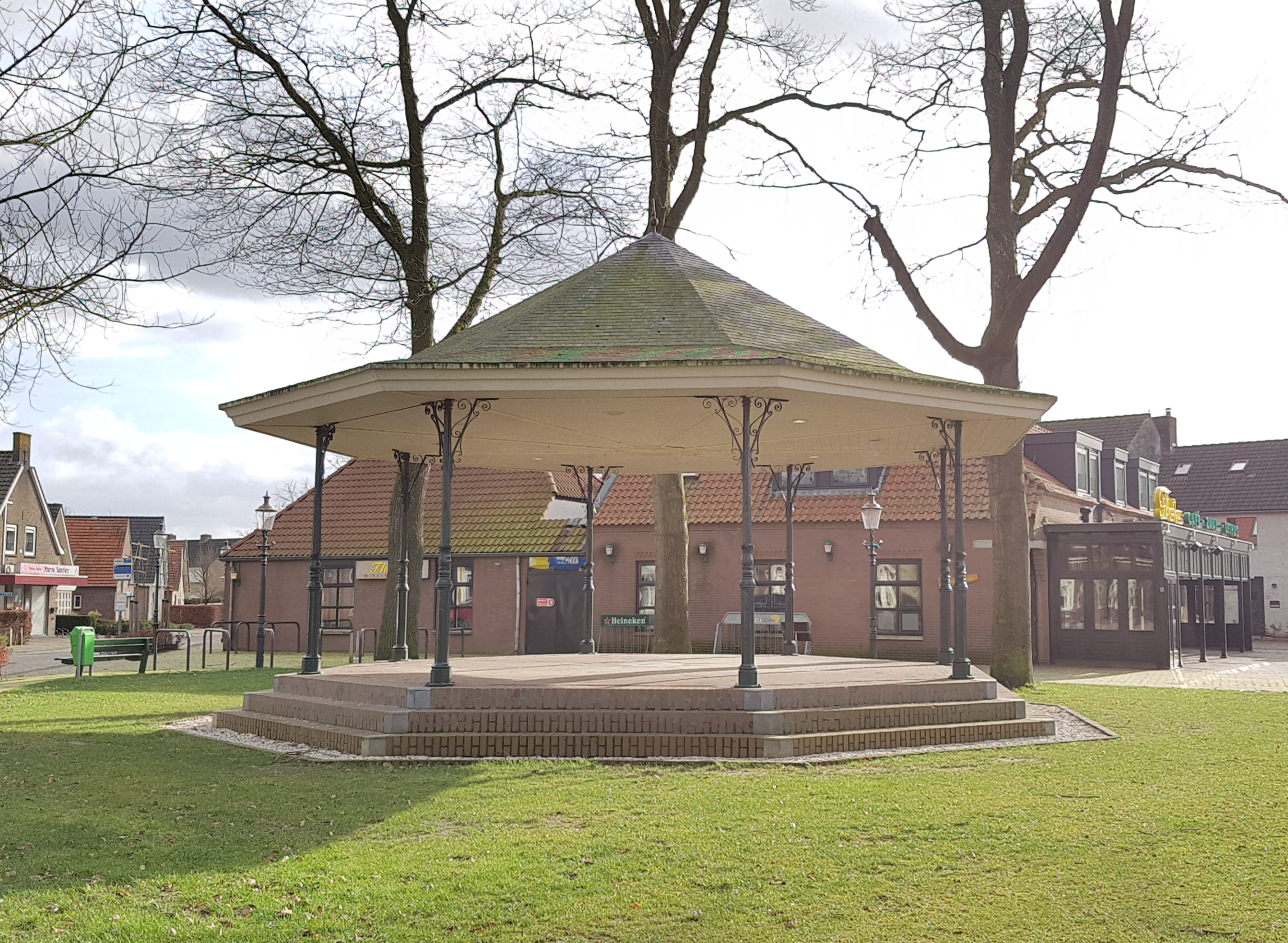
- Bandstand

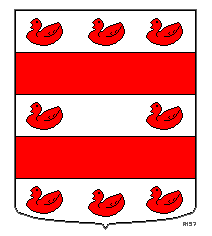
- Flag Coat of arms

- Location in the province of North Brabant in the Netherlands Herpen (Netherlands)
- Coordinates: 51°46′18″N 5°38′30″E
- Country: Netherlands
- Province: North Brabant
- Municipality: Oss

Area
  - Total: 5.51 km^{2} (2.13 sq mi)
- Elevation: 8 m (26 ft)

Population (2021)
  - Total: 2,605
  - Density: 473/km^{2} (1,220/sq mi)
- Time zone: UTC+1 (CET)
  - Summer (DST): UTC+2 (CEST)
- Postal code: 5373
- Dialing code: 0486

Herpen is a village in North Brabant. It lies between Oss and Nijmegen.

Since 2003, Herpen is part of municipality Oss. In the period 1941 - 2003 it was part of municipality Ravenstein, a small city near the river Maas. Before 1941, Herpen had its own municipality, covering the villages Overlangel and Koolwijk.

In the early history, Herpen was the home of Alard van Herpen, a medieval lord. The region was then called "Herpina" or "Het land van Herpen" (Land of Herpen), covering what would later be known as the Land of Ravenstein. Herpen was a central hub, but with the coming of river trade in a later stage, the city of Ravenstein became due to its location at the Maas the main trading hub.

Herpen is known for its "verenigings-leven" (meaning that the community is doing much for each other). They have a soccer club, called Herpinia, a tennis club called VIP and several smaller unions. Each year, with the Dutch carnival, a lot of people flock to Herpen to see its parade. Other events are the annual markets and festivals. These are used by foundations as "Stichting Herpen Woord en Beeld" en "Stichting Carnival" to finance other events or happenings in the community.

The people from Herpen are sometimes referred to as "Bonne", meaning "beans". With carnival Herpen becomes "Bonneland". This is a reference to the beans that were a main product from Herpen's farmers.

The small community "Koolwijk" is (unofficially) considered as a part of Herpen.

== Gallery ==
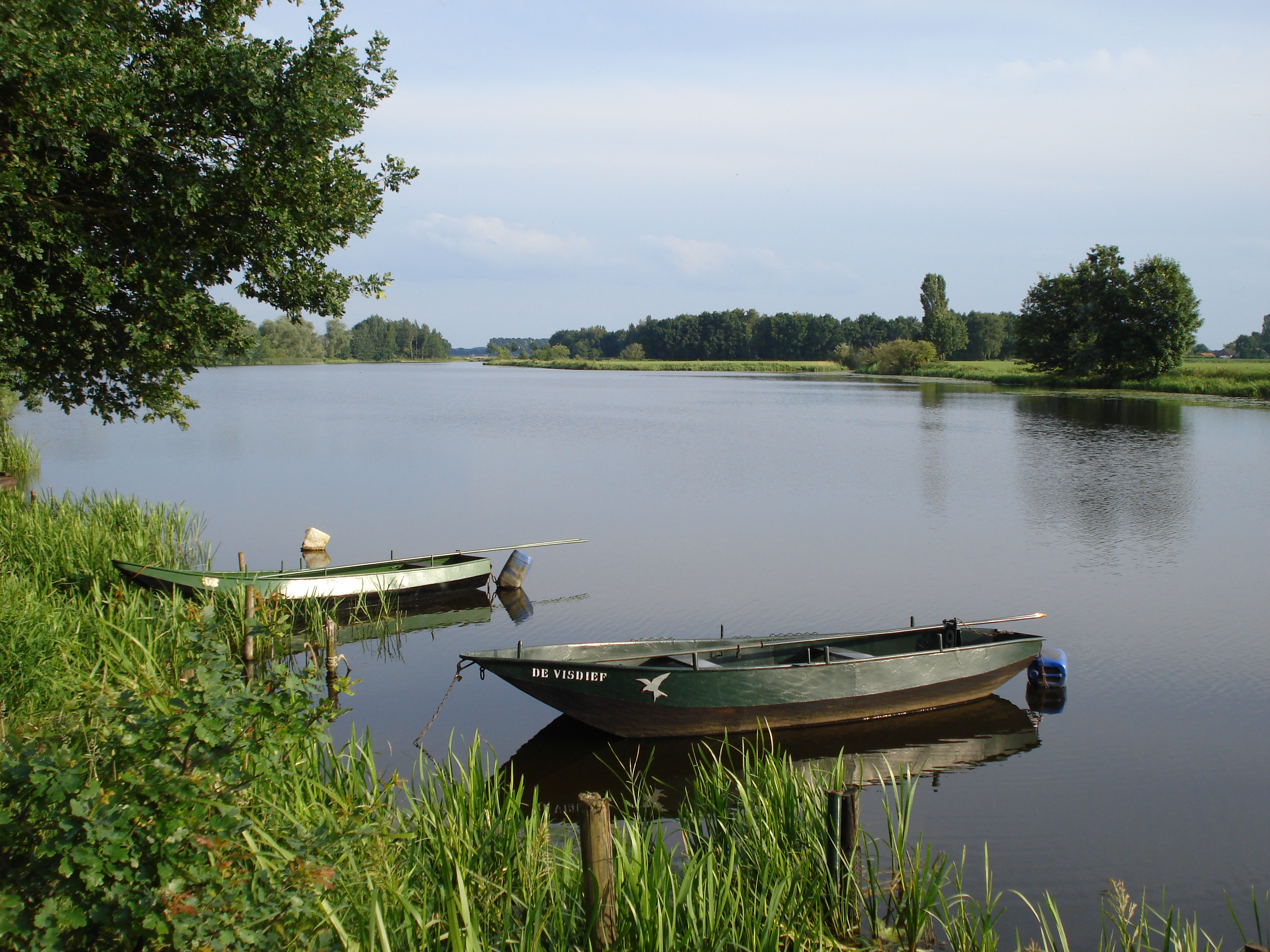
Hertogswetering near Herpen

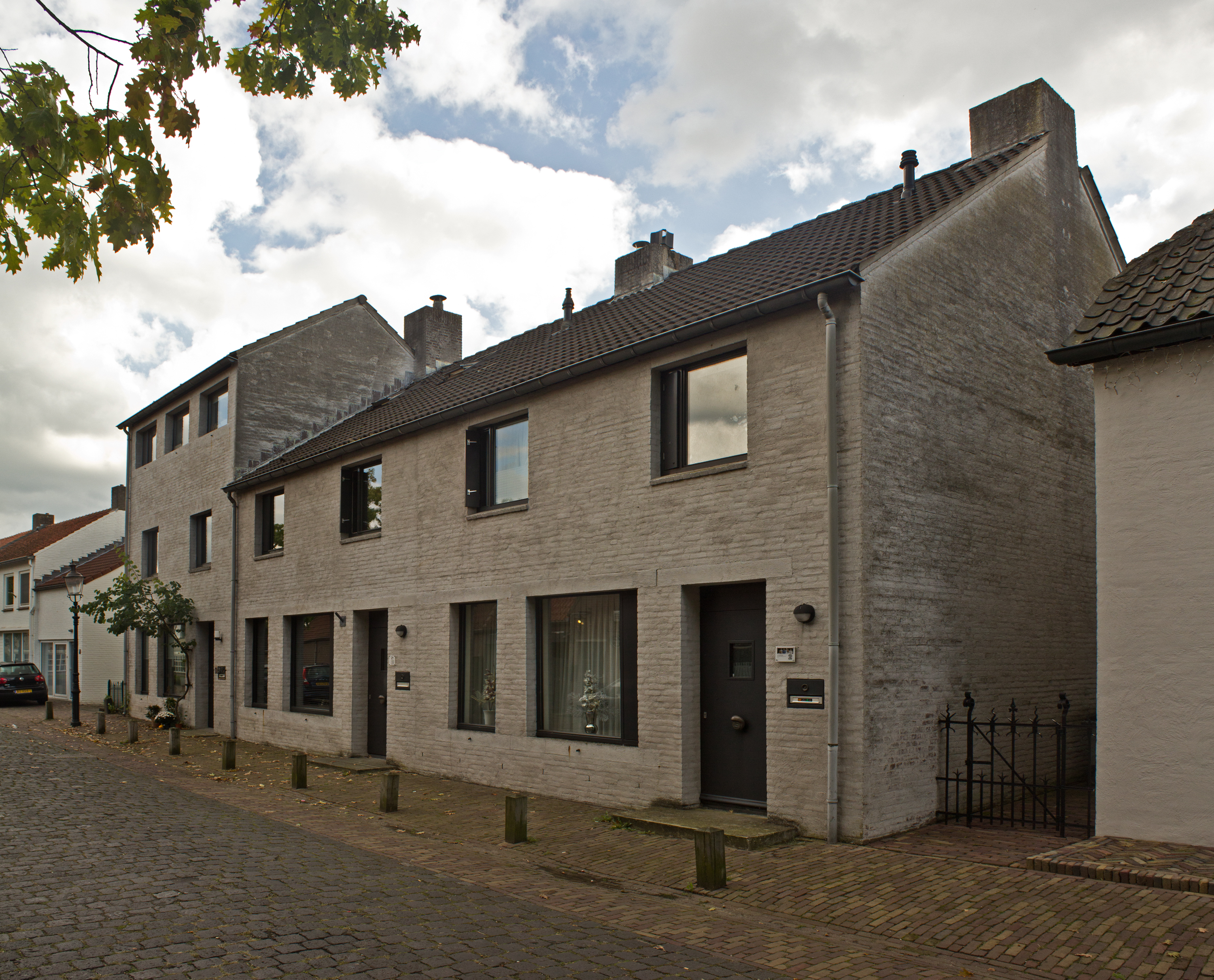
Houses in Herpen

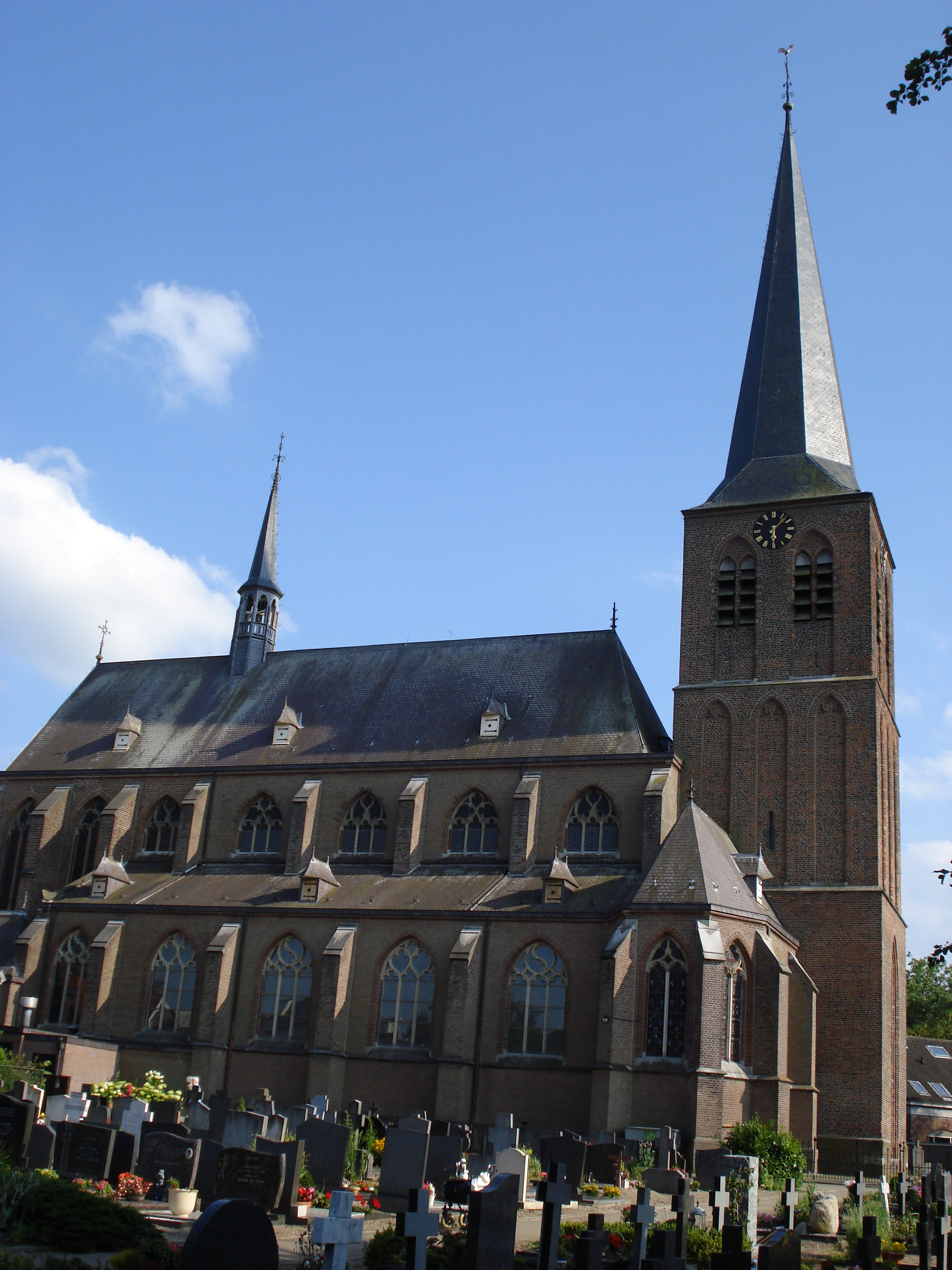
Church in Herpen

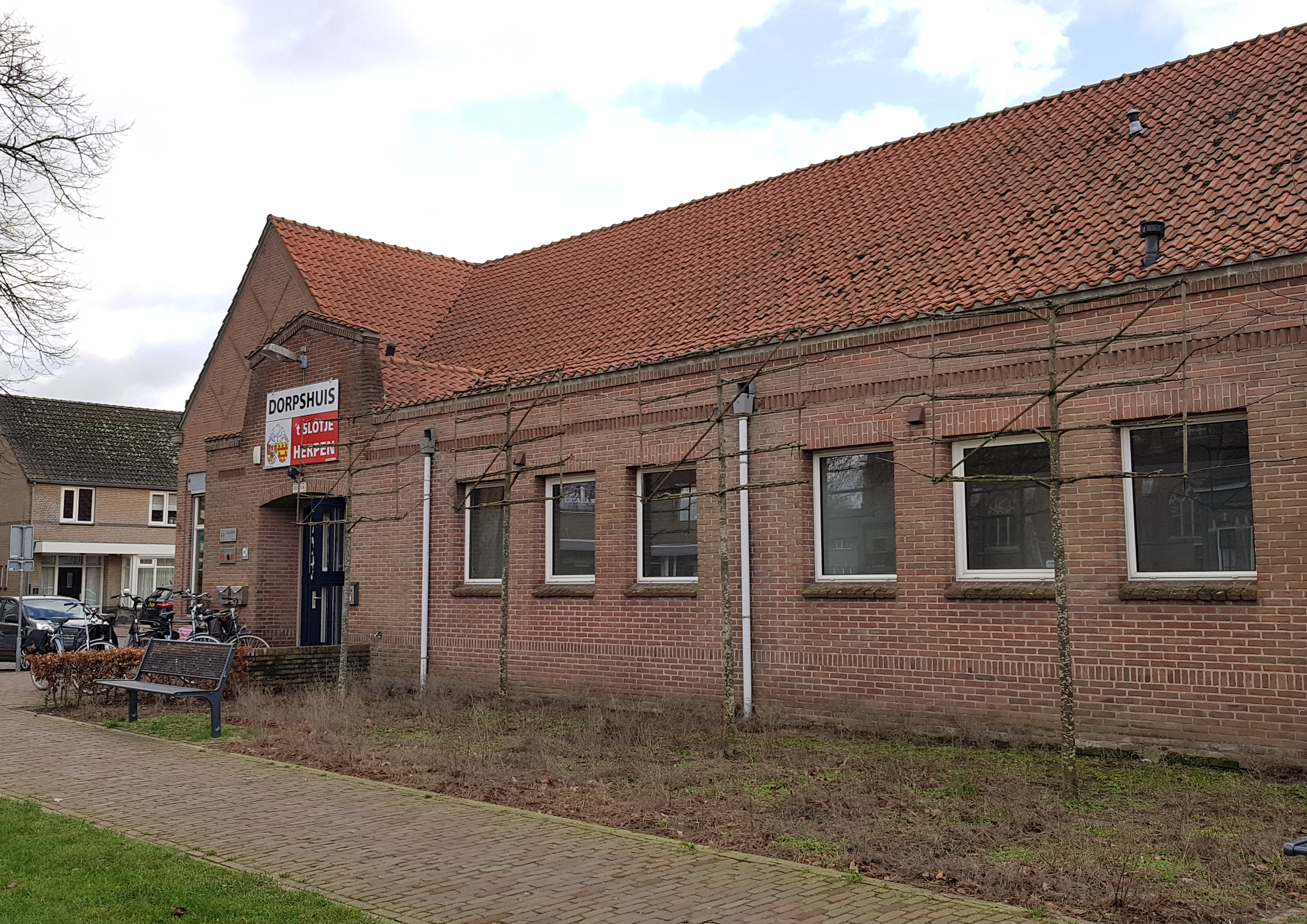
Village house 't Slotje
