= Ravenstein, Netherlands =

Ravenstein
- City
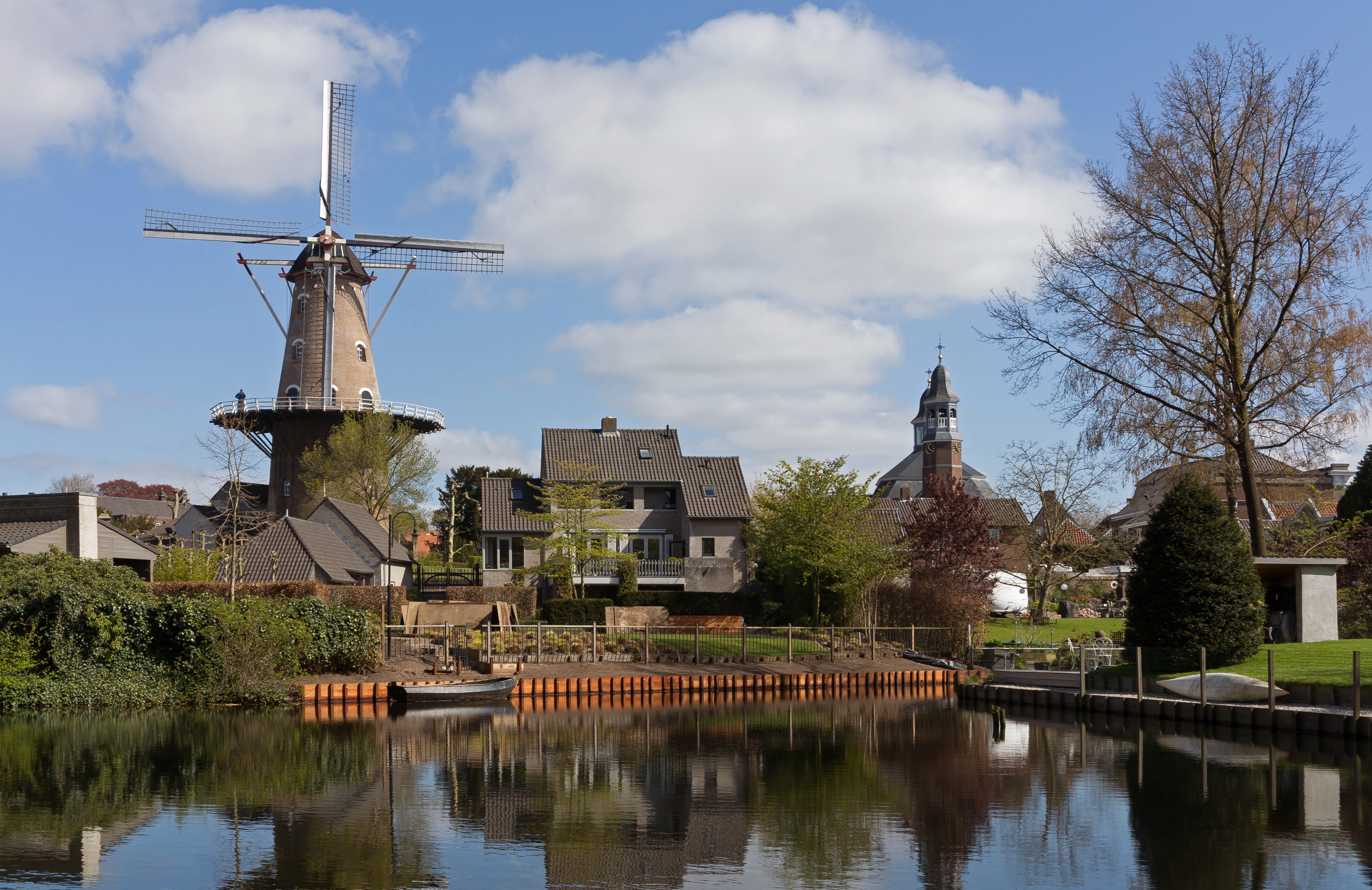
- View on Ravenstein

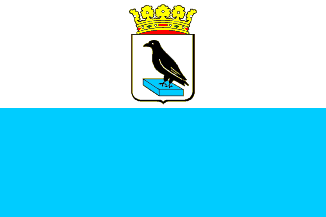
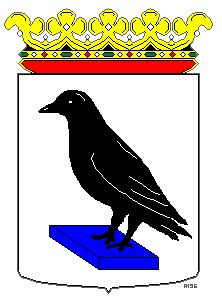
- Flag Coat of arms

- Location in the province of North Brabant in the Netherlands Ravenstein (Netherlands)
- Coordinates: 51°47′49.28″N 5°39′5.68″E
- Country: Netherlands
- Province: North Brabant
- Municipality: Oss

Area
  - Total: 5.30 km^{2} (2.05 sq mi)
- Elevation: 11 m (36 ft)

Population (2021)
  - Total: 3,410
  - Density: 643/km^{2} (1,670/sq mi)
- Time zone: UTC+1 (CET)
  - Summer (DST): UTC+2 (CEST)
- Postal code: 5358 & 5371
- Dialing code: 0486

Ravenstein is a city and a former municipality in the south of the Netherlands, in the province of North Brabant. The former municipality covered an area of 42.68 km² (of which 0.96 km² water). In 2003 it was incorporated into the city of Oss.

Ravenstein was founded by Walraven van Valkenburg. It received city rights in 1380. From 1631 until 1796, Ravenstein and the surrounding area were part of the Duchy of Palatinate-Neuburg and was a Catholic enclave within the Dutch Republic.

== Land van Ravenstein ==
In 1360, Ravenstein became part of the Land van Ravenstein, and received city rights in 1380. Philip of Cleves, Lord of Ravenstein died in 1528 without successors, and the land became part of the Duchy of Cleves. In 1609, it became part of the Margraviate of Brandenburg who sold the Dutch Republic the right to fortify Ravenstein and maintain troops in the city. In 1631, it changed hands to the Duchy of Palatinate-Neuburg, and became a Catholic enclave within the Dutch Republic. The Land van Ravenstein was conquered by France in 1794, and sold to the Batavian Republic (the predecessor of the Kingdom of the Netherlands) in 1800. In 1814, it became part of the province of North Brabant.

== History ==
In 1360, Ravenstein was founded by Walraven van Valkenburg who moved his castle from Herpen to the bank of the river Maas. In 1380, it received city rights and a wall was built around the city with three gates. The fortification were renewed between 1522 and 1526, but demolished in 1543 by order of Charles V, Holy Roman Emperor. Around 1621, the city was refortified by the Dutch Republic. In 1630, the city became part of the Duchy of Palatinate-Neuburg, and a catholic enclave within the Dutch Republic. In 1635, a garrison of the Dutch Republic was stationed in Ravenstein and stayed until 1672. In 1794, Ravenstein was conquered by France and sold to the Batavian Republic in 1800. In 1818, the castle was demolished. In 1872, a railway station was built in Ravenstein and the city started to industrialise.

Ravenstein was home to 875 people in 1840. It was an independent municipality until 2003 when it was merged into Oss.

== Former municipality ==
Ravenstein also included the following towns, villages and townships: Demen, Dennenburg, Deursen, Dieden, Herpen, Huisseling, Keent, Koolwijk, Neerlangel, Neerloon, Overlangel.

Dieden, Demen en Langel was a separate municipality until 1923, when it was merged with Ravenstein.

== Transport ==
- Ravenstein railway station

Ravenstein lies directly to the A50, the highway from Eindhoven to Nijmegen. Close is Paalgraven junction, where the A59 divericates to 's-Hertogenbosch (25 km) and the A2 (20 km), the main road from north to south in the Netherlands.

== Gallery ==
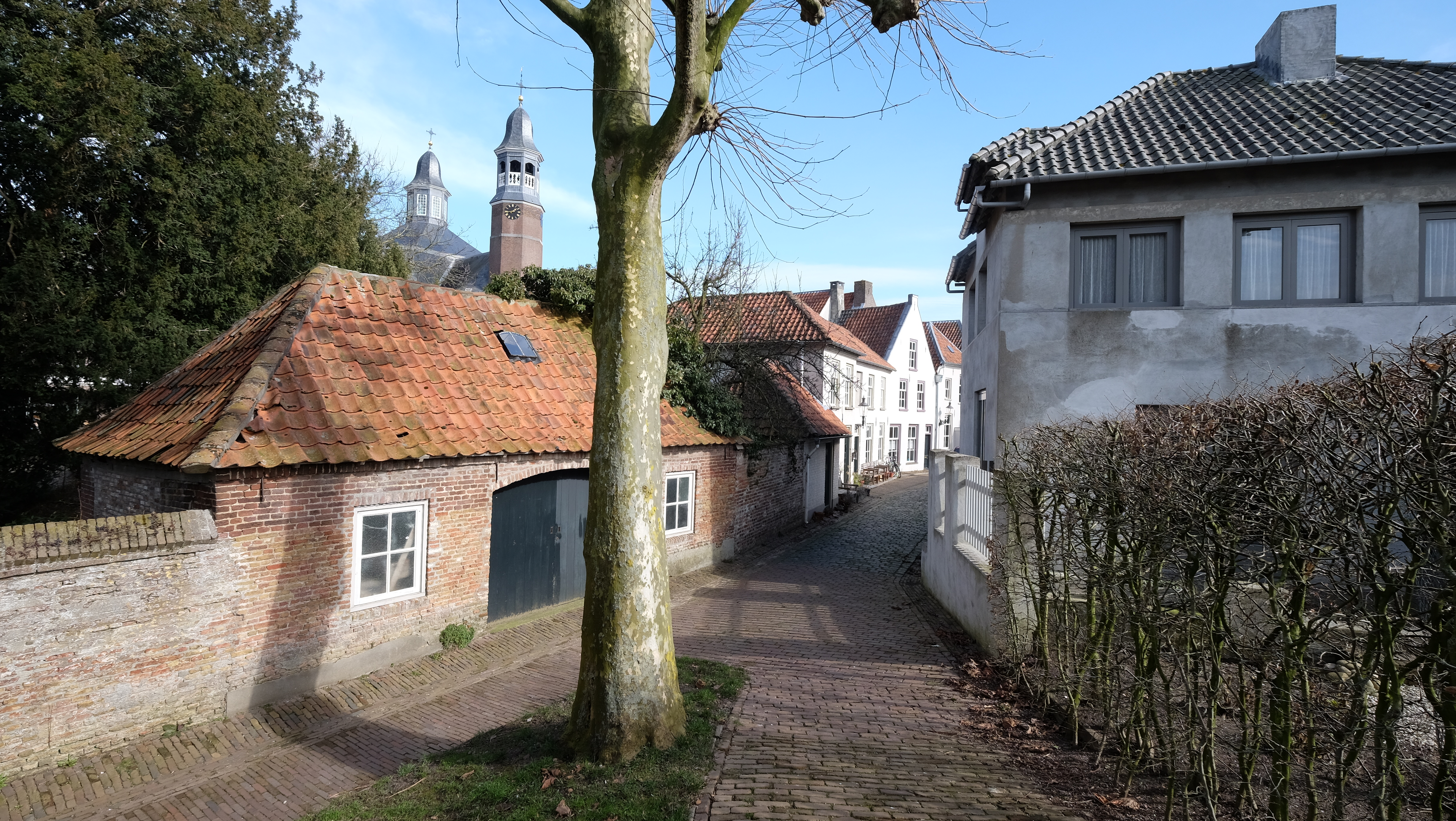
Street in Ravenstein

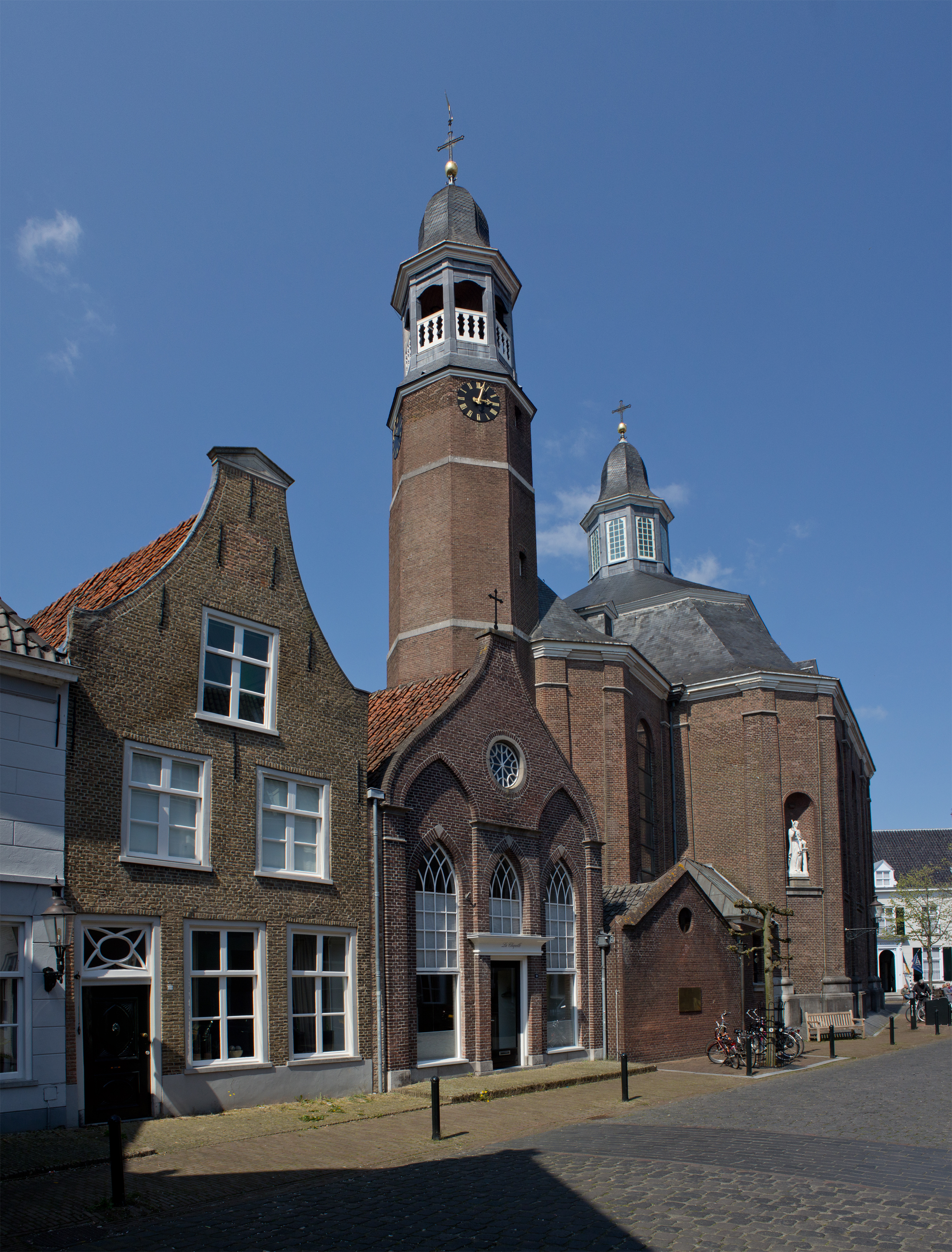
St Lucia Church

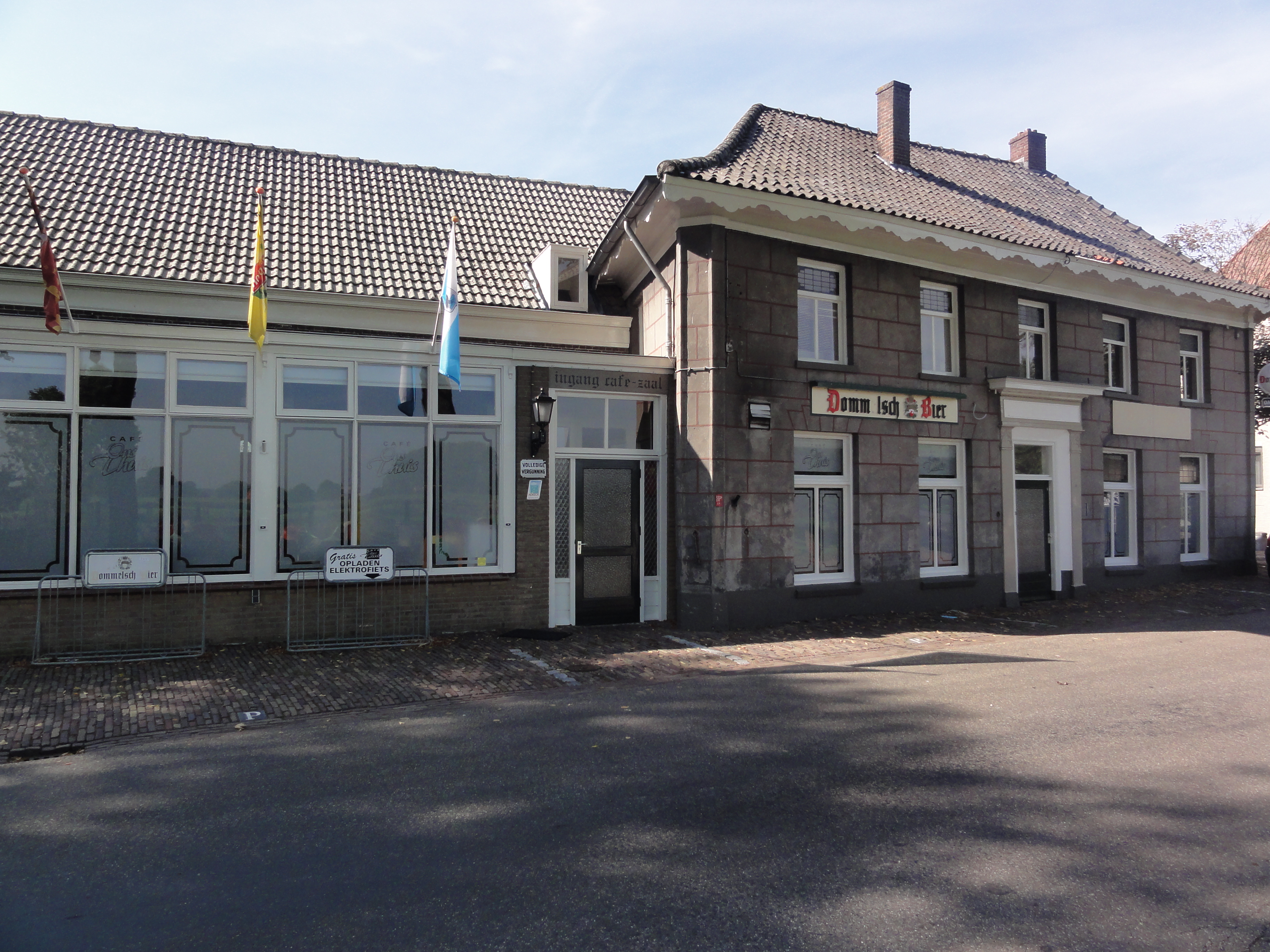
Building in Ravenstein

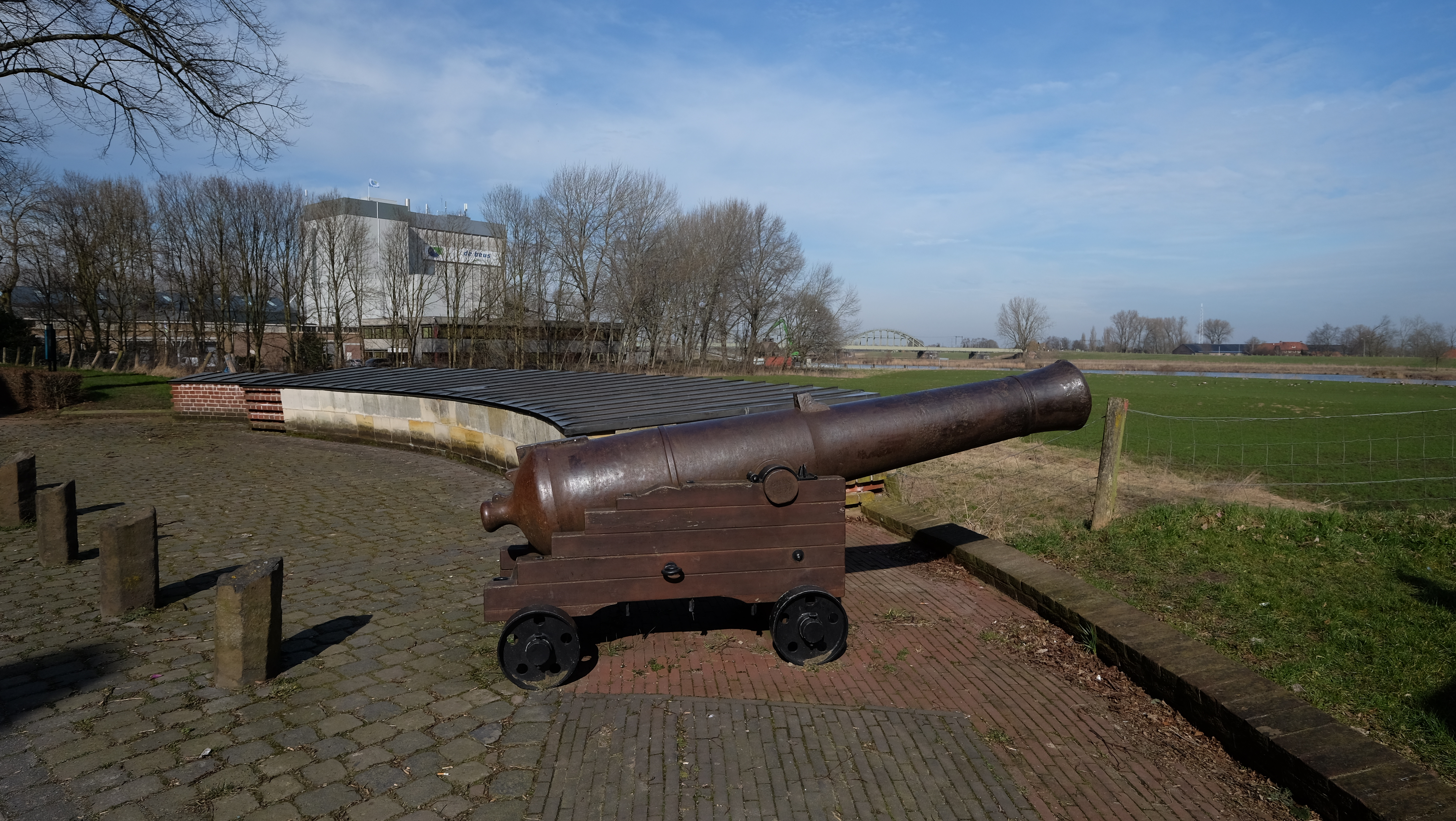
Bulwark of Ravenstein

== See also ==
- Duchy of Cleves, later Cleves-Jülich
- War of the Jülich Succession
