= Dutch Waterline =

Defensive flooding system

Old Dutch Waterline New Dutch Waterline
- Netherlands
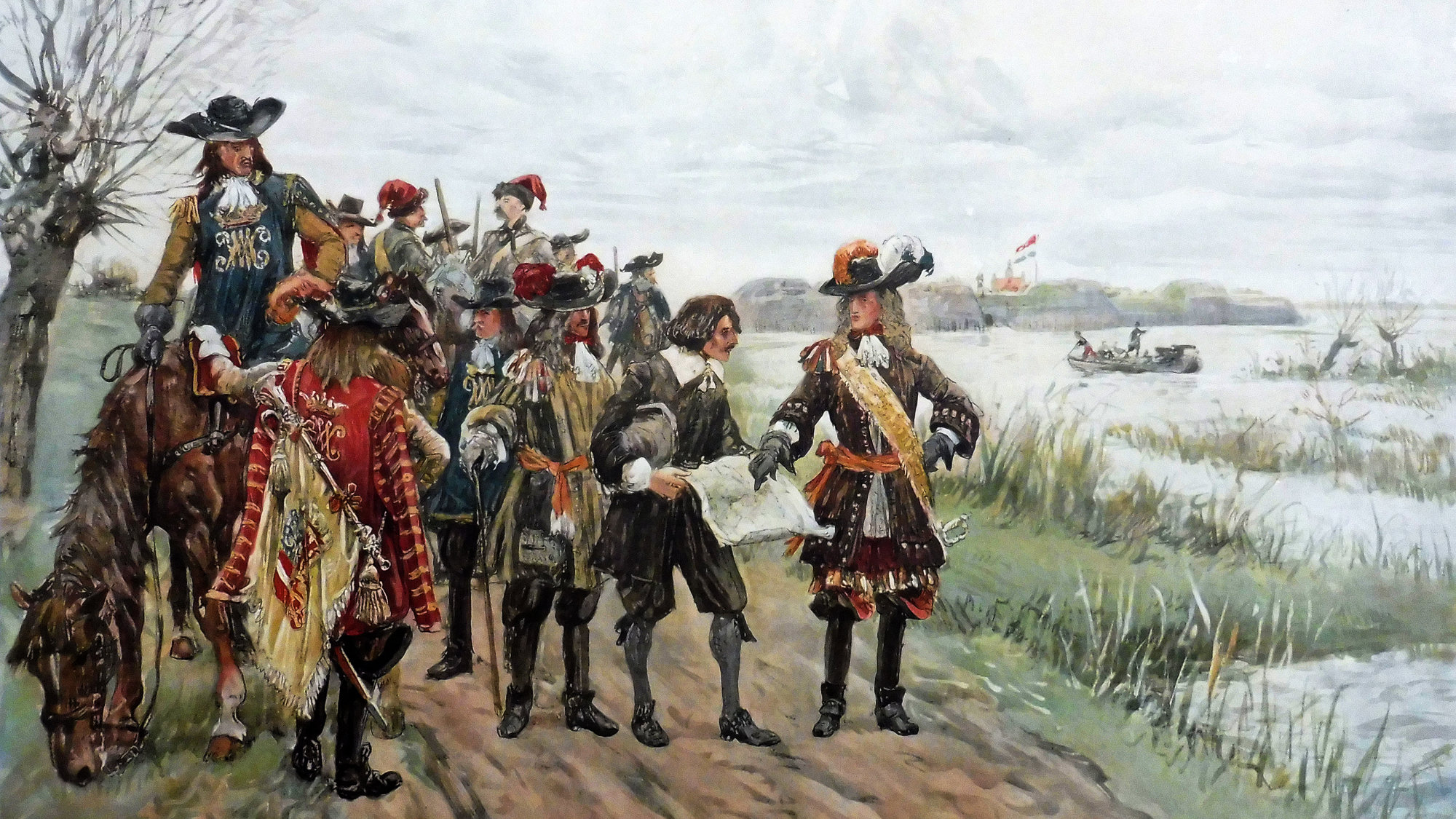
- William III of Orange inspects the Waterline during the Franco-Dutch War

Site information
- Type: Defensive line
- Controlled by: Netherlands

Site history
- Built: 1629–1815 (Old); 1815–1940 (New)
- In use: 1629–1940
- Materials: Flooded plains, sluices, earth walls, brick, concrete, steel
- Battles/wars: Franco-Dutch War

The Dutch Waterline (Dutch: Hollandsche Waterlinie; modern spelling: Hollandse Waterlinie) was a series of water-based defences conceived by Maurice of Nassau in the early 17th century and realised by his half brother Frederick Henry. Combined with natural bodies of water, the waterline could be used to transform Holland, the westernmost region of the Netherlands and adjacent to the North Sea, almost into an island. In the 19th century, the Waterline was extended to include Utrecht. In 2021 the line was added to the Defence Line of Amsterdam to become the Dutch Water Defence Lines UNESCO World Heritage Site.

== History ==
Early in the 16th-century Eighty Years' War of independence against Spain, the Dutch Republic realized that flooding low-lying areas formed an excellent defence against enemy troops. This was demonstrated, for example, during the Siege of Leiden in 1574. In the latter half of the war, when the province of Holland had been freed of Spanish troops, Maurice of Nassau planned to defend it with a line of flooded land protected by fortresses that ran from the Zuiderzee (present IJsselmeer) down to the river Waal.

=== Old Dutch Waterline ===
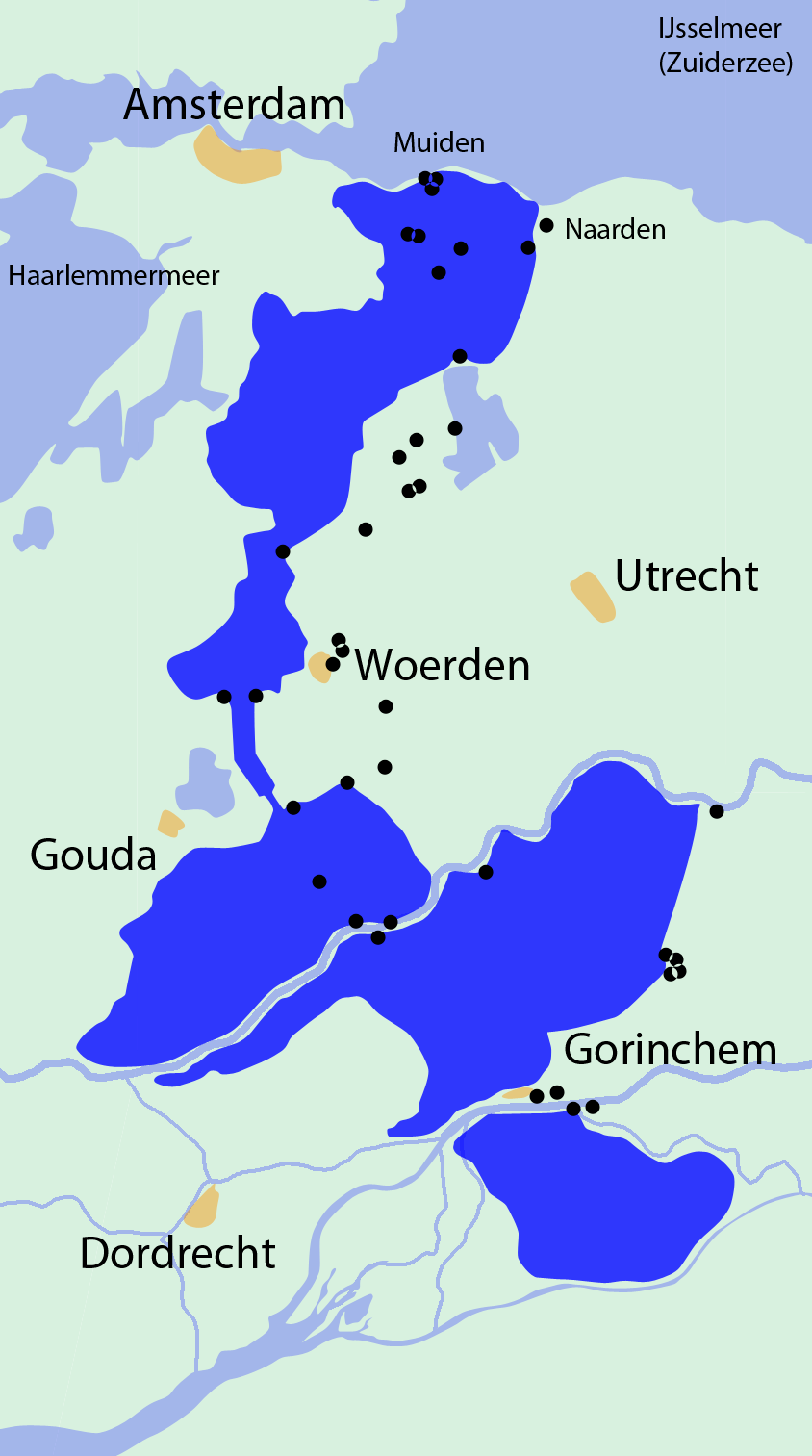
Map of the Old Waterline

Old Waterline in use in the Franco-Dutch War in 1672

In 1629, Prince Frederick Henry started the execution of the plan. Sluices were constructed in dykes and forts and fortified towns were created at strategic points along the line with guns covering the dykes that traversed the water line. The water level in the flooded areas was carefully maintained at a level deep enough to make an advance on foot precarious and shallow enough to rule out effective use of boats (other than the flat bottomed gun barges used by the Dutch defenders).

Under the water level, additional obstacles like ditches and trous de loup (and much later, barbed wire and land mines) were hidden. The trees lining the dykes that formed the only roads through the line could be turned into abatis in time of war. In wintertime the water level could be manipulated to weaken ice covering, while the ice could be used when broken up to form further obstacles that would expose advancing troops to fire from the defenders for longer.

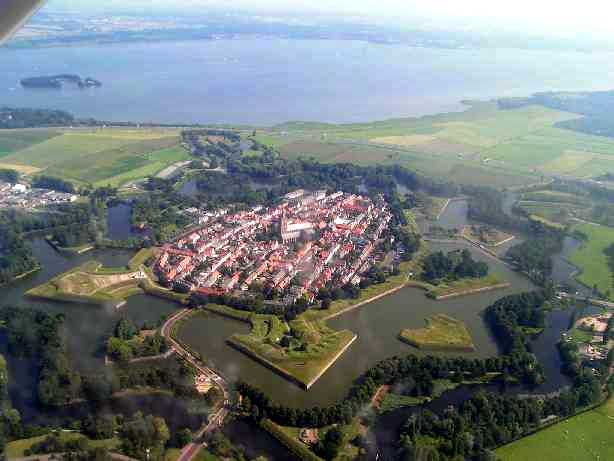
Aerial view of the fortified town of Naarden; with a good view of the star-shaped layout of the earth bastions, designed in the early gunpowder age to place outward guns to force an enemy to keep distance and thus to protect the town proper against shelling

The Dutch Waterline proved its value less than 40 years after its construction during the Franco-Dutch War (or Third Anglo-Dutch War) (1672), when it stopped the armies of Louis XIV from conquering Holland, although the freezing over of the line came close to rendering it useless. In 1794 and 1795, the revolutionary French armies overcame the obstacle posed by the Dutch Waterline only by the heavy frost that had frozen the flooded areas solid.

=== New Dutch Waterline ===
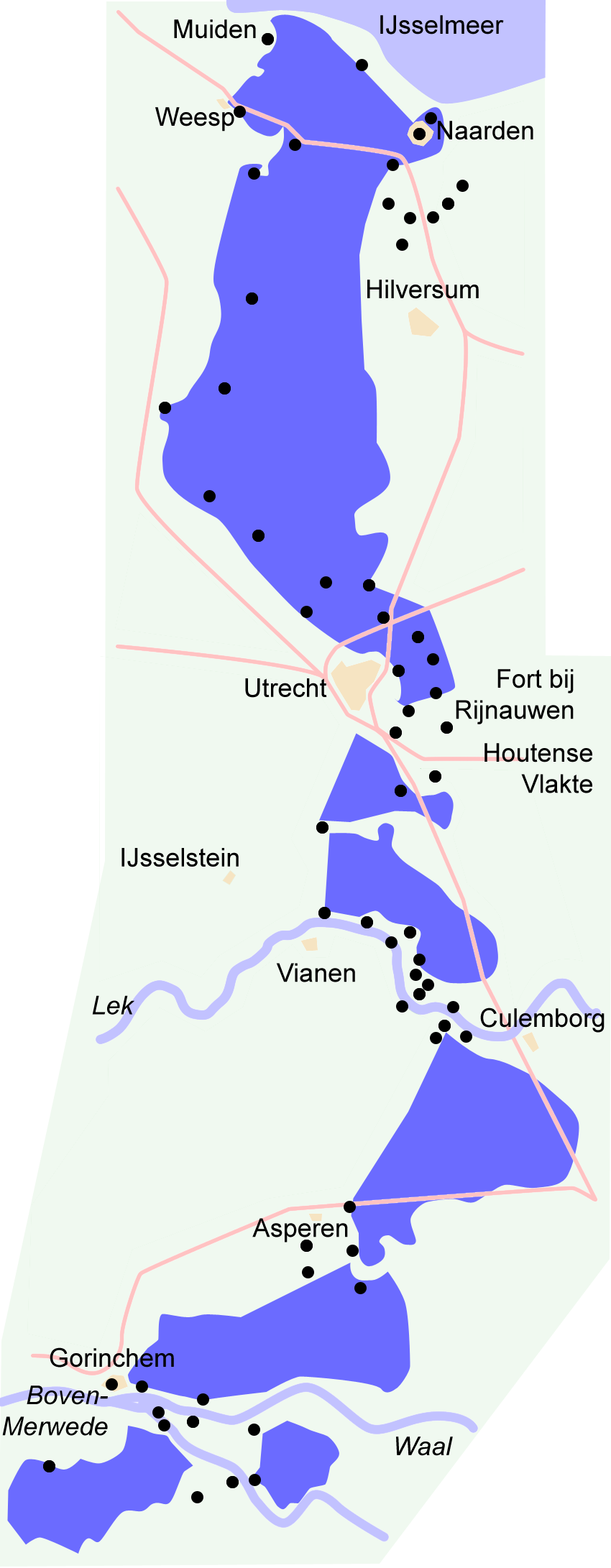
Map of the New Waterline

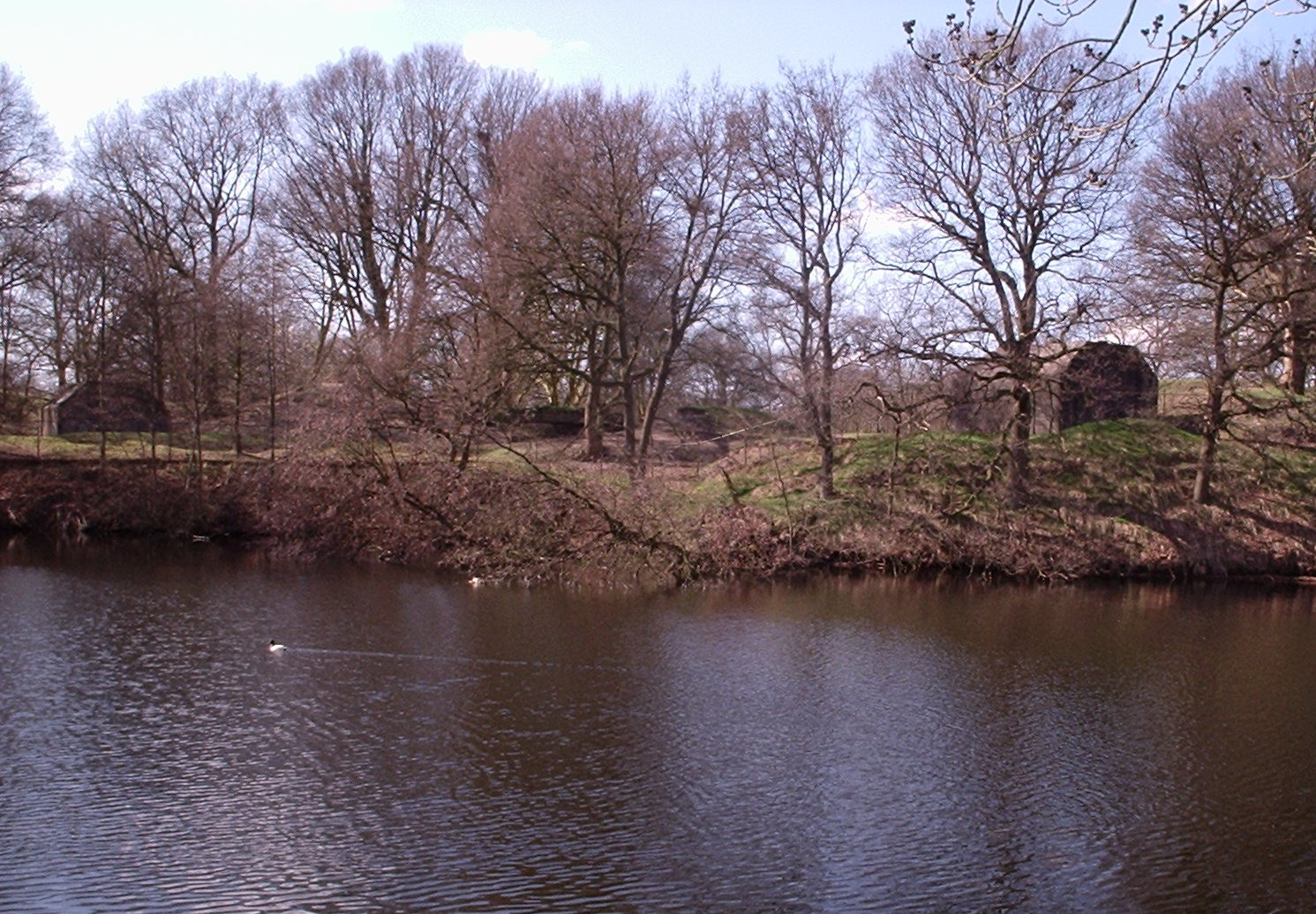
Concrete shelters at Fort Ruigenhoek

After the final defeat of Napoleon in 1815 at the Battle of Waterloo, the United Kingdom of the Netherlands was formed. King William I modernised the waterline, to include Utrecht to the east. It was further extended and modernised in the 19th century, with forts containing round gun towers reminiscent of Martello towers. The line was mobilised but never attacked during the 1870 Franco-Prussian War and during World War I.

At the advent of World War II, most of the earth and brick fortifications in were too vulnerable to modern artillery and bombs to withstand a protracted siege. To remedy this, a large number of pillboxes were added. Many of the pillboxes added were the newest Type S-3 Bunker, Type G Casemate and the River Casemates. However, the most widely deployed structure was unarmed. The Type P Shelter was the most widely deployed structure of the Dutch New Waterline, at 570 structures built. Despite the additions, Dutch had decided to use a more eastern main defence line, the Grebbe Line, and reserved a secondary role for the Waterline. During the Battle of the Grebbeberg in 1940, the Grebbe Line was broken, and the field army withdrew to the Waterline. However, modern tactics could circumvent fixed defense lines, as happened during the French Maginot Line. While the Dutch army was fighting a fixed battle at the Grebbe Line, German airborne troops captured the southern approaches into the heart of "Fortress Holland" by surprise, the key points being the bridges at Moerdijk, Dordrecht and Rotterdam. When resistance did not cease, the Germans forced the Dutch into surrender by aerial bombing of Rotterdam and threatening the same for Utrecht and Amsterdam.

After World War II, the Dutch government redesigned the idea of a waterline to counter a possible Soviet invasion. This third version of the Waterline was erected more to the east at the IJssel (the IJssel Line) and in Gelderland. In case of an invasion, the waters of the Rhine and the Waal were set to divert into the IJssel, flooding the river and bordering lands. The plan was never tested, and it was dismantled by the Dutch government in 1964. From its conception in 1815, until the last modernisation in 1940, the equivalent of around 50 billion euro was spent on the New Dutch Water Line.

==== Dimensions and units ====
Length	85 km
Width	3–5 km
Area	50,000 ha
Defensive works	60
Flood zones	10 basins

=== Present ===
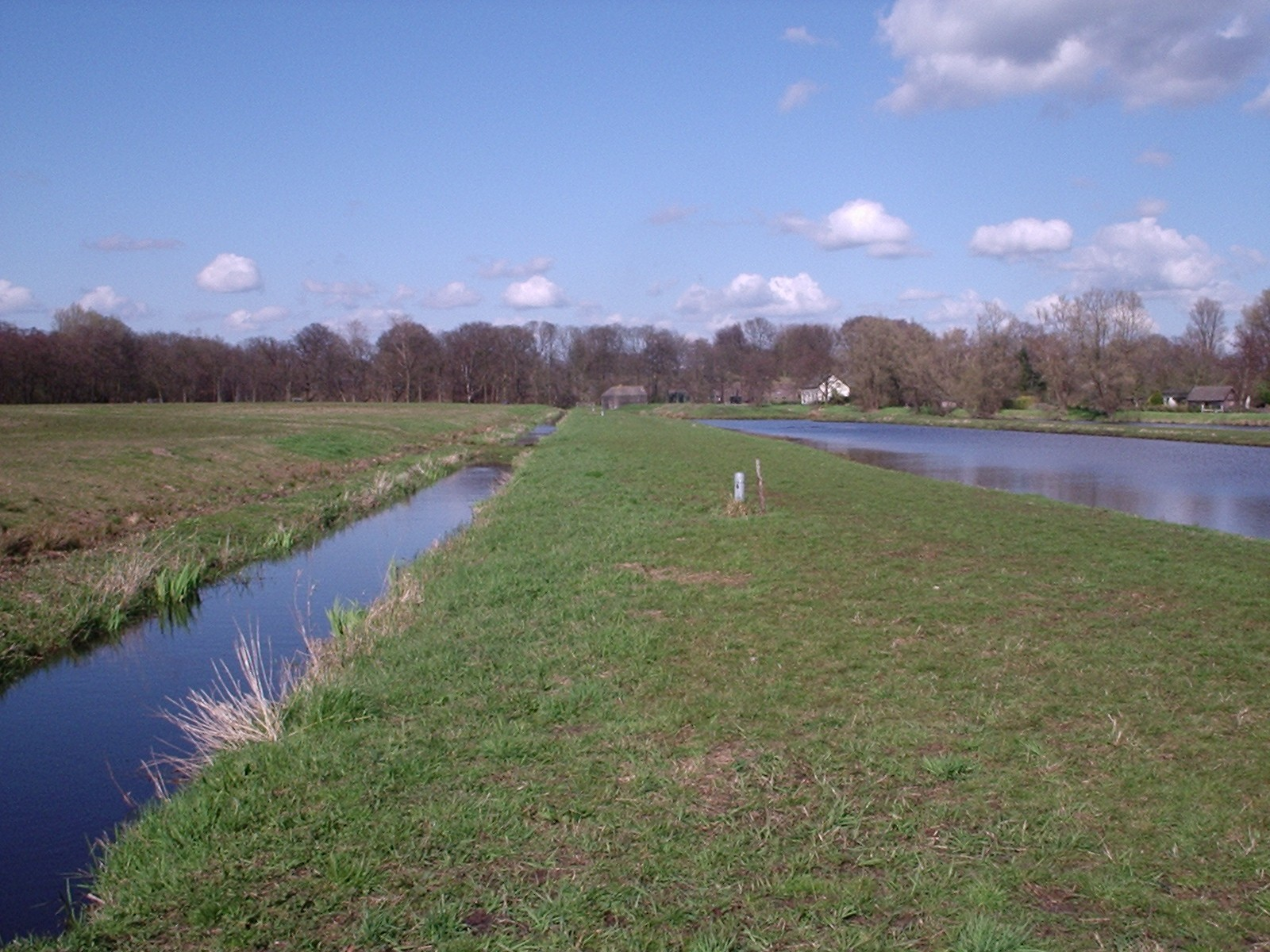
Inundation area near fort Ruigenhoek

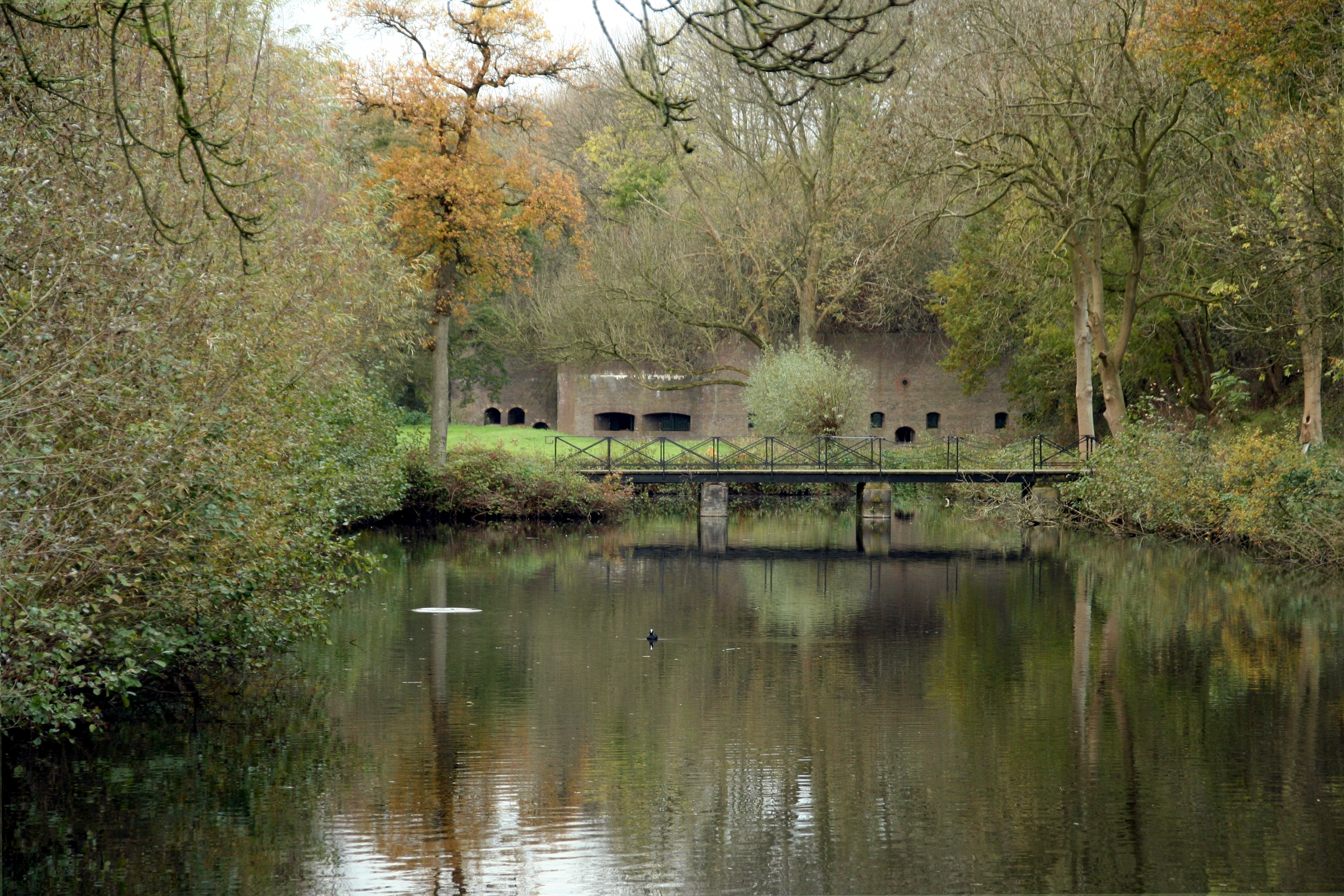
Fort Rhijnauwen view from the Vossegatsedijk

Today many of the forts are still more or less intact. There is renewed interest in the waterline for its natural beauty. Bike tours and hiking paths are organised with the line as a theme. Some of the forts are open for bikers/hikers to stay the night. Others have a variety of uses, for example Utrecht University houses a botanical garden in Fort Hoofddijk.

Due to the unique nature of the line, the Dutch government considered whether to nominate the whole defensive line as a UNESCO World Heritage Site, as they did with the ring of fortresses around Amsterdam. On July 26, 2021, the line was added as a UNESCO World Heritage Site. A 25-year plan has been developed by artist Agnes Denes.

In 2010, one of the forts on the (Line Bunker 599) was opened as a publicly accessible work of art that was created through a cooperation between RAAAF and Atelier de Lyon. The bunker was sliced open, with a walkway placed through it forming an installation allowing a view to look into and through the bunker.

== Constructions ==
=== Forts ===
To protect weaknesses in the waterline a series of forts and fortified towns have been constructed.

Order of forts following the line from north to south.

Forts explicitly built to defend a town are mentioned with the relevant town in parentheses

- Permanent battery De Westbatterij (Muiden)
- Castle Muiderslot (Muiden)
- Fortified town of Muiden
- Fortified town of Weesp
- Fort aan de Ossenmarkt (Weesp)
- Fort Uitermeer
- Fort Hinderdam
- Fort Ronduit (Naarden)
- Fortified town of Naarden
- Permanent batteries at the Karnemelksloot (Naarden)
- Fort Uitermeer
- Fort Kijkuit
- Fort Spion
- Fort Nieuwersluis
- Fort bij Tienhoven
- Fort aan de Klop (Utrecht)
- Fort de Gagel (Utrecht)
- Fort op de Ruigenhoeksedijk (Utrecht)
- Fort Blauwkapel (Utrecht)
- Fort op de Voordorpsdijk (Utrecht)
- Fort aan de Biltstraat (Utrecht)
- Fort Hoofddijk (Utrecht)
- Fort bij Rhijnauwen (Utrecht)
- Lunetten, a series of small crescent-shaped forts:

- Lunet I (Utrecht)
- Lunet II (Utrecht)
- Lunet III (Utrecht)
- Lunet IV (Utrecht)

- Fort bij Vechten (Utrecht)
- Fort bij 't Hemeltje
- Fort bij Jutphaas (Nieuwegein)
- Minor fort Werk aan de Waalse Wetering
- Minor fort Werk aan de Korte Uitweg
- Lunet aan de Snel
- Fort Honswijk
- Minor fort Werk aan de Groeneweg
- Fort Everdingen
- Minor fort Werk aan het Spoel
- Fort Pannerden
- Fort Boven Lent
- Minor fort Werk op de spoorweg bij de Diefdijk
- Fort bij Asperen
- Fort bij de Nieuwe Steeg
- Fort bij Vuren
- Fortified town of Gorinchem
- Fortified town of Woudrichem
- Castle Loevestein
- Minor fort Werk aan de Bakkerskil
- Fort Steurgat
- Fort aan de Uppelse Dijk (Fort Altena)
- Fort Giessen

=== Locks ===
- Plofsluis

== See also ==
=== Dutch waterlines ===
- Defence Line of Amsterdam
- Frisian waterline
- Maas Line
- Peel-Raam Line
- West Brabant waterline

=== Other ===
- Defence lines of the Netherlands
- List of fortifications
