= Type B Bunker =

Type of Dutch fortification

An undamaged Type B Casemate in a park somewhere in the Netherlands.

The Type B bunker is a Dutch type of fortification dating from between the world wars. This type of bunker is rarer than the Type G or S-3 Bunker.

== Characteristics ==
A side view of the previous bunker,

The design for the Type B bunker was finalized in June 1939. The position was like an Type S-3, but was meant explicitly for flanking fire. There was only a few differences, 1 was that the bunker was designed with only 1 casemate instead of the regular 3 of an S-3 type. The walls were also thicker with the sidewalls being 1.25m thick and the roof being 1m thick. The embrasure could be placed on the left, right, or center of the bunker. The changing of where the embrasure was helped the bunker not be weak to frontal fire like the S-3 bunkers. The bunkers were armed with a Lewis heavy machine gun in the singular casemate. The crew was only 3 men, 1 gunner, 1 reloader, and 1 spotter. The casemates were speedily constructed along the southern and eastern defensive lines.

== Deployment ==
The bunkers were sited behind the main defensive lines at crucial road junctions to stop infiltrating infantry. Most bunkers were directly behind the main bunkers so that when infantry broke through, they could be eliminated quickly. Overall, 214 Type B bunkers were constructed between 1939-40.

- IJssel Line: 144 Type B bunkers
- Peel-Raam Line: 46 Type B bunkers
- Grebbe Line: 18 Type B bunkers
- 6 bunkers scattered around the Netherlands.

== Combat ==
During the Battle of Mill, a Type B casemate helped derail and pin down a German train and the troops after it was evacuated. The bunker was sited overlooking the Peel canal and railway tracks, and was thus able to spray the most important location in the area with heavy machine gun fire.

A Type B Bunker in a farmers field today

During Operation Market Garden in 1944, a specialized type of B bunker called B-270 engaged American paratroopers who landed on top of the bunker. The bunker guarded the Grave Bridge (John S. Thompson Bridge). The Germans inside fought fiercely until they were eliminated by bazooka-armed paratroopers.

== Post-war ==
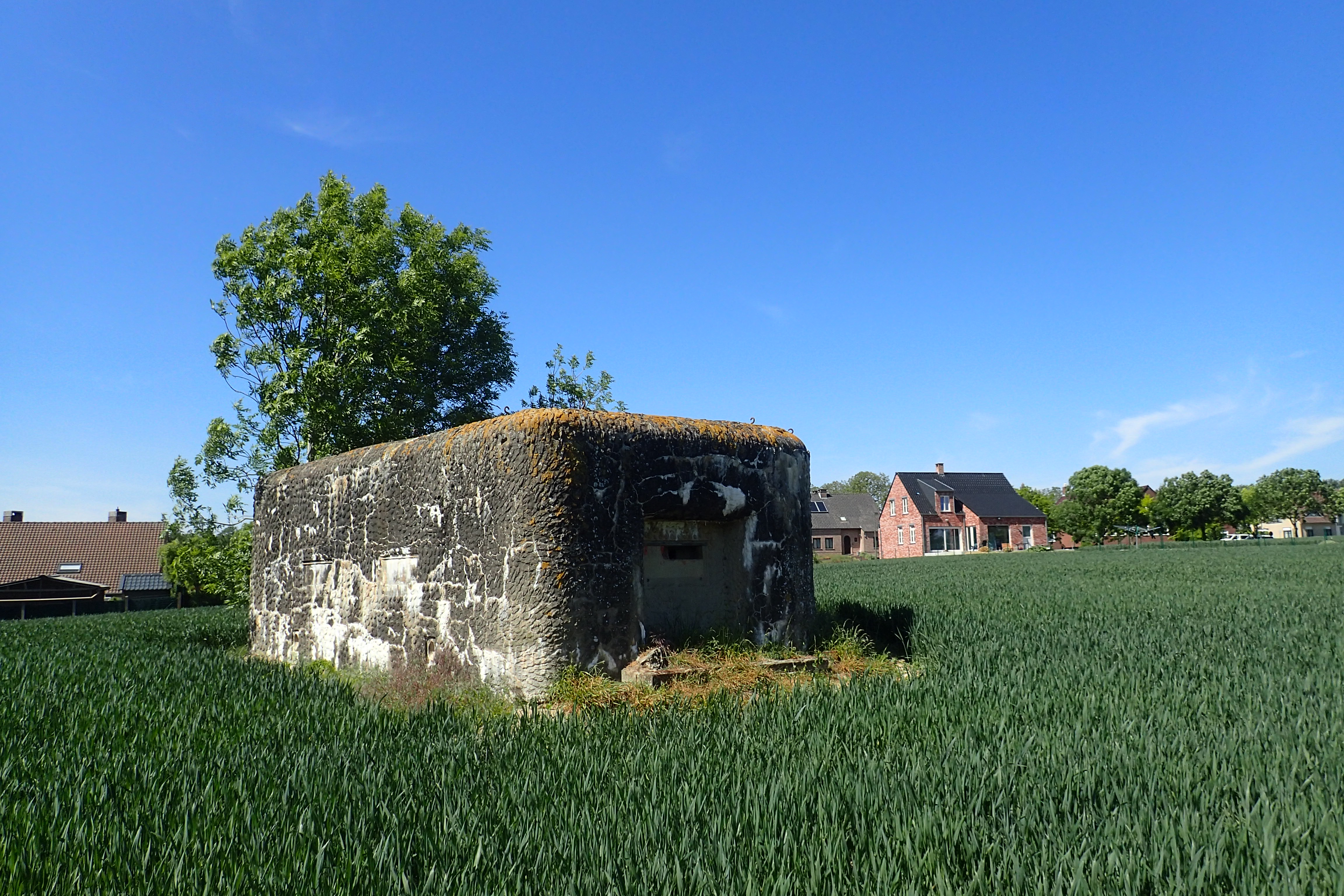
A Type B bunker in a corn field near Kesteren.

Unlike the mass produced S-3 and Type G bunkers, many Type B bunkers remain today. 13 of the original 18 bunkers of the Grebbe Line remain. It is not detailed how many exact bunkers remain from the Peel-Raam Line, but sources indicate a high preservation rate. However, the Peel-Raam Line's Type B bunkers were mostly demolished during and after the war. Recently, the remains of a Type B bunker were found near the town of De Spees.
