= Stelling van Amsterdam =

Fortification line in the Netherlands

- Netherlands
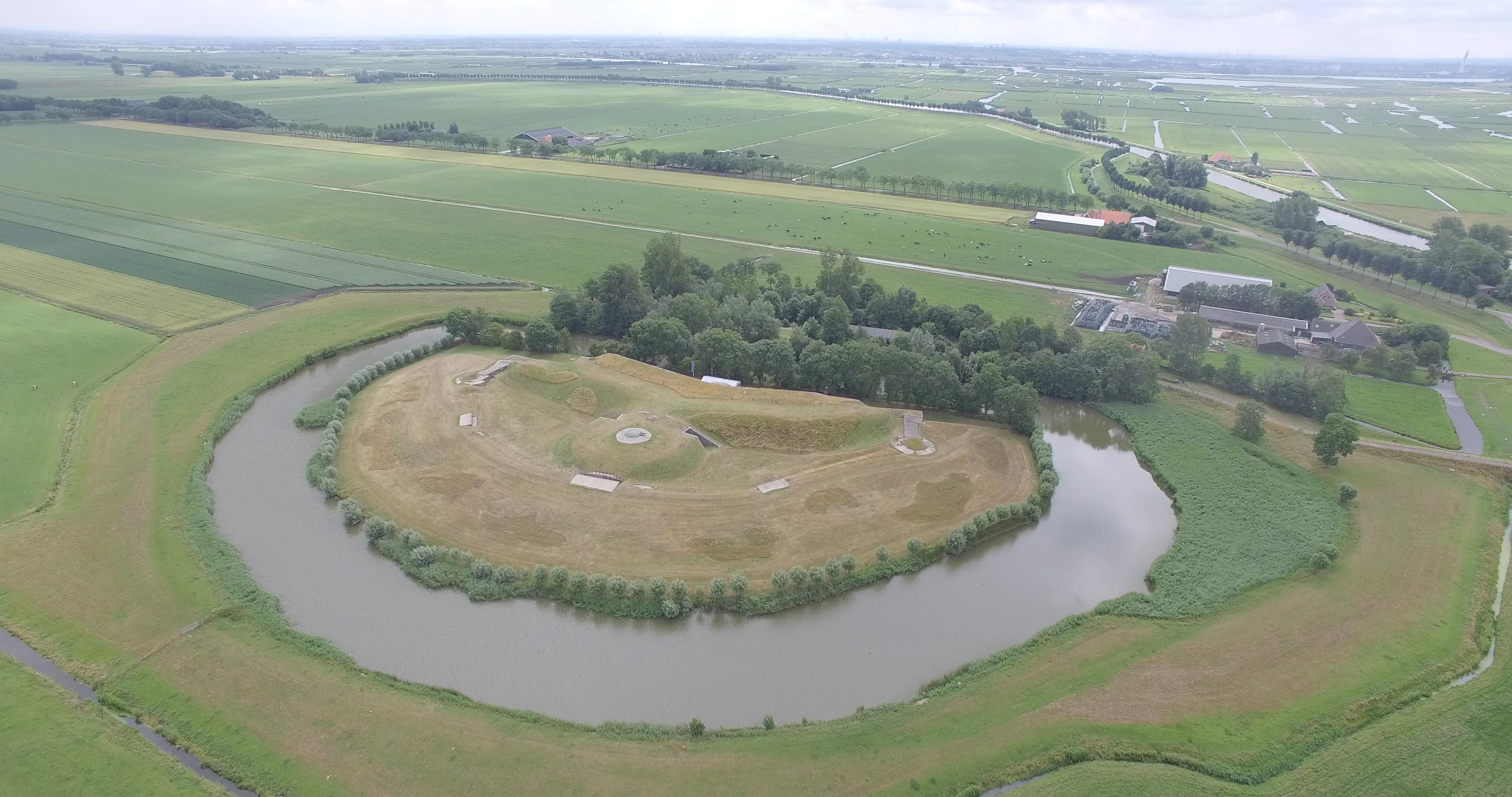
- Fort bij Spijkerboor (in 2015)

Site information
- Website: Official website

Location

UNESCO World Heritage Site
- Official name: Dutch Water Defence Lines
- Location: North Holland, Utrecht, Netherlands
- Criteria: Cultural: (ii), (iv), (v)
- Reference: 759bis
- Inscription: 1996 (20th Session)
- Extensions: 2021

The Stelling van Amsterdam (pronounced [ˈstɛlɪŋ vɑn ˌɑmstərˈdɑm]; "Defence Line of Amsterdam") is a 135-kilometre (84 mi) fortification line around Amsterdam, which would function as a national redoubt. It comprises 45 forts, as well as dams, dikes, locks, pumping stations, batteries and casemates. The forts are 10–15 kilometres (6.2–9.3 mi) from the centre and lowlands, which can easily be inundated in time of war. The inundation was designed to give a depth of about 30 centimetres (12 in), too little for boats to cross. Any buildings within 1 kilometre (0.62 mi) of the line had to be made of wood so that they could be burnt and the obstruction removed.

The Stelling van Amsterdam was constructed between 1880 and 1920. The Stelling was mobilised and partially inundated during the First World War, but the Netherlands remained neutral and was not invaded. In 1922, the Stelling became part of the Fortress Holland. The north side of the Stelling was inundated when Germany invaded in 1940 at the start of the Second World War, but the Netherlands capitulated before the Germans reached the Stelling.

It is part of the UNESCO World Heritage Site Dutch Water Defence Lines.

== Background ==
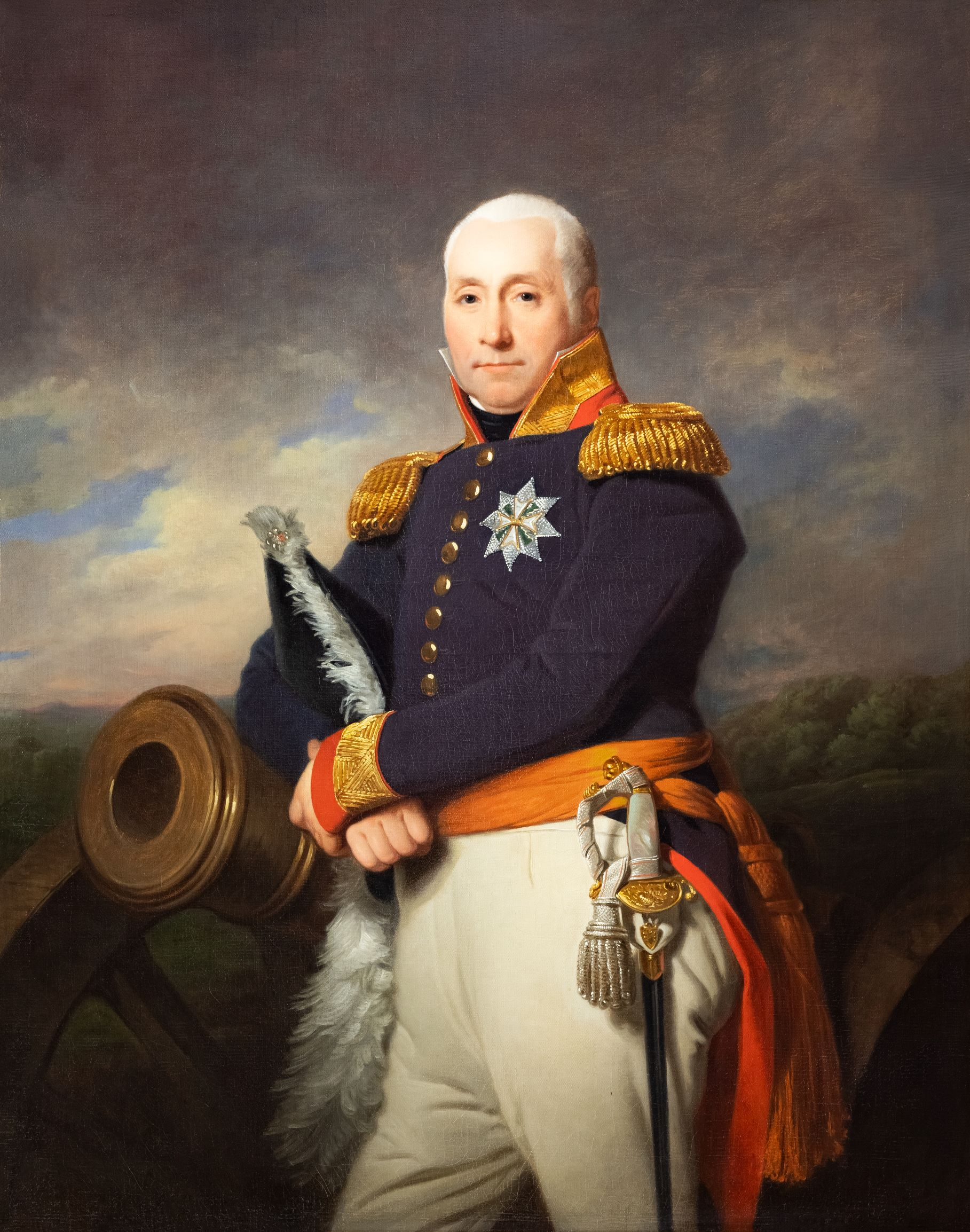
Engineer Cornelis Krayenhoff was involved in all defence lines around Amsterdam since 1787, in particular the Posts of Krayenhoff named after him.

A combination of inundation and posts to protect Amsterdam date back as far as 1629, when these were prepared against a planned but later cancelled attack from the south by the Spanish general Ernesto Montecuccoli during the Eighty Years' War. Another water defence line was prepared in the south in 1672, the Rampjaar, but the invaders failed to get past the Old Dutch Waterline. In June 1787, 27 posts were created by the Patriots and on 18 September 1787, the surrounding polders were inundated. These posts held back the Prussian invasion, but the Prussians managed to get access through the Haarlemmermeer and successfully attacked the posts from behind.

When the English invaded Holland in 1799, a water defence line was created north of Amsterdam, led by engineer Cornelis Krayenhoff. In 1800, the Line of Beverwijk was created led by Krayenhoff to the west of Amsterdam, fearing another invasion by England. When the threat had decreased the next year, the posts were neglected. In 1805, Krayenhoff was tasked with creating a new defence line, because King Louis Bonaparte feared annexation by the First French Empire. The posts would be built in 1809 and 1810 at a distance of 8-12 km from the city, and would become known as the Posts of Krayenhoff. The Incorporation of the Netherlands in 1810 was peaceful, so the posts were not used. Plans were made to improve the posts, but they were never executed because of the liberation of the Netherlands in 1813. In the following decades, new forts would be added to the Posts of Krayenhoff in the poldered Haarlemmermeer: Fort near Heemstede, Fort along Schiphol, Fort along the Liede, Fort along the Nieuwe Meer.

== Function ==
The Stelling van Amsterdam was primarily a defensive water line (Dutch: waterlinie). In the event of an enemy attack, large tracts of land around Amsterdam would be inundated with water, preventing the enemy from advancing. Amsterdam would function as a national redoubt or reduit, as the last stronghold of the Netherlands. Forts were built in which roads, railways or dikes crossed through the water line. At such locations, there would be no water to stop the enemy and so the forts were intended to shell the enemy.

== Construction ==
The law for the construction of the Stelling van Amsterdam was passed in 1874, a few years after the Unification of Germany, which placed a powerful new great power on the eastern border of the Netherlands. During the planning prior to its construction, the design was already obviously outdated by modern technical advances. The invention of the high-explosive shell and the percussion fuze, which allowed ordnance to explode on impact and dislodge brick fortifications easily, necessitated a change from masonry to concrete forts. The Dutch did not have the required experience yet using and building with concrete and so extensive tests had to be performed. Concrete structures were shelled with the heaviest artillery available at that time. Further delays resulted from the fact that the sand foundations had to settle for several years before the forts could be built on them. Only in 1897 could the actual construction finally begin.

== Service ==
The Stelling van Amsterdam has never seen combat service and the use of aircraft rendered it obsolete after World War I. It was, however, maintained and kept in service until it was decommissioned in 1963.

The dike through the Haarlemmermeer, which made it possible to inundate the southern portion of the polder while the northern portion could continue to produce food for Amsterdam, is now cut by the A4 motorway. The motorway also goes under the Ringvaart at Roelofarendsveen, which makes the inundation of the Haarlemmermeer Polder and thus the future use of the Stelling no longer possible.

In 1996, the complete Stelling was designated as a UNESCO World Heritage Site, which was extended in 2021 with the New Dutch Waterline to form the Dutch Water Defence Lines.

== Fortifications ==
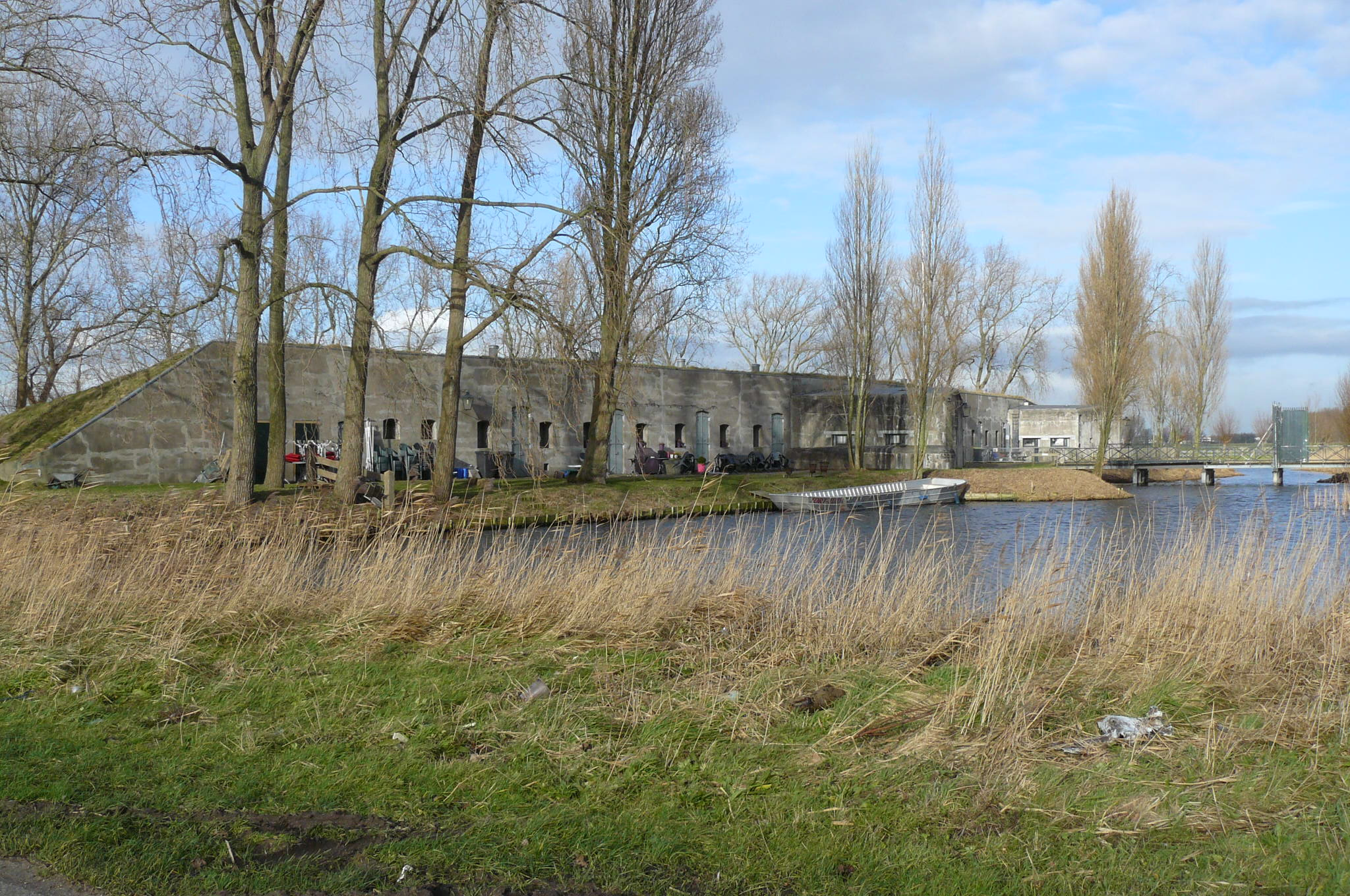
Fort south of Spaarndam.

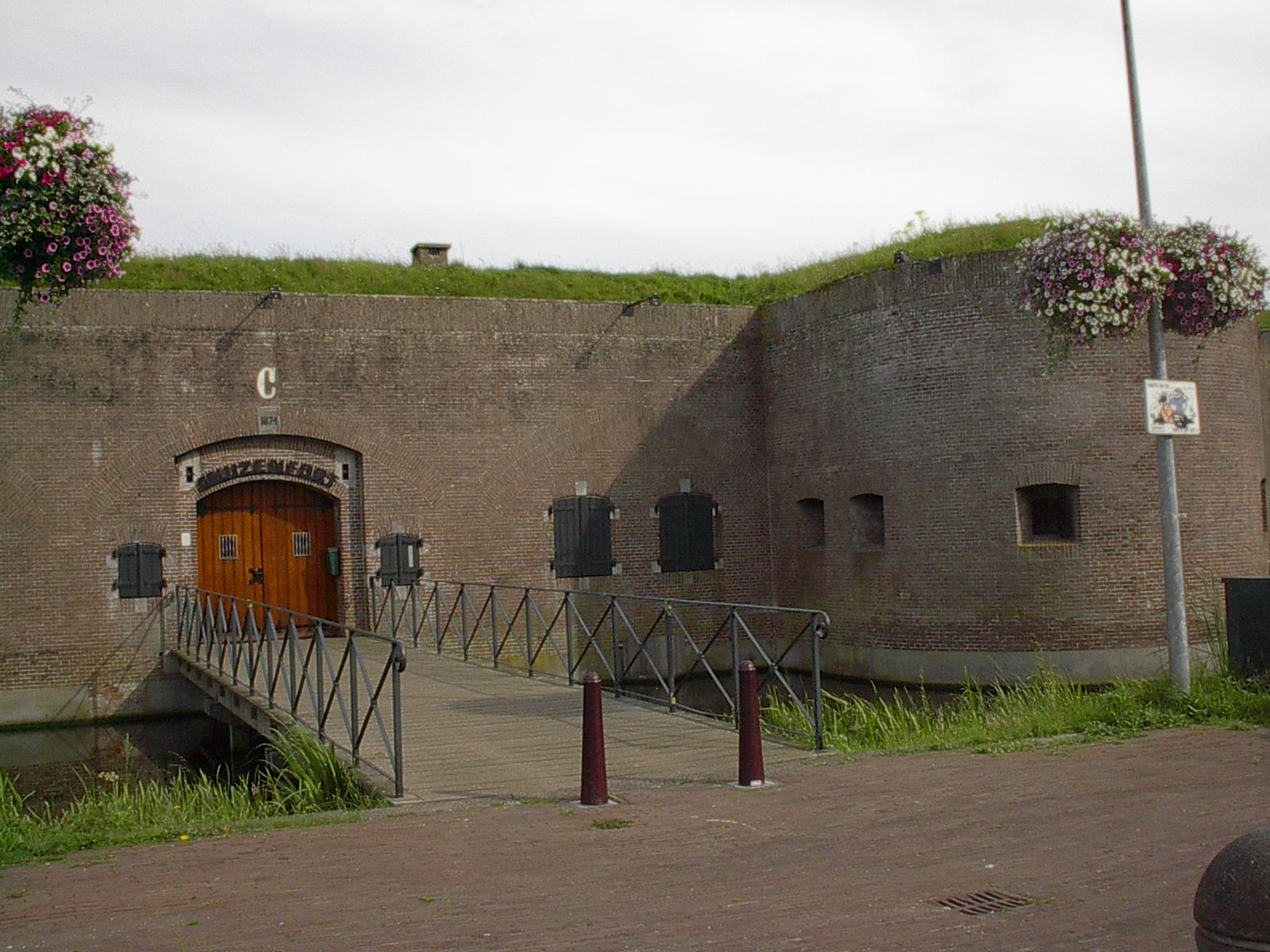
Muizenfort in Muiden.

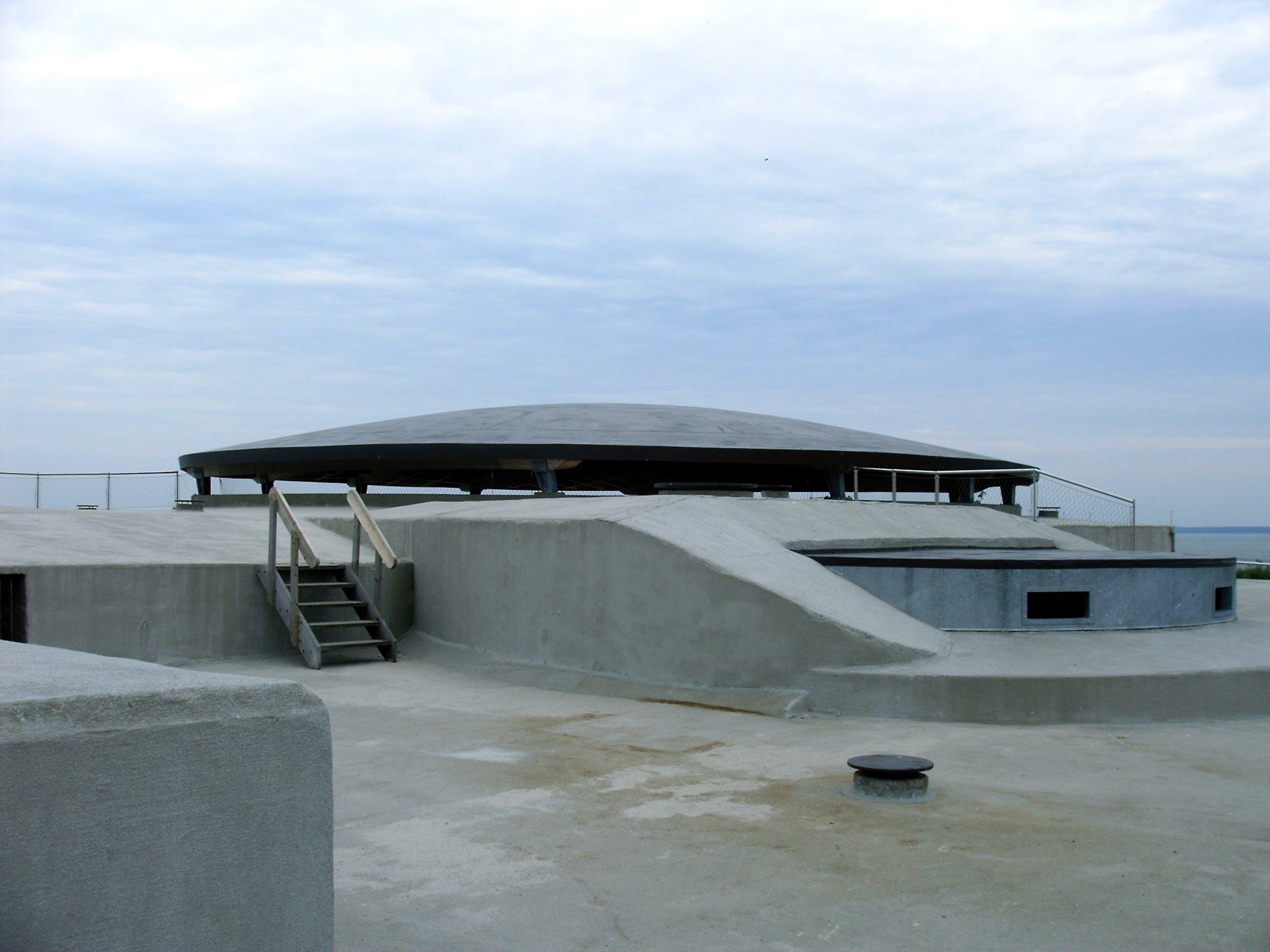
Fortifications on Pampus island.

List of fortications
Fortification	Group	Sector	Model
Fort near Edam	Edam	Ilpendam	B
Fort near Kwadijk	Purmerend	Ilpendam	
Fort North of Purmerend	Purmerend	Ilpendam	B
Fort along Nekkerweg	Purmerend	Ilpendam	B
Fort along Middenweg	Purmerend	Ilpendam	C
Fort along Jisperweg	Purmerend	Ilpendam	C
Fort near Spijkerboor	Wormerveer	Zaandam	B
Fort near Marken-Binnen	Wormerveer	Zaandam	A
Fort near Krommeniedijk	Wormerveer	Zaandam	A
Fort along Den Ham	Wormerveer	Zaandam	A
Fort near Veldhuis	Westzaan	Zaandam	A
Fort along the St. Aagtendijk	Westzaan	Zaandam	A
Fort in the Zuidwijkermeerpolder	Westzaan	Zaandam	A
Fort near Velsen	Westzaan	Zaandam	A
Coastal Fort near IJmuiden	Westzaan	Zaandam	
Fort North of Spaarndam	Halfweg	Sloten	A
Fort South of Spaarndam	Halfweg	Sloten	A
Fort near Penningsveer	Halfweg	Sloten	A
Fort near the Liebrug	Halfweg	Sloten	A
Fort along the Liede	Halfweg	Sloten	
Fort near Vijfhuizen	Halfweg	Sloten	A
Fort near Heemstede	Halfweg	Sloten	
Battery along IJweg	Schiphol	Sloten	
Fort near Hoofddorp	Schiphol	Sloten	A
Battery along Sloterweg	Schiphol	Sloten	
Fort near Aalsmeer	Schiphol	Sloten	A
Fort near Kudelstaart	Schiphol	Sloten	A
Fort near De Kwakel	De Nes	Ouderkerk	A
Fort along the Drecht	De Nes	Ouderkerk	B
Fort near Uithoorn	De Nes	Ouderkerk	B
Fort Waver-Amstel	De Nes	Ouderkerk	B
Fort in the Botshol	De Nes	Ouderkerk	
Fort along the Winkel	Abcoude	Ouderkerk	
Fort near Abcoude	Abcoude	Ouderkerk	
Batteries along the Gein	Abcoude	Ouderkerk	
Fort near Nigtevecht	Abcoude	Ouderkerk	A
Weesp Fortress	Diemerbrug	Ouderkerk	
Muiden Fortress	Diemerbrug	Ouderkerk	
Battery near Diemerdam	Diemerbrug	Ouderkerk	
Fort Pampus	Diemerbrug	Ouderkerk	
Battery near Durgerdam (Vuurtoreneiland)	Diemerbrug	Ouderkerk	
Fort near Hinderdam			
Fort Uitermeer			

=== Locks ===
- Inundation lock southern Beemsterringdijk (Dutch: Inundatiesluis zuidelijke Beemsterringdijk)

=== Barracks ===
- Amsterdam Cavalry Barracks
- Oranje-Nassau Kazerne

=== Other ===
- Ammunition complex De 1800 Roeden
- Old Mill (Ouderkerk on the Amstel)
- Stone Silo

== See also ==
=== Dutch waterlines ===
- Old / New Dutch Waterline
- Grebbe line
- IJssel Line
- Maas Line
- Peel-Raam Line

=== Other ===
- Defence lines of the Netherlands
