= Muiden Fortress =

Coordinates: 52.329444°N 5.072222°E

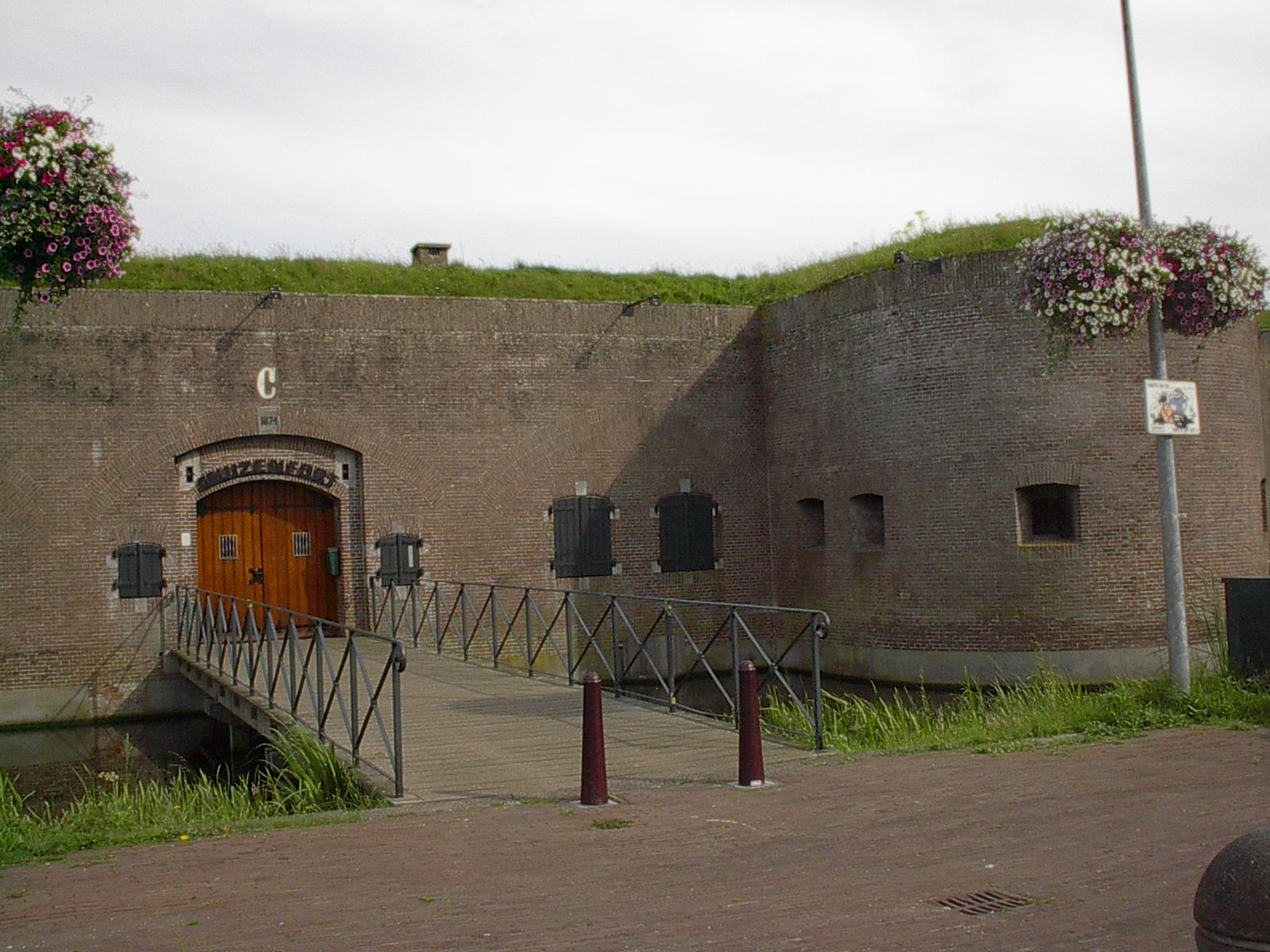
Mouse Fort

Mouse Fort (Dutch: Muizenfort) is a Dutch fort in Muiden. The fort is part of the Stelling van Amsterdam, the UNESCO World Heritage site that consists of a set of forts around the city of Amsterdam.

The fort is made of masonry and covered with sand on the east side. The fort has nine casemates, of which the two artillery casemates with three embrasures each, are the most important. From here, the bridges, dike, and channel could be attacked. The Fort also has the crew quarters, the room for the guard, the kitchen, the room for officers, the rooms for storing food, gunpowder, and the guns.
