= Fort aan den Ham =

Fort in the Netherlands

Coordinates: 52.501944°N 4.735278°E

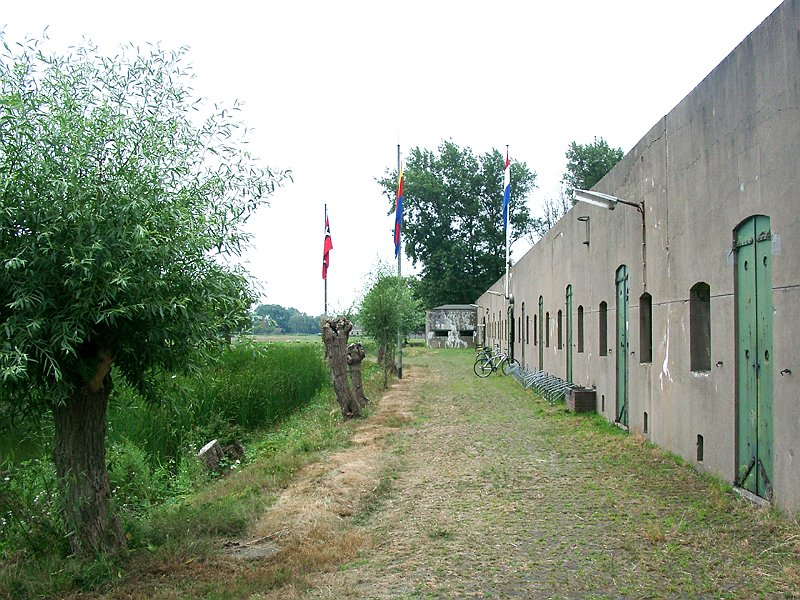
Fort aan den Ham

The Fort along Den Ham is a fort that is part of the UNESCO World Heritage site of the Stelling van Amsterdam. It's located along the railroad from Uitgeest to Krommenie. The earthen walls date from 1896, the fort itself was finished in 1903.

The fort was only used very briefly, during the First World War.
