= Fort near De Kwakel =

Fort located in De Kwakel village, Netherlands

Coordinates: 52.236944°N 4.789722°E

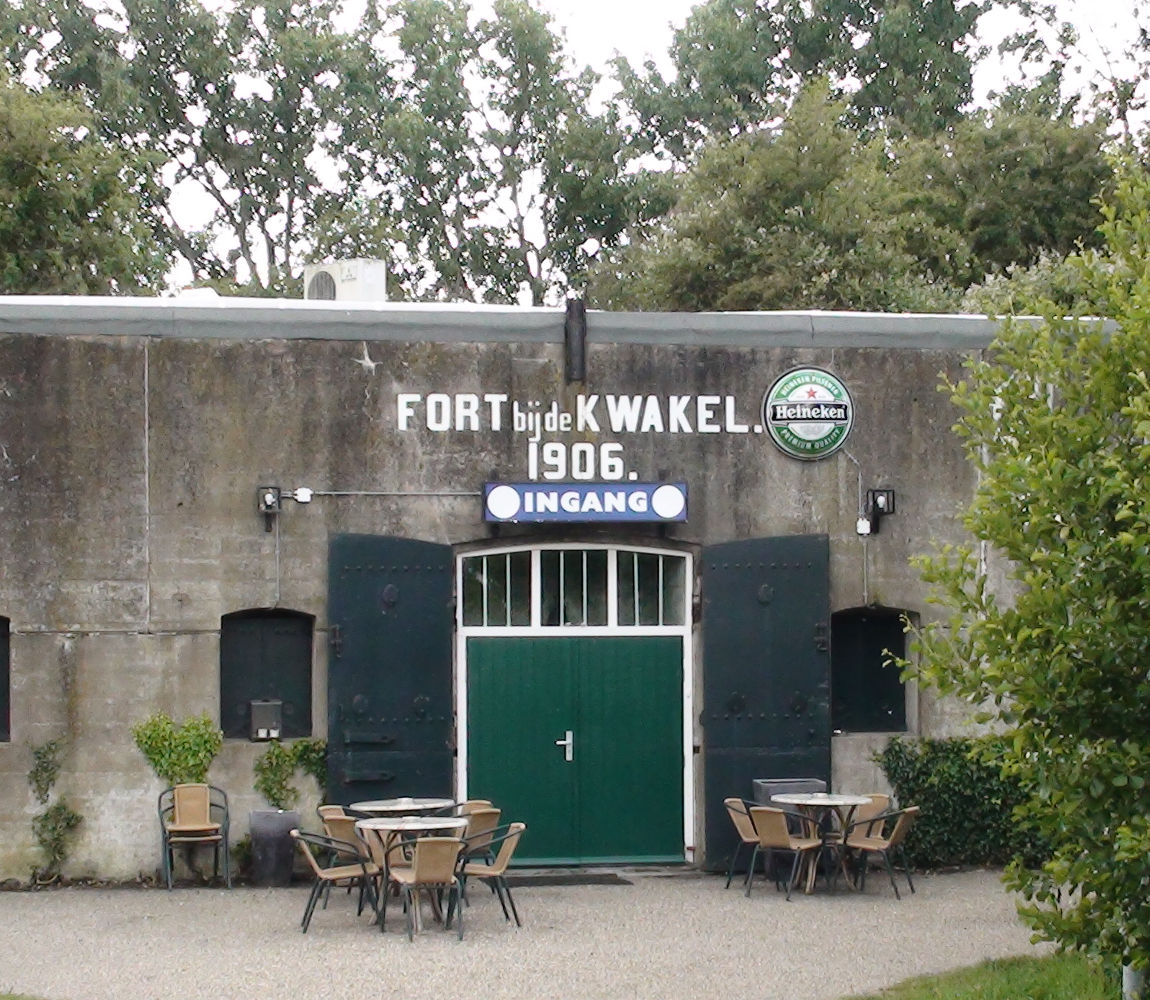
Entrance of the fort

The Fort bij De Kwakel is a fort that is part of the Stelling van Amsterdam. It's located in the village of De Kwakel. It's one of four forts that form the linie Kudelstaart - Uithoorn. To the west is fort bij Kudelstaart, to the east is fort aan de Drecht and fort bij Uithoorn.

The fort was built in 1890. The main building consists of 18 rooms. The house of the person who occupied the fort when there were no troops present is also still there. Some of the other buildings have been converted into houses.

== Gallery ==
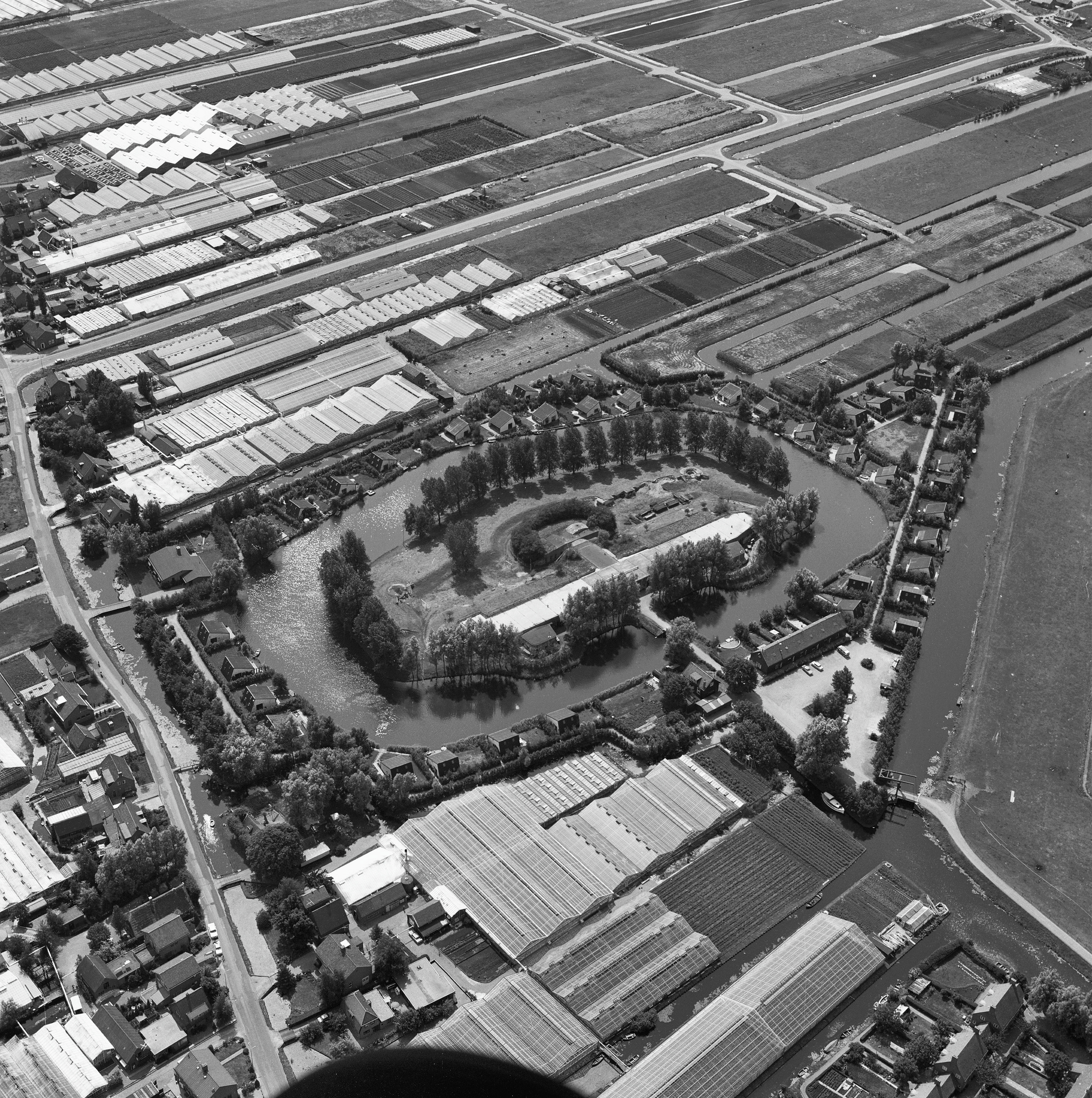
Fort from the air in 1977

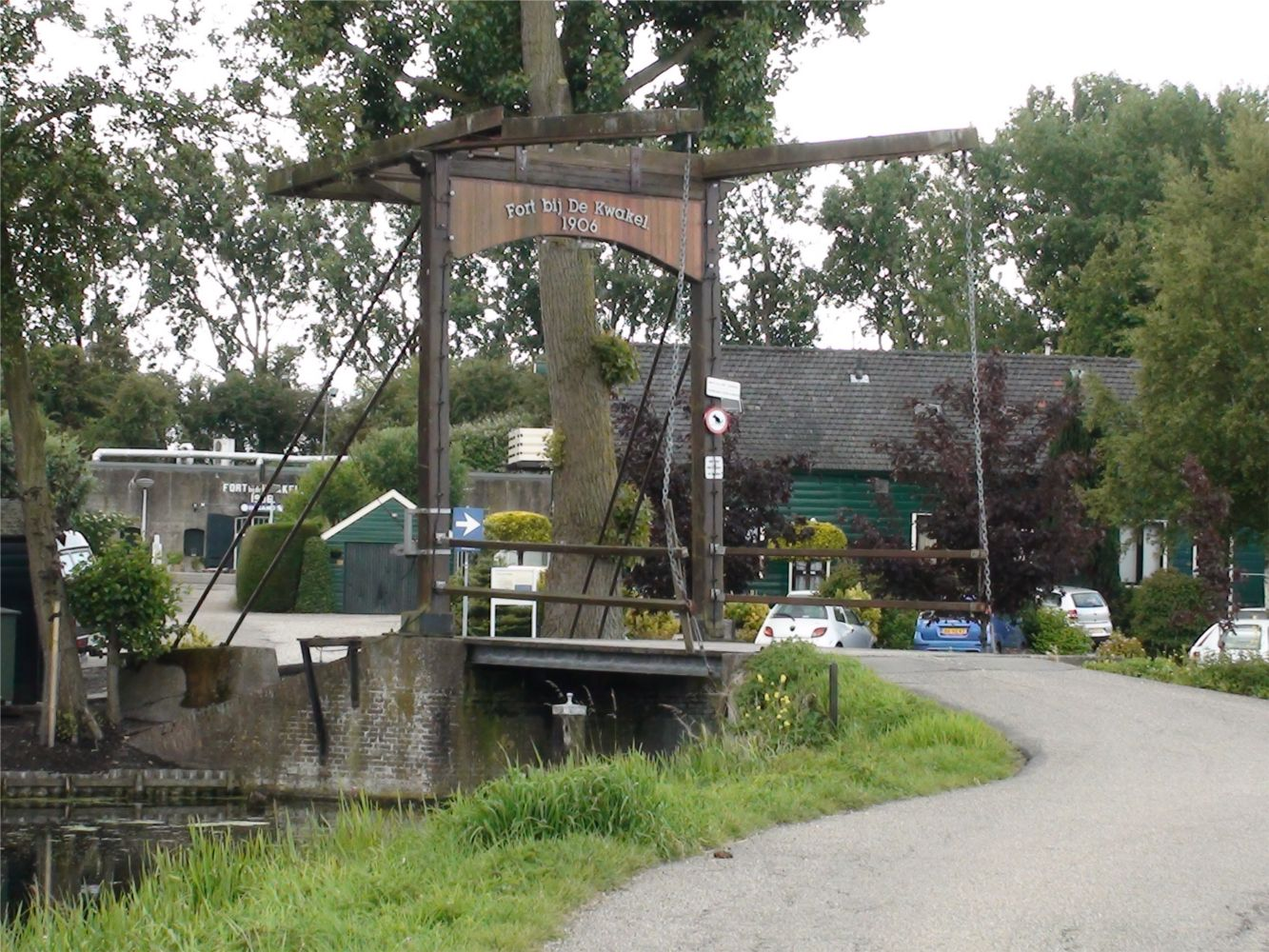
Bridge to Fort at De Kwakel and the green engineering shed

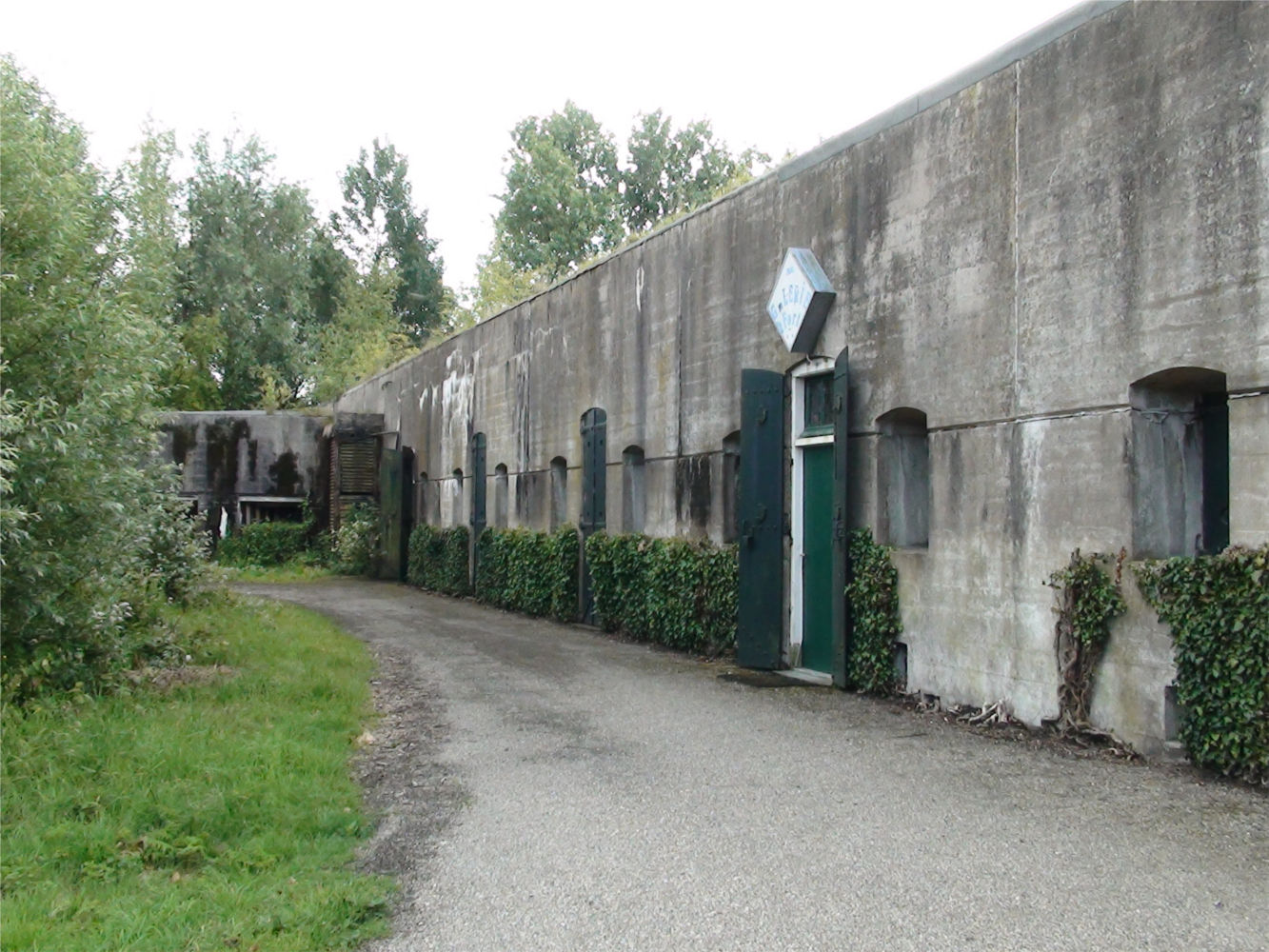
Left side of the fort

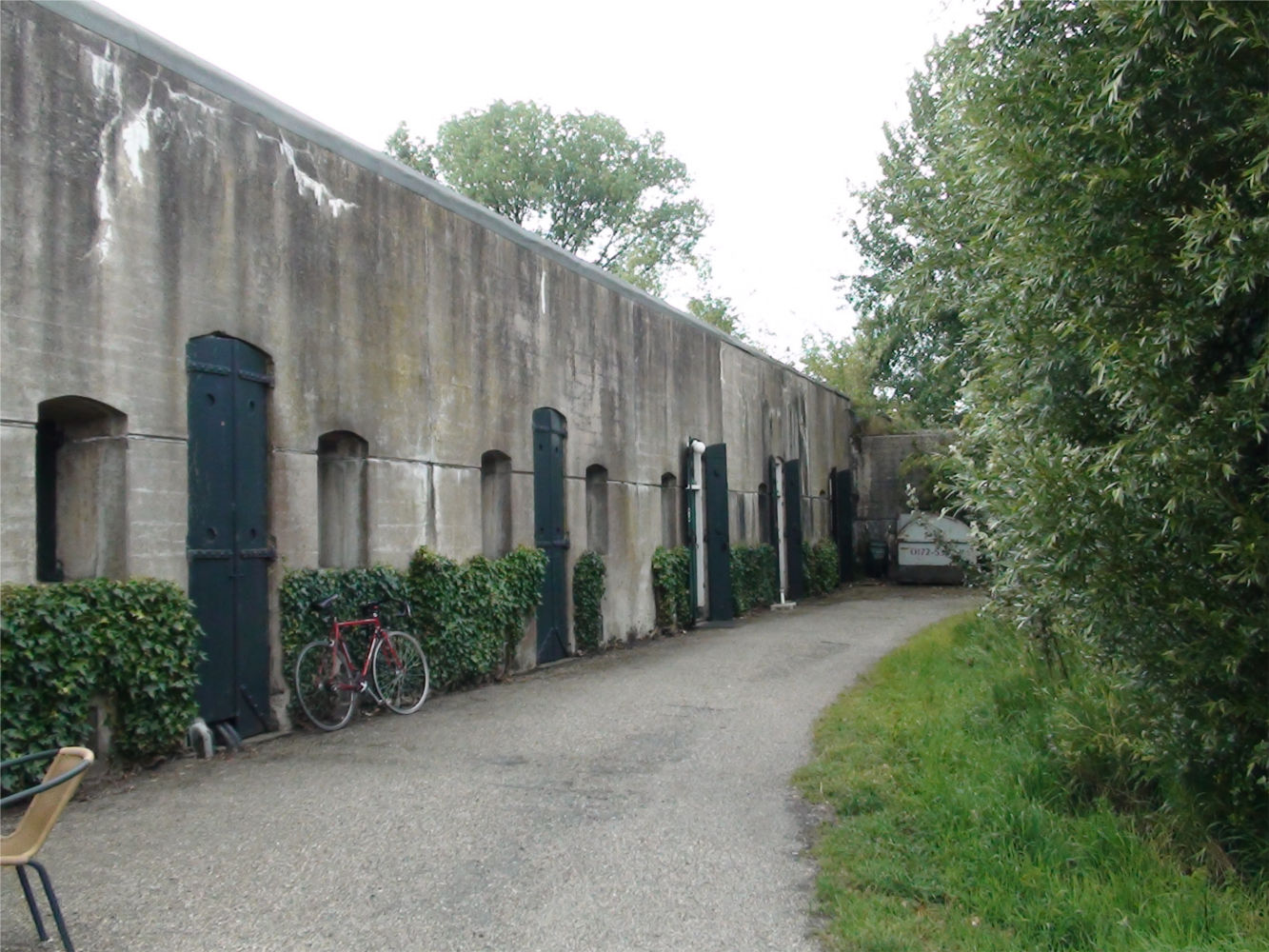
Right side of the fort

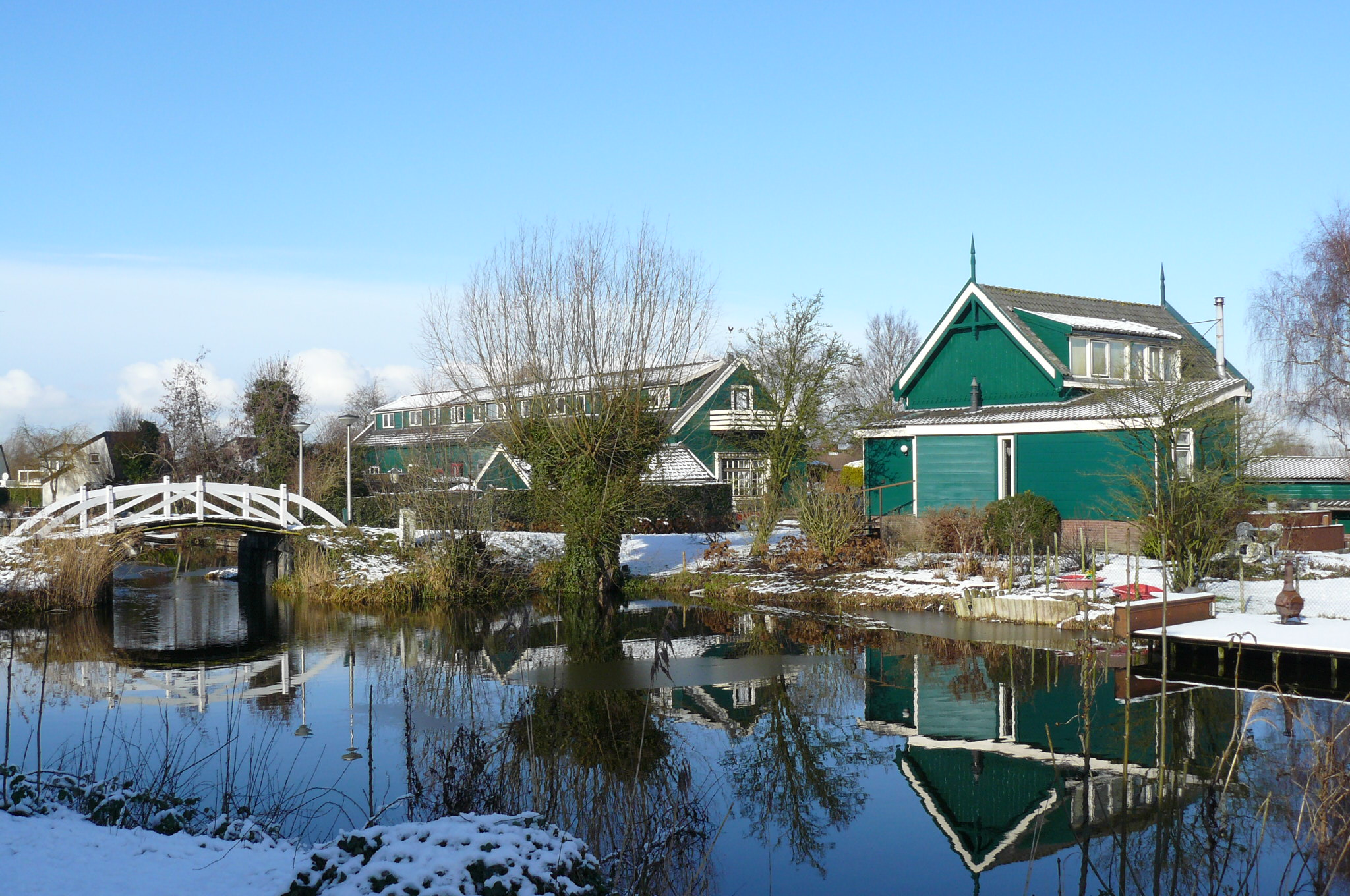
Engineer shed and fort keeper's house
