= Type P Shelter =

Type of Dutch combat shelter

An overgrown Type P Shelter in someone's garden.

The Type P bunker is a Dutch type of fortification dating from between the world wars. The bunker is commonly called “pyramids” due to their pyramid shaped roofs.

== Characteristics ==
A derelict Type P Shelter. the numerous metal hooks were for attaching camouflage.

Unlike other Dutch bunkers/casemates, the Type P was not armed and was strictly for garrisoning troops. The design was adopted in Oct. 1939 and widely deployed around the Netherlands. Each bunker follows the same design of 7.2 (L) x 5.7 (W) x 4.64 (H) meters. The bunker type gets its name from the pyramid-shaped roof. The roof was built that way to deflect 12cm, 15cm shells, grenades, and aircraft bombs. The bunker was constructed to be able to resist heaviest common batteries in the German Army, who the Dutch assumed would be their main adversary. The walls were 1.2m thick and the roof was 2.1m thick, helping to protect the troops inside. The bunker could house between 10-12 infantry comfortably. Strangely enough, the entrance to the bunker is located 1m off the ground. The bunker would be surrounded by trenches, 1 machine gun, and an anti-tank gun. Within the bunker you would enter through a steel door into a waiting room that was watched via a small-arms embrasure. The bunkers came in 2 different troop accommodation sizes 8 and 12 men. Sometimes the troop shelters were arranged right next to each other. Very rarely, 2 troop quarters would be fused together to create room for 16 men.

== Deployment ==
772 Type P bunkers were built, and were located along the southern and eastern borders.

Dutch New Waterline: 570 structures built. It was the most widely deployed structure in the Dutch New Waterline.

The other 202 shelters were located along the Belgian border or the Maastricht Appendage.

== Post-war ==
A Type P Shelter being used as a shed.

After the war, the bunkers were retired as new weapons made the bunkers obsolete. Despite their abandonment after the war, more than 500 still exist. Most are abandoned, but some have been turned into museums.
