= Fort North of Purmerend =

Fort in the Netherlands

- Fort benoorden Purmerend
- Part of Stelling van Amsterdam
- Near Purmerend in the Netherlands
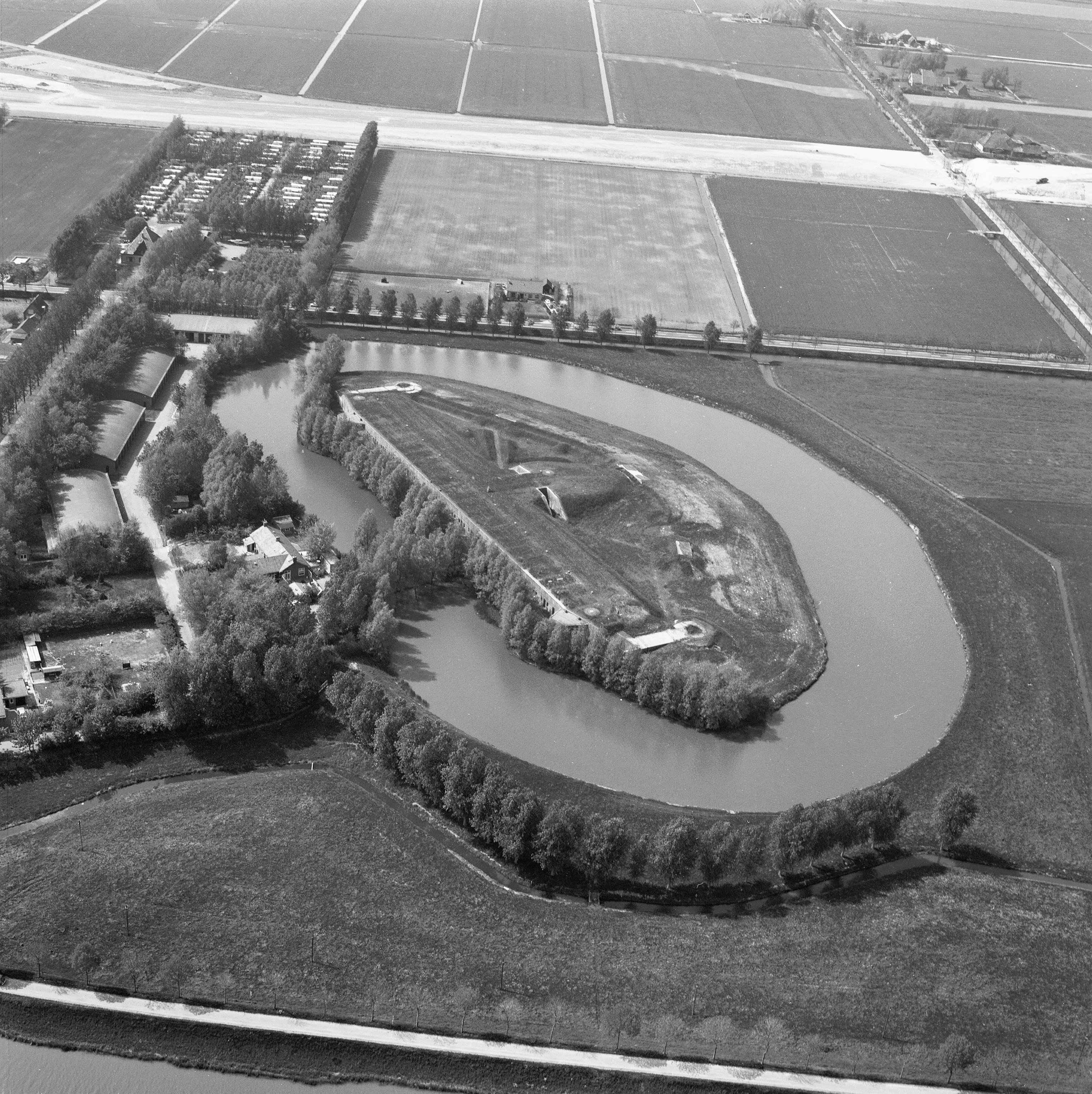
- Aerial photo of the fort in 1977

Location
- Coordinates: 52°32′9″N 4°57′27″E

Site history
- Built: 1912

Fort North of Purmerend (Dutch: Fort benoorden Purmerend) is a fort in the Netherlands that is part of the Stelling van Amsterdam. It lies in the Beemster polder, near the city of Purmerend. It was built to protect the Beemster canal ring dyke (Dutch: Beemsterringdijk), the Purmerender road (Dutch: Purmerenderweg) and the Rijper road (Dutch: Rijperweg), which were elevated and would not be affected by the flooding.

== History ==
The fort was built relatively late compared to other forts of the Stelling van Amsterdam. Its earthen walls were completed in 1885, while the fort buildings were built between 1909 and 1912.

After the first World War, it was partially transformed into an ammunition depot. After the second World War, for a short time around 300 collaborators were detained there, who lived in poor conditions. Afterwards, the fort was used as an ammunition depot again.

In 1982, the fort was bought by a wine merchant, who also used Fort near Spijkerboor since the 1970s. These forts were suitable for use as wine cellar, because the thick concrete walls made for a constant temperature.
