= Fort near Edam =

Fort in the Netherlands

- Fort bij Edam
- Part of Stelling van Amsterdam
- Near Edam in Netherlands
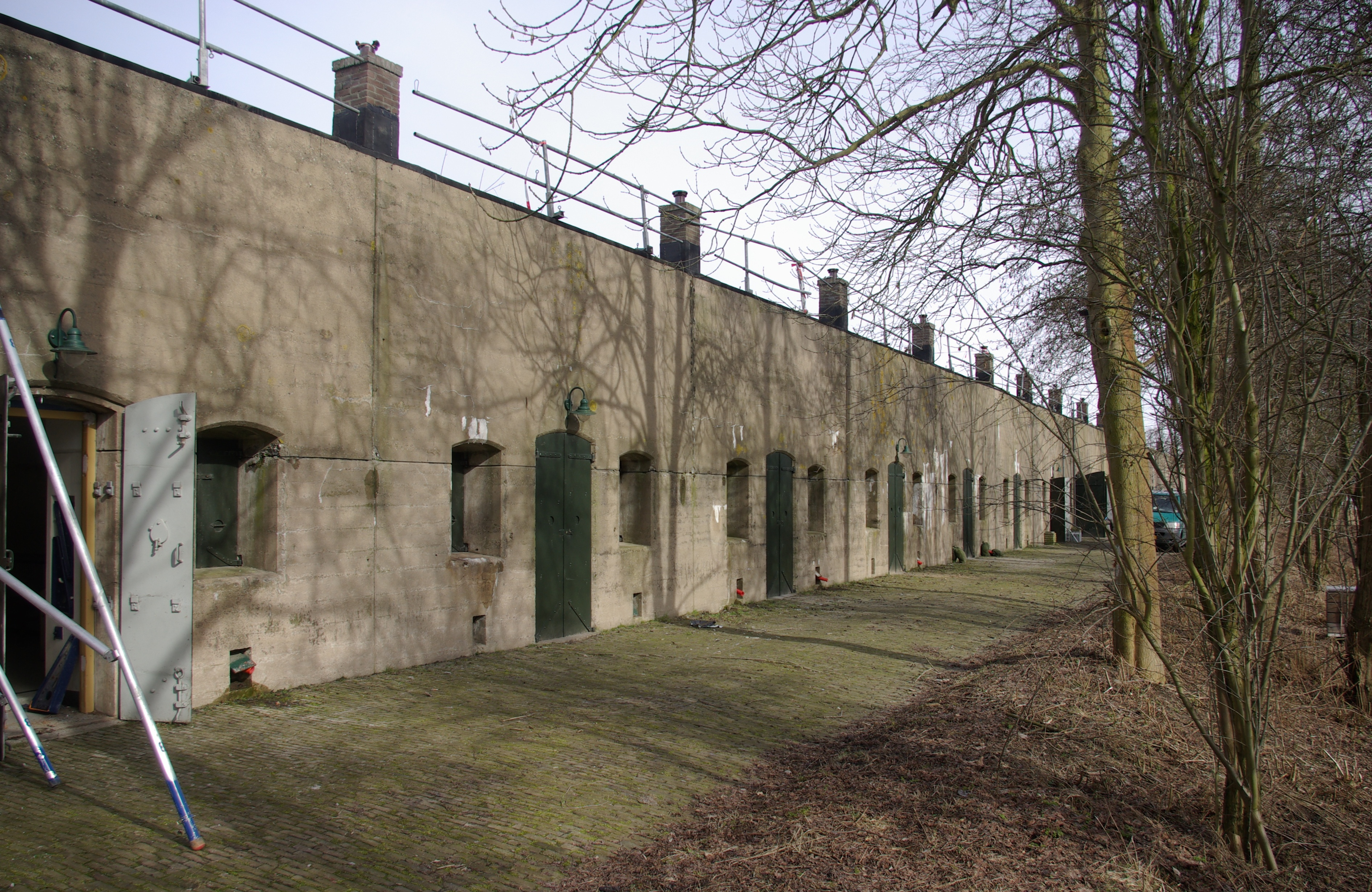

Site information
- Website: Official website

Location
- Coordinates: 52°31′4.1″N 5°4′1.9″E

Site history
- Built: 1914

The Fort near Edam (Dutch: Fort bij Edam) is a Dutch fort that is part of the Stelling van Amsterdam. It lies near the city of Edam. The fort protected the Edam lock, which was used to flood the Zeevang polder. The fort was finished between 1908 and 1914.

== History ==
The Zeevang polder was flooded during the German invasion of the Netherlands.

After the Second World War, the fort was used as a prison for women who had ties with German soldiers or members of the National Socialist Movement (NSB). For a short time, it would be used as internment camp for convicted collaborators. In 1948, it was used as an ammunition storage facility by the Dutch Army. In 1951, a shooting range was added, where the police and National Reserve Corps trained, which would later be used by a shooting club.

In 1986, the Dutch Army gave the fort to Staatsbosbeheer. It was barely used, which gave way to unique flora and fauna. It became a protected nature reserve. Since 2005, Staatsbosbeheer leases the fort to a foundation, which has made the fort accessible to the public.
