= Plofsluis =

Lock in the Netherlands

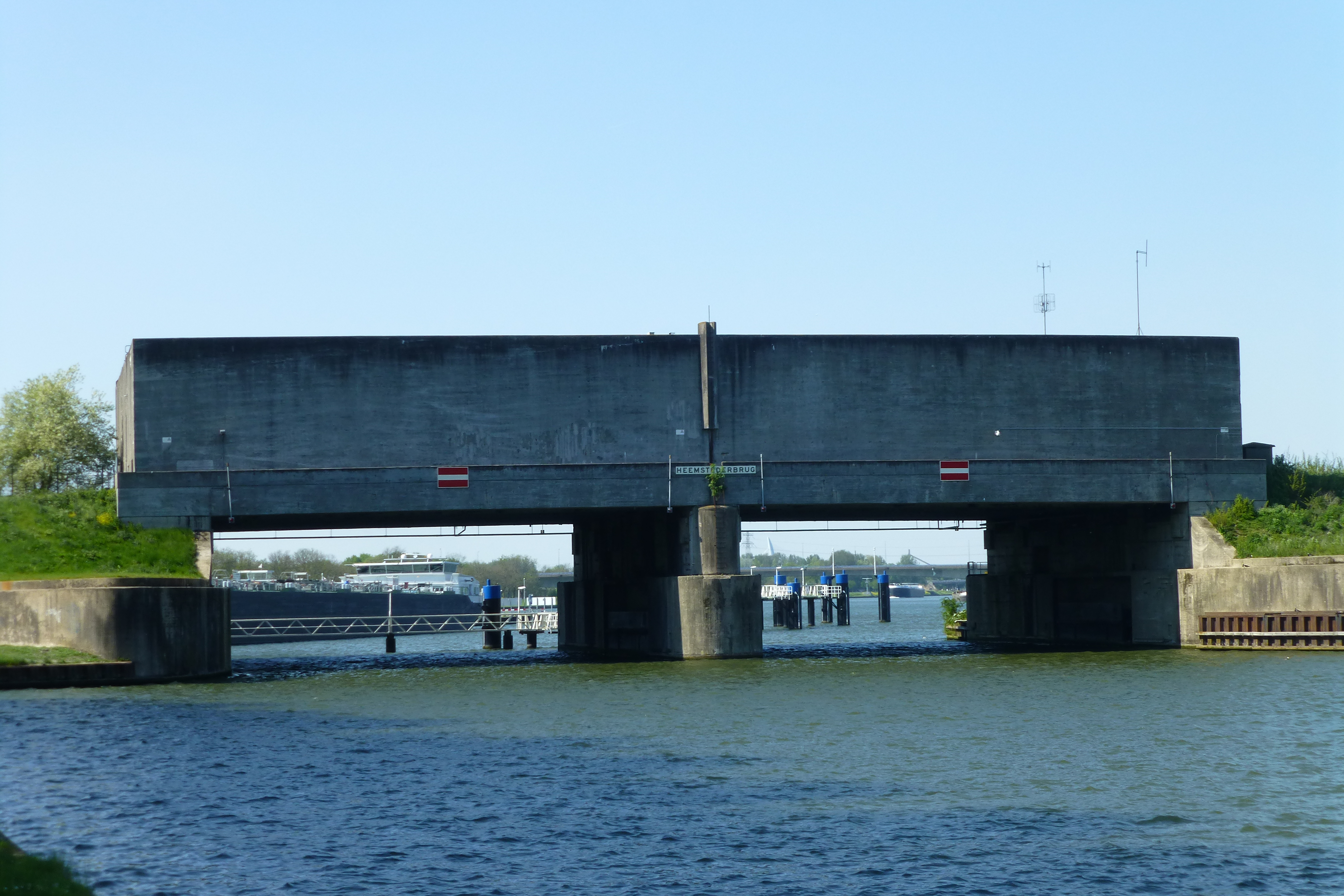
- The Plofsluis
- Interactive map of Plofsluis
- 52.0348°N 5.1149°E
- Waterway: Amsterdam–Rhine Canal
- Country: Netherlands
- Province: Utrecht
- Maintained by: Rijkswaterstaat
- Length: 70 meter
- Width: 40 meter
- Heritage status: Rijksmonument

The Plofsluis (lit. 'Explosion lock') or Keersluis bij Jutphaas (Control lock near Jutphaas) is a control lock in the Netherlands. It lies in the Amsterdam–Rhine Canal, between Nieuwegein and Houten, southeast of Fort Jutphaas.

== Purpose ==
As part of the New Dutch Waterline, it was constructed to quickly dam the canal, so water from the flooded surroundings would not flow away through the canal. To achieve this, 40 million kilos of rocks and rubble was held in five spaces meters above the water, which would collapse with explosives. The plofsluis has never been used.

== History ==
Building of the lock started in 1937, three years after work started on the Amsterdam-Rhine canal. Two pumping stations were also planned on both sides of the lock, so they could still influence the flow of water, but this was never finished due to the start of the Second World War in 1940. The lock was finished in 1942 by the German occupiers.

The lock became too small for the increasingly large inland shipping vessels. Demolition of the lock was too expensive, so instead the canal was widened in 1981 so ships could go around. The southern battery along the Overeindseweg was demolished for this. The spaces above the lock, which previously held the rocks and rubble, was temporarily used as storage of polluted soil.

Since 2014, the Plofsluis is a national monument and an unique part of the New Dutch Waterline. Nowhere else is a similar structure that could be activated into a large-scale lock by blowing it up. Due to the unique nature of the Waterline, it was added as a UNESCO World Heritage Site in 2021.

As from 2015, there is a cyclist bridge along the lock.

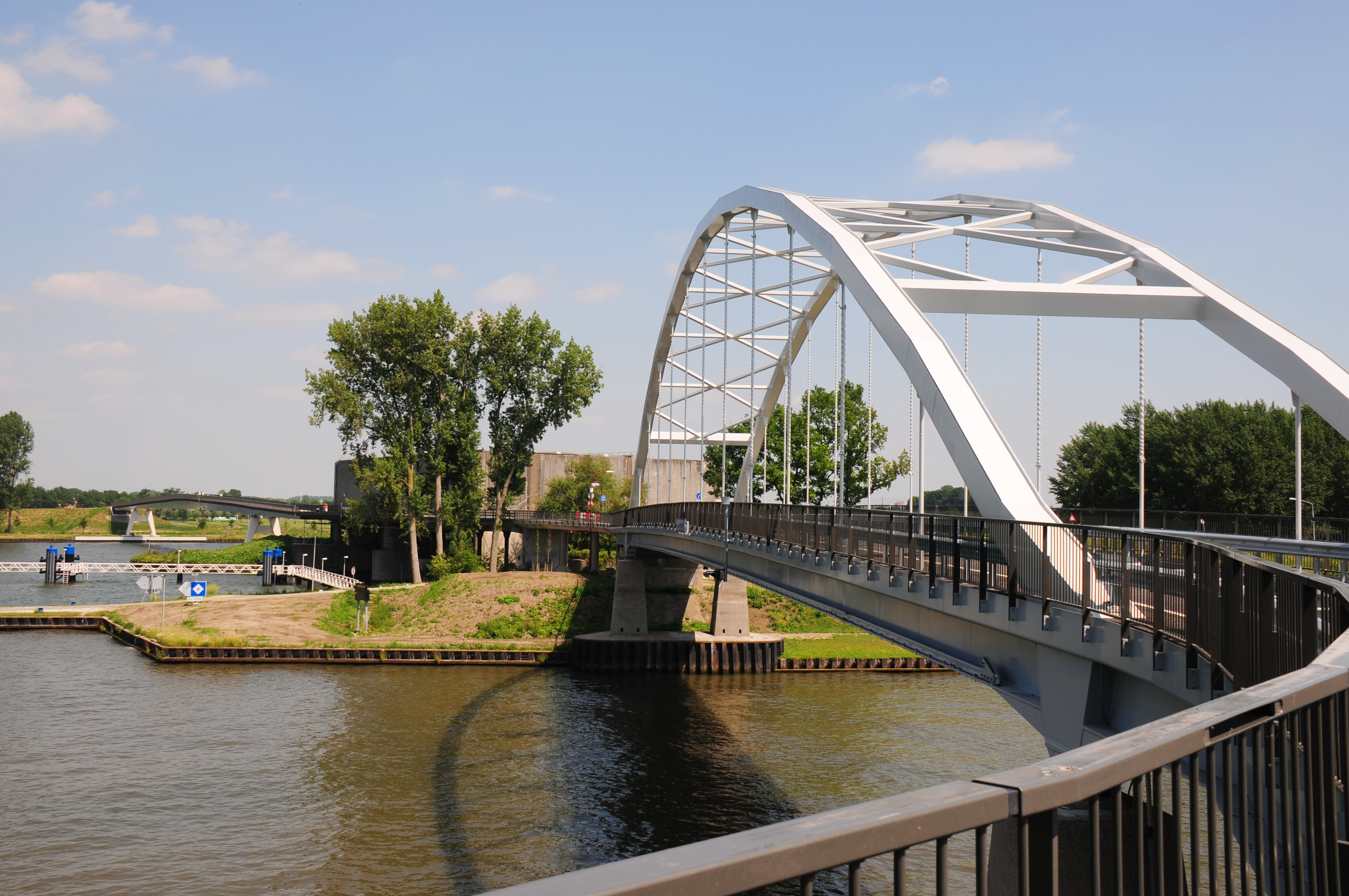
Plofsluis

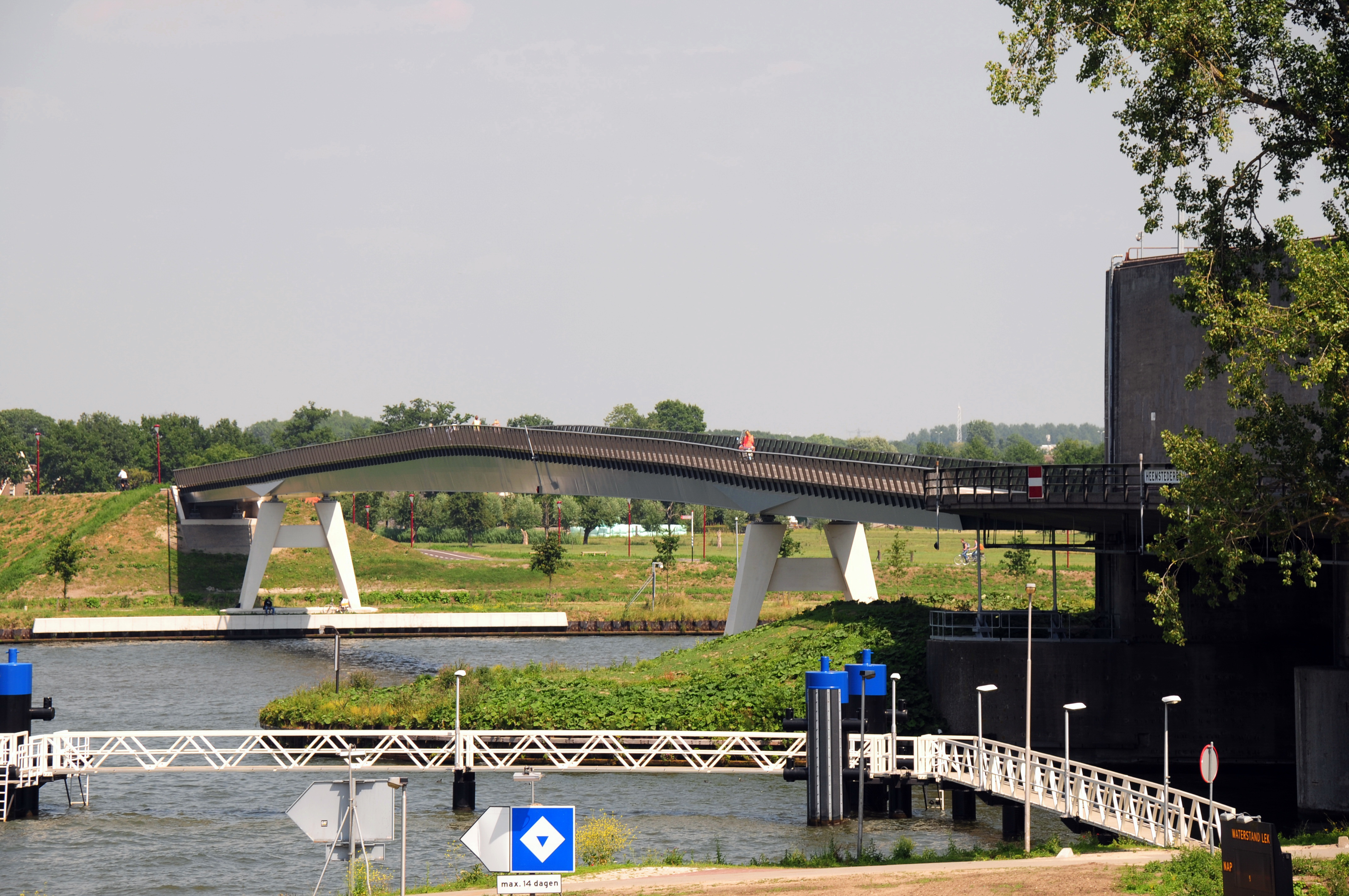
Cyclist bridge along the lock

Plofsluis seen from the north

View of the silos from the roof

View over the roof to the north with Utrecht in the distance.
