= Dutch Water Defence Lines =

Dutch Water Defence lines
UNESCO World Heritage Site
- Interactive map of Dutch Water Defence lines
- Location: North Holland, Utrecht, Netherlands
- Includes: Stelling van Amsterdam; New Dutch Waterline
- Criteria: Cultural: (ii), (iv), (v)
- Reference: 759bis
- Inscription: 1996 (20th Session)
- Extensions: 2021
- Area: 55,404.9 ha (136,908 acres)
- Buffer zone: 150,950.62 ha (373,007.1 acres)

The Dutch Water Defence lines (Dutch: Hollandse Waterlinies) is a UNESCO World Heritage Site in the Netherlands comprising the New Dutch Waterline and Stelling van Amsterdam. The Stelling van Amsterdam was added as a World Heritage Site in 1996, and was extended in 2021 with the New Dutch Waterline in 2021.
