= Type S-3 Bunker =

Type of Dutch fortification

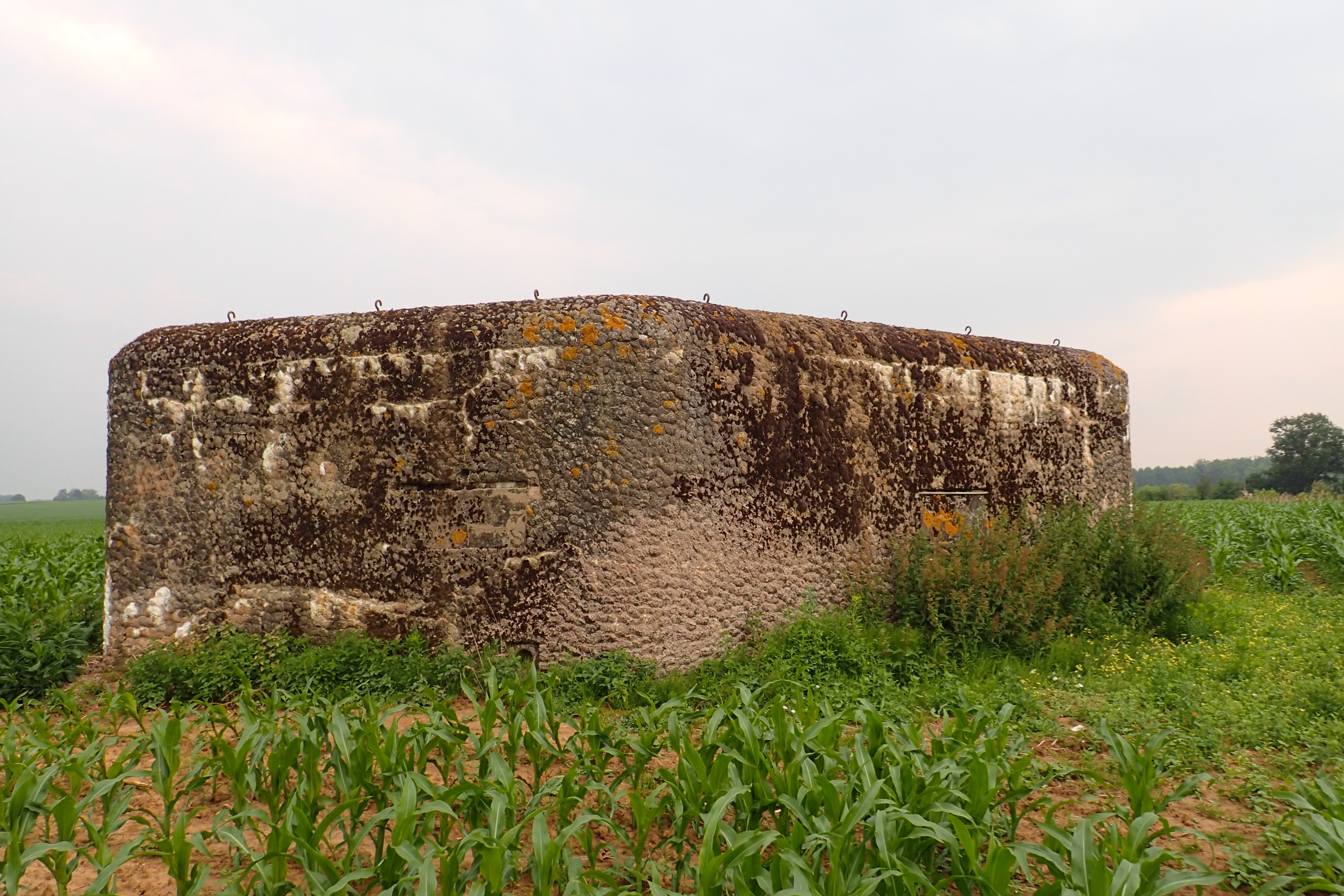
An abandoned Type S-3 bunker.

The Type S-3 bunker is a Dutch type of fortification dating from April 1939. The bunkers were widely deployed in the Netherlands' defensive lines after World War I.

== Characteristics ==
The S-3 Type bunker is a half-hexagon shape with three embrasures. The three embrasures gave the bunker a 190 degree field of fire. Each embrasure could be closed by a 20mm thick steel hatch. The embrasures had hatches to close them because there was only one machine gun. Unlike many contemporary bunkers of the time, the Lewis light machine gun could be moved between embrasures based on the commander's preference. The embrasures themselves were lined with steel anti-ricochet casings.

The side walls and roof were flat, making it weak to artillery since it could easily punch through the flat surface. The bunker was constructed out of very thin (0.8m) unreinforced concrete, further weakening the structure to modern artillery. On top of this, the bunker had very few amenities, meaning that the soldiers would have to leave the bunker to get food, use the bathroom, and get more ammo. The bunker also did not have a ventilator to remove the harmful gases from the machine gun. The bunker was commonly called the "Stekelvaren" (Dutch for porcupine) or "Spinnekop" (Dutch for spider head) due to the numerous hooks on the roof for attaching camouflage. The bunker's crew was three or four men.

== Deployment ==
The bunker design was adopted in April 1939, and was employed en masse in the newer defense lines.

- IJssel Line: 327 Type S-3 bunkers deployed between the IJssel and Maas (Meuse) Rivers as delaying positions
- Peel-Raam Line: 245 bunkers; mainly deployed in marshy areas
- Grebbe Line: 88 bunkers; part of the forward positions of Fortress Holland.
- 40 bunkers scattered around the Netherlands, mainly near the Maastricht Appendage.

=== Combat ===
While many casemates were unused or lightly damaged during the short German-Dutch war, one S-3 casemate served with distinction near Mill, Netherlands. One unknown Dutch soldier held a S-3 casemate alone against a German onslaught until relieved by the 2nd Hussars-Motorocylist Regiment.

A smashed Type S-3 Casemate in 1945.

Near Katwijk, Casemate 115S resisted the German invasion on May 10, 1940. The German 254th Division sought to capture the bridge at Mook. The bunker repelled two German assaults, so the Germans decided to use their 88mm anti-aircraft guns to try and make the Dutch retreat. Two out of the four defenders, Private Litjens and Sergeant Clevis, were killed in the fighting. Their two other comrades decided to abandon the bunker after their deaths, realizing that the bunker's thin walls couldn't protect them from the 88mm guns.

=== Occupation ===
Many of the bunkers were disused during the German occupation of the Netherlands due to their deficiencies in protection and armament. Nevertheless, some bunkers constructed along the Belgian border to emphasize Dutch neutrality were used by the Nazis when the Allies invaded Western Europe in June 1944. Other S-3 Type bunkers that were positioned at key waterways or road/railway junction were also kept for the defense of those areas.

== Post-war ==
A Type S-3 Casemate near Ghent.

After the war, the bunkers largely lost their importance as warfare shifted. Many of the bunkers were bricked up and sold off to private individuals. Many of the bunkers occupied by the Germans during the war were sealed and forgotten, as the memory of the war was to painful. Of the 763 Type S-3 Casemates built, it is estimated that a few hundred remain, but most are buried in dykes or sealed off after the war ended and were forgotten.
