= River Casemate =

Type of Dutch bunker found near waterways

A River Casemate is a Dutch type of fortification found commonly guarding bridges and waterways in the Netherlands. The casemate design dates from the time between the world wars.

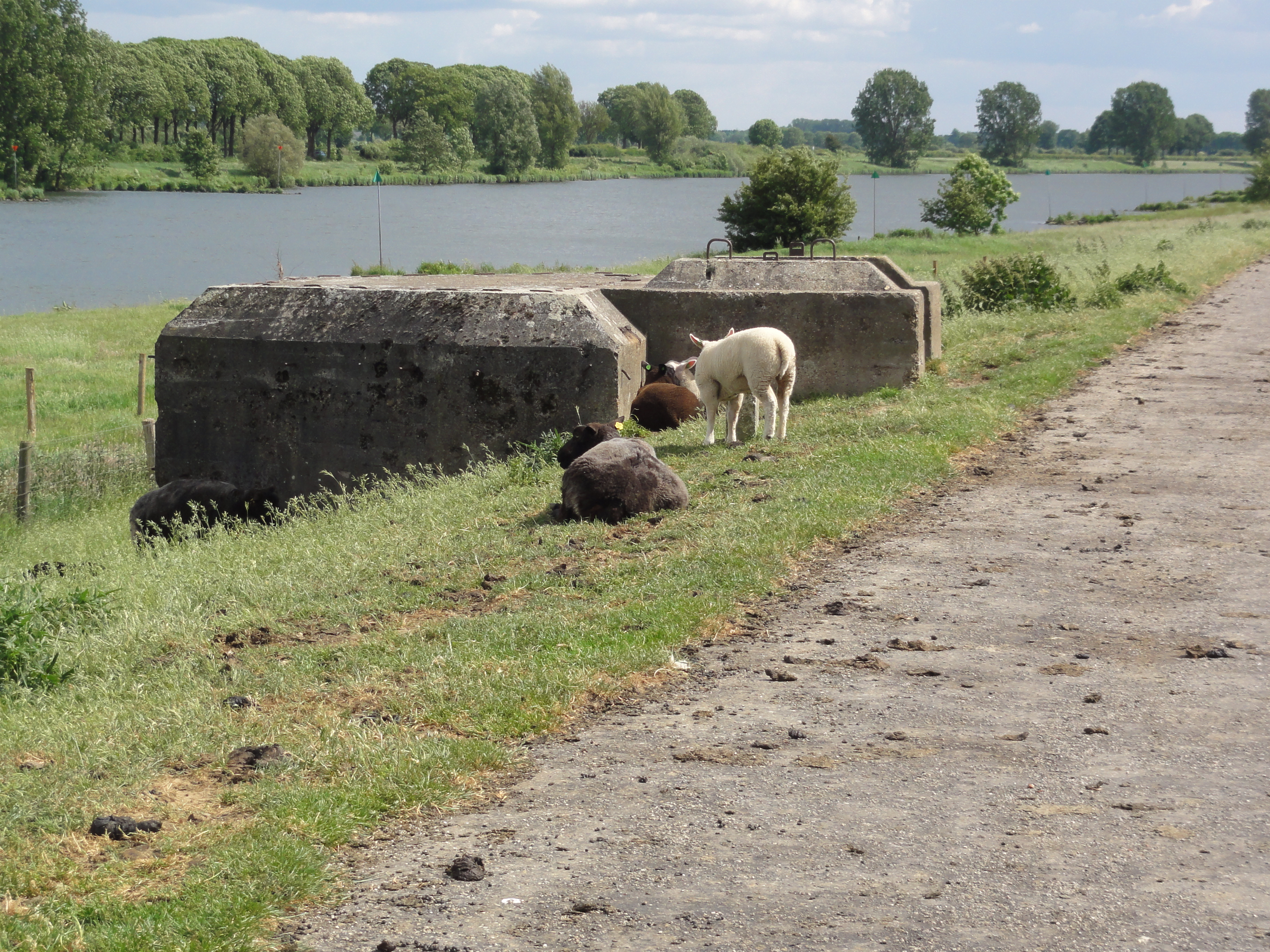
A River Casemate near Cuijk, North Brabant, Netherlands. The bunker is a protected site today.

== Characteristics ==
The design of the casemate dates from 1936, and the design was first built in 1937. The plan was to build the casemates near strategic waterways and roads. The Defense Ministry meant for the casemates to stop or slow an enemy assault long enough for general mobilization to begin. Many River Casemates, such as the one at Lent, housed the detonators for the nearby bridge or dam. The bridges were heavily protected because they offered a way through the Dutch lines. The bunkers were garrisoned by 5 special police called Korps Politietroepen, and 7 regular infantry. While most River Casemates are esentially the same, since no dike or river bank was the same, each River Casemate was tailored to suit the location.

Except for 2 locations, all casemates were constructed on the western bank (north-south running rivers) or the northern bank (east-west running rivers). The bunker's anti-tank guns were produced by the Dutch Army since the first company had gone out of business. Each bunker contained 175 high-energy shells and 375 anti-tank shells, showing the Dutch anticipated that armored vehicles would be their main adversary. The Schwarzlose M.08/15 heavy machine was adopted for use in almost every Dutch fortification, and was the only one used in River Casemates. Since the casemates guarded crucial infrastructure, they were manned constantly.

There were 3 different types of River Casemates, built to suit the defensive needs of the area.

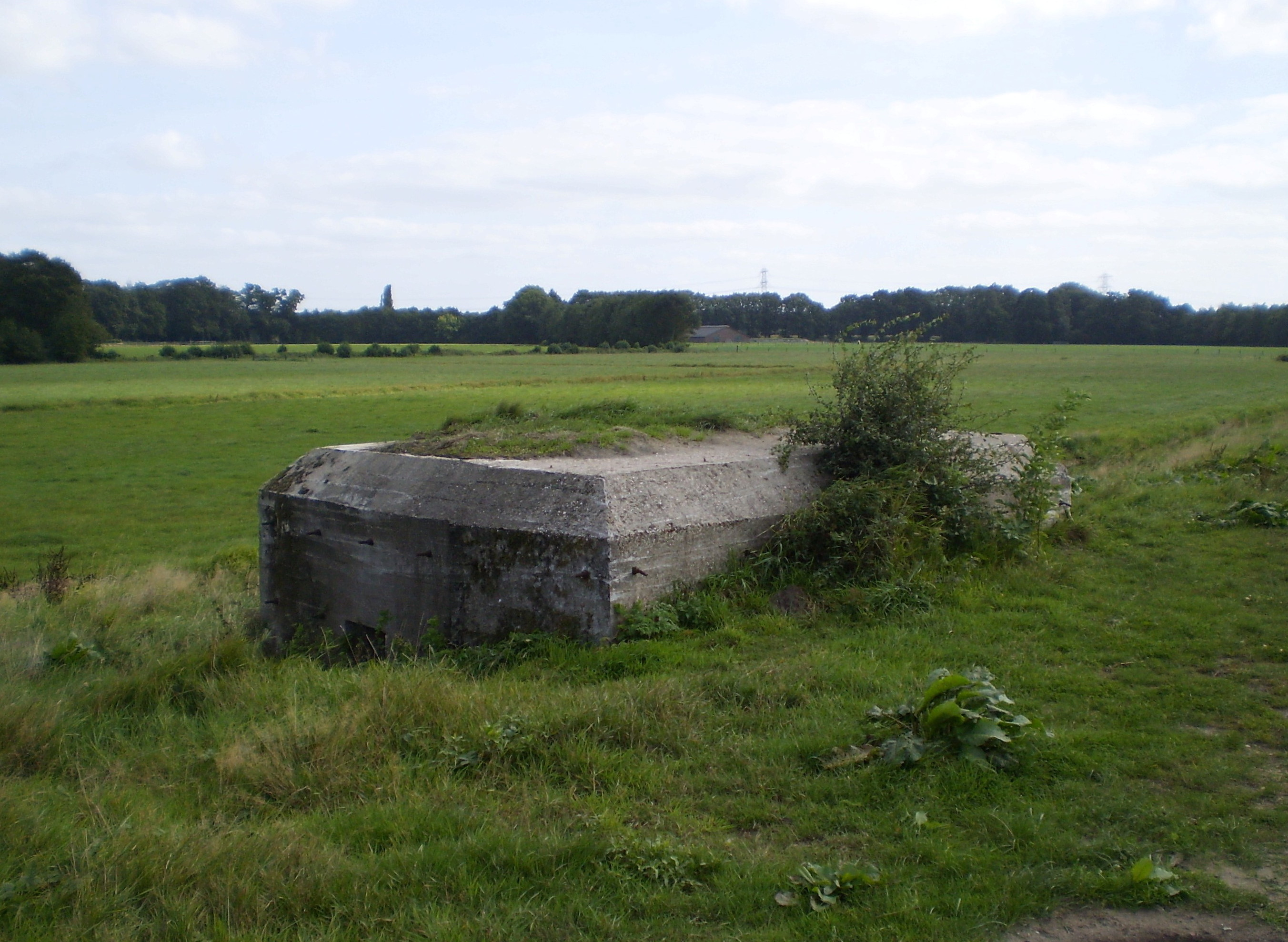
A Type A River Casemate, this bunker was constructed in the Grebbe Line.

Type A: The bunker was 1 story tall, and was armed with a heavy machine gun that could be put in 2 different embrasures and a 5cm anti-tank gun in an embrasure. These bunkers were usually placed where flooding was unlikely. The first bunkers of this type were built in 1936. Most of these bunkers were sited protecting bridges. 7 bunkers of this type were built across the Netherlands.

Type B: A different type of bunker was needed in the areas where the dikes were taller but building on top of the dikes left the bunker out in the open and exposed. The heavy machine gun and the 5cm anti-tank were located on the top floor of the bunker so that the dikes would not interfere with the fire of the guns. 19 of this type of bunker were constructed around the Netherlands.

Type C: Type C Casemates were a mix of type A and B casemates. This is why they are called double-casemates. The Type C has 2 fields of fire instead of the usual 1. The bunker was thus doubly armed, with 2 heavy machine guns and 2 5cm anti-tank guns. The bunkers were situated at critical road junctions and strategic bridges because it could cover both with its dual firing sectors. This type of bunker is found at 4 locations.

In total, 43 River Casemates were built across the Netherlands.

== Combat ==
At Lent, a Type B River Casemate demolished the bridge across the Waal as soon as German troops crossed the Dutch frontier. During the Battle of Mill, 12 policemen gallantly defended a Type B Casemate against the German 254th division. 6 policemen were killed within the bunker when a 88mm shell pierced the concrete wall.

== Post-war ==
A few casemates were destroyed during the German invasion in 1940. A slightly larger amount were destroyed during Operation Market Garden in 1944. More casemates were demolished after the war because they were in the way of development. Very few accessible River Casemates exist today due to odd locations. Here are the few that are accessible today.

River Casemate Lent-East

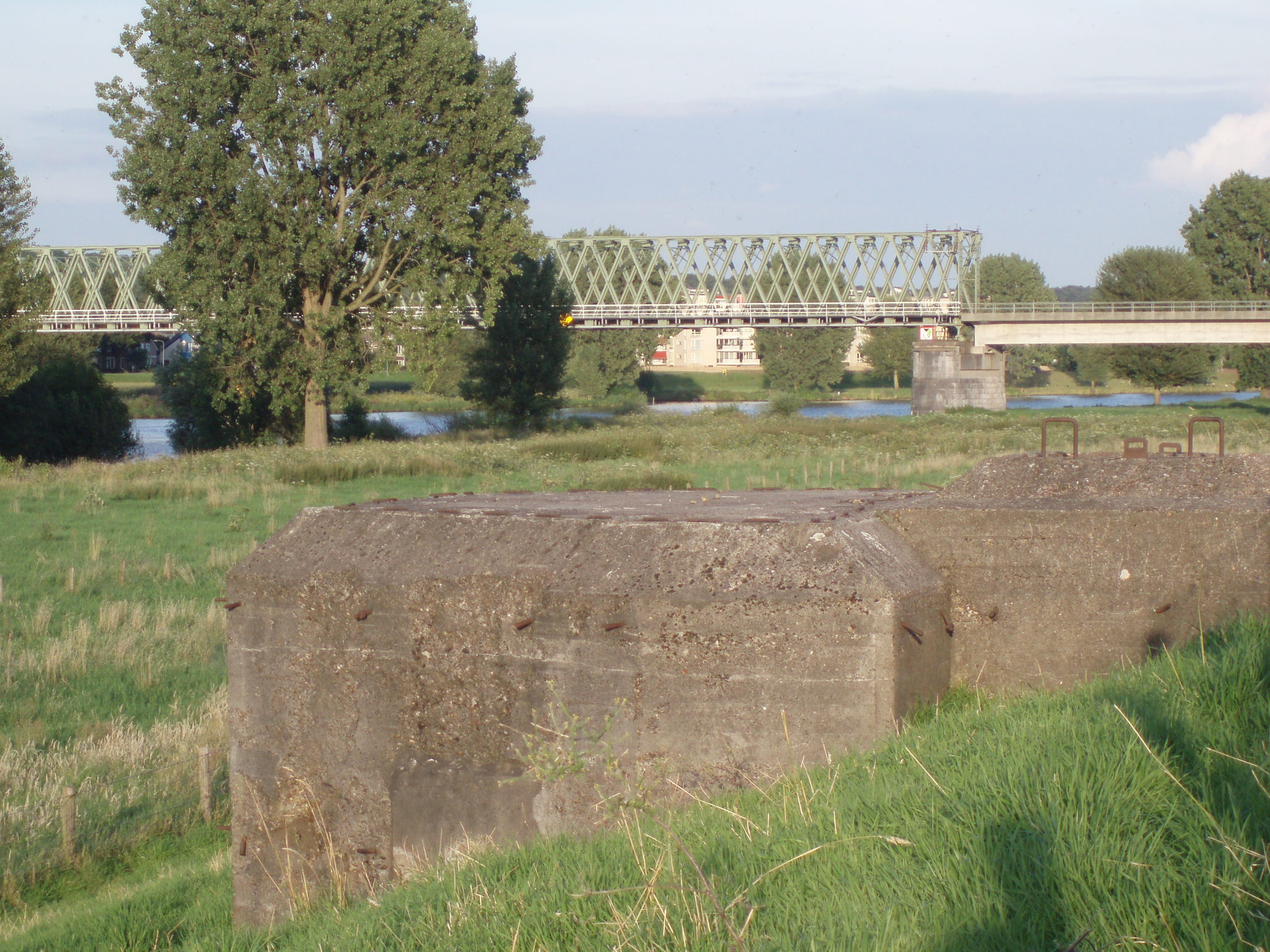
A River Casemate near Katwijk. The casemate is now a protected monument, and its number is 420214.

This casemate stands guard over the bridge at Nijmegen, and is in perfect condition due to a lack of combat.

River Casemate Zutphen-Zuid

The casemate is located on the banks of the IJssel River, and is largely intact.

Grave Bridge River Casemate

The casemate is a museum now and has been painted in its original dazzle camouflage meant to confuse enemy gunners. The casemate still shows signs of heavy damage from when American airborne troops used a bazooka to eliminate the German defenders.

River Casemate South

The River Casemate saw heavy action during the battle of Mill and is now a museum.
