= Type G Casemate =

Type of Dutch fortification

A Type G Casemate without its armored dome.

A Type G Casemate is a type of Dutch fortification built right before the beginning of World War II. It is commonly found in Dutch inter-war defensive lines.

== Characteristics ==
The main entrance was protected by a small-arms embrasure located across from the steel entrance door. The bunker could also be accessed via a steel hatch located on the roof, next to the armored turret. The armor of the dome was 10cm of cast-steel, making it very tough. The dome was cast in the Netherlands, and was first used in 1936. The creation of the armored dome is due to a defense report put out that year detailing the shortcomings of Dutch bunkers. The interior of the dome was 175cm wide, while cramped, it contained all of the crucial components of an armored dome. The smaller profile made it harder to hit and easier to camouflage. The dome was also airtight and air conditioned, and the machine gun was equipped with a water pump to keep it from overheating. The turret was armed with a Schwarzlose M.08/15 machine gun mounted in an airtight embrasure. The turret was also equipped with a chute that remove the hot, spent shells from the turret.

The edges of the bunker were rounded as it helped ricochet the incoming shell. The inside of the bunker was ventilated via a manually operated M.39 ventilator. The ventilator created overpressure within the bunker to keep poison gases out and help remove the harmful gases from the bullets. Inside was also a telephone switchboard and a field telephone for communicating with the other nearby bunkers. Inside the bunker was a coat rack containing helmets for the defenders. Also inside was a small storage room, mainly for machine gun ammo, but small quantities of small-arms ammo was stored there too.

== Deployment ==
702 armored domes were constructed by May 10, 1940, and most of them were em placed in bunkers. The bunkers are common in the New Dutch Water Line and the Grebbe Line. They are also found guarding the Flushing Harbor and various other important coastal sites. Here is the deployment numbers:

- Grebbe Line: 144 bunkers
- IJssel Line: 157 bunkers
- Maas Line: 154 bunkers
- Peel-Raam Line: 33 bunkers

== Combat experience ==
On May 11, 1940, around 3:30pm, a Junkers Ju 87 dropped a 50kg bomb on a Type G casemate of the Bath Line. The bomb exploded directly next to the bunker, but surprisingly didn’t demolish it. The blast tilted the bunker at an odd angle, but the bunker was still operable. The Dutch defenders continued fighting despite their odd situation.

Despite the tenacious defense of the Bath Line casemate, Type G casemates performed horribly at the Gennep Railway Bridge. Here, German commandos called Brandenburgers dressed as Dutch policemen to try and fool the bridge detonation teams. They successfully neutralized the sentries and proceeded past the Type G bunkers which hadn’t been alerted to the German presence. The narrow firing degree of the casemates meant that once the commandos had passed, they couldn’t be fired on. This lack of alertness allowed several German armored trains to pass over the bridge and breach the Peel-Raam Line.

== Post-German invasion ==
During the German occupation, most of the turrets from the Type G bunkers were either scrapped using explosives or placed in coastal positions as part of the Atlantikwall. Whatever bunkers were sited correctly were incorporated into the Atlantic Wall fortifications and staffed accordingly. Not all bunkers were demolished if they were not sited correctly, such as a casemate built near the town of Flushing. It was used by the Germans to control a mine barrage nearby.

== Post-war to today ==
After the war ended, many of the bunkers were torn down because of how the Germans extracted the turrets or because they were simply in the way. As of 2000, only about 9 intact casemates remain. These are located in:

- Fort Bij Vechten: 3 bunkers
- Flushing: 2 bunkers
- About 4 other bunkers remain intact around the country, although their location is not well known since the surveys were taken in 2000.
