= IJssel Line =

NATO defences along IJssel river, Netherlands

- Netherlands
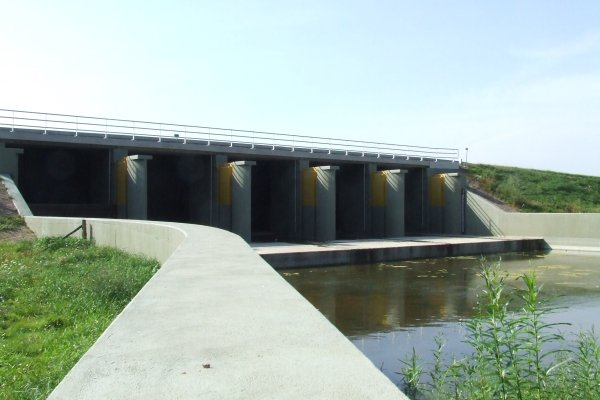
- Reconstructed inlet near Olst

Site information
- Type: Defensive line
- Controlled by: Netherlands
- Condition: parts visible

Site history
- Built: 1951–1955
- In use: 1951–1968
- Materials: Flooded plains, earth walls, brick, concrete, steel
- Demolished: 1968

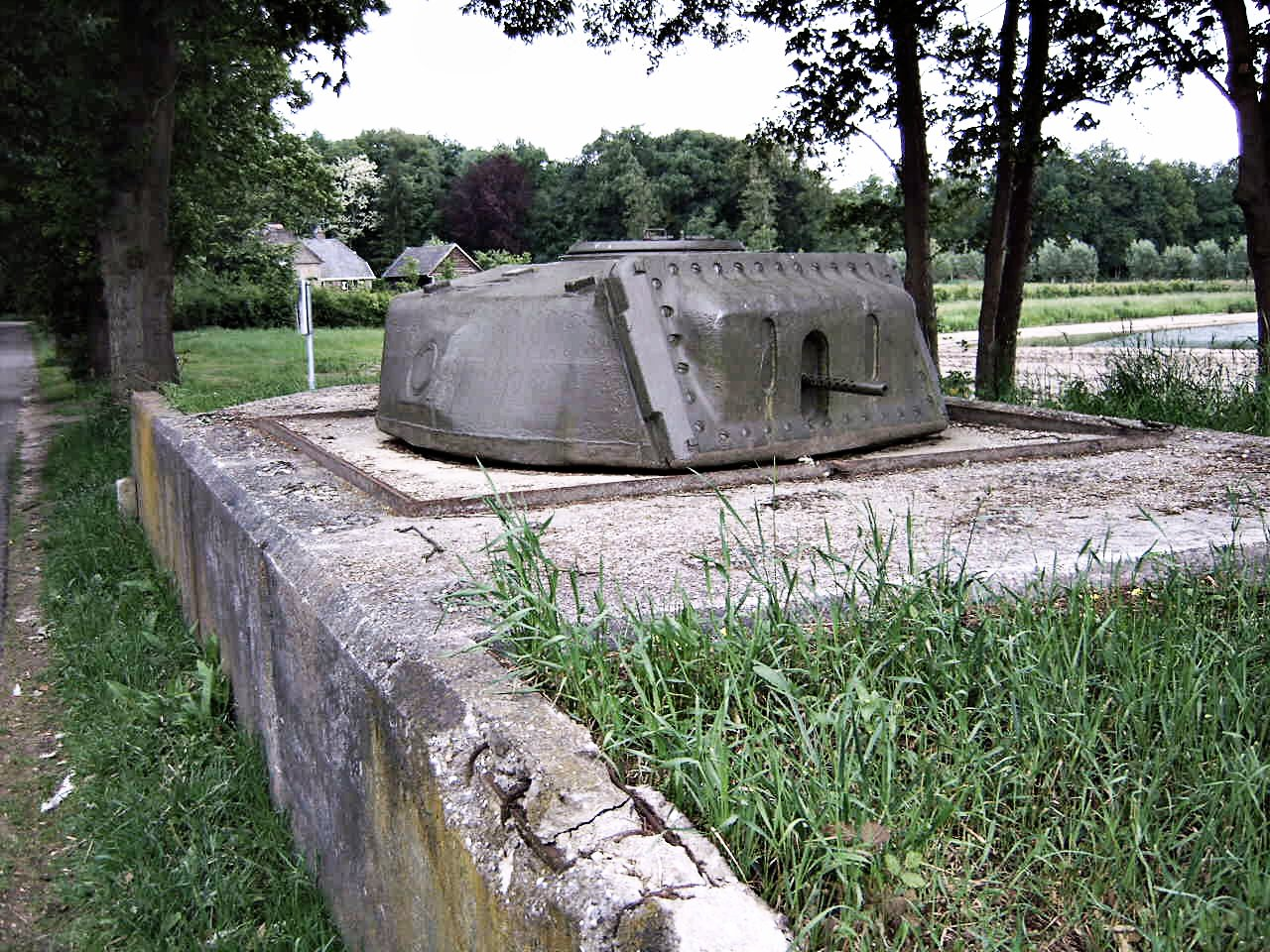
A Ram turret in the IJssel Line, still present in 2007

The IJssel Line (Dutch: IJssellinie) was the Dutch portion of the NATO Cold War line of defence for Western Europe during the 1950s and 1960s. It consisted of anti-aircraft and four-barrel machine gun bunkers, command and hospital bunkers, and many Ram and Sherman tank bunkers encased in concrete, leaving the turrets exposed. These elements were placed along the IJssel river.

Movable floating dams were built in the Lower Rhine and Waal rivers. By diverting the flow of water from Germany into the IJssel River, the entire IJssel valley of 127 km (79 mi) could be inundated to form a line of defence against an anticipated Soviet invasion. Many Dutch bunkers from before World War II, such as the Type S-3 Bunker, Type G Casemate, and Type B Bunker were incorporated into the defenses despite their age. Extensive flooding of the IJssel floodplains and the surrounding areas was intended as a substantial barrier between Nijmegen and Kampen. To ensure a sufficient amount of water for the area north of Deventer, a third movable floating dam was added at Olst. Flood waters were to be released from the IJssel River by means of 15 water intake works and 750 other water regulating structures. The flood water would then inundate large areas inside the winter dikes. Behind the line of defence, five motorised infantry divisions of the Dutch field army were to be positioned. The IJssel line of defense was intended to slow down a Soviet offensive, providing time for Allied support to reach the Netherlands. The IJssel Line would have been a northern extension of NATO main defences along the River Rhine, preventing an almost immediate occupation of the Randstad Holland as would have been the case in the original version of the NATO plan, envisaging a more southern defence in this area, along the Lower Rhine or Waal, abandoning the major Dutch cities and ports to the enemy. The new plan was developed by Captain Joop Haex, the later Dutch State Secretary for Defence. The line was abolished after 1968, when the NATO strategy of forward defence along the Inner German Border was adopted.

Earlier, during the 16th and 17th century, and at the time of the German invasion of 1940, fortified defensive lines along the IJssel had been created, which also were called IJssel Line.

The IJssel Line Foundation was formed as a voluntary body in 2003 to maintain the buildings and structures as historical monuments.

== See also ==
- Defence lines of the Netherlands
