= Voorst (disambiguation) =

Voorst is a municipality and town in Gelderland.

Voorst may also refer to:

- Voorst, Limburg, a town in Roerdalen
- Voorst, Oude IJsselstreek, in Gelderland
- van Voorst tot Voorst, a Dutch noble family
  - Berend-Jan van Voorst tot Voorst (born 1944), Dutch politician and diplomat
  - Eduardus van Voorst tot Voorst (1874–1945), Dutch sport shooter
  - Herman van Voorst tot Voorst (1886–1971), Dutch Army officer and politician
  - Godfried van Voorst tot Voorst (1880–1963), officer of the Dutch armed forces
- Carol van Voorst (born 1952), American diplomat
