= Landzaat =

Landzaat is a Dutch surname. Notable people with the surname include:

- André Landzaat (1944–2025), Dutch actor
- Denny Landzaat (born 1976), Dutch footballer
- Willem Pieter Landzaat (1886–1940), Dutch war hero, recipient of the Military William Order

Fictional characters:

- Faldio Landzaat, character in the Valkyria Chronicles series
- Karl Landzaat, character in the Valkyria Chronicles series
