= Ouwehands Dierenpark =

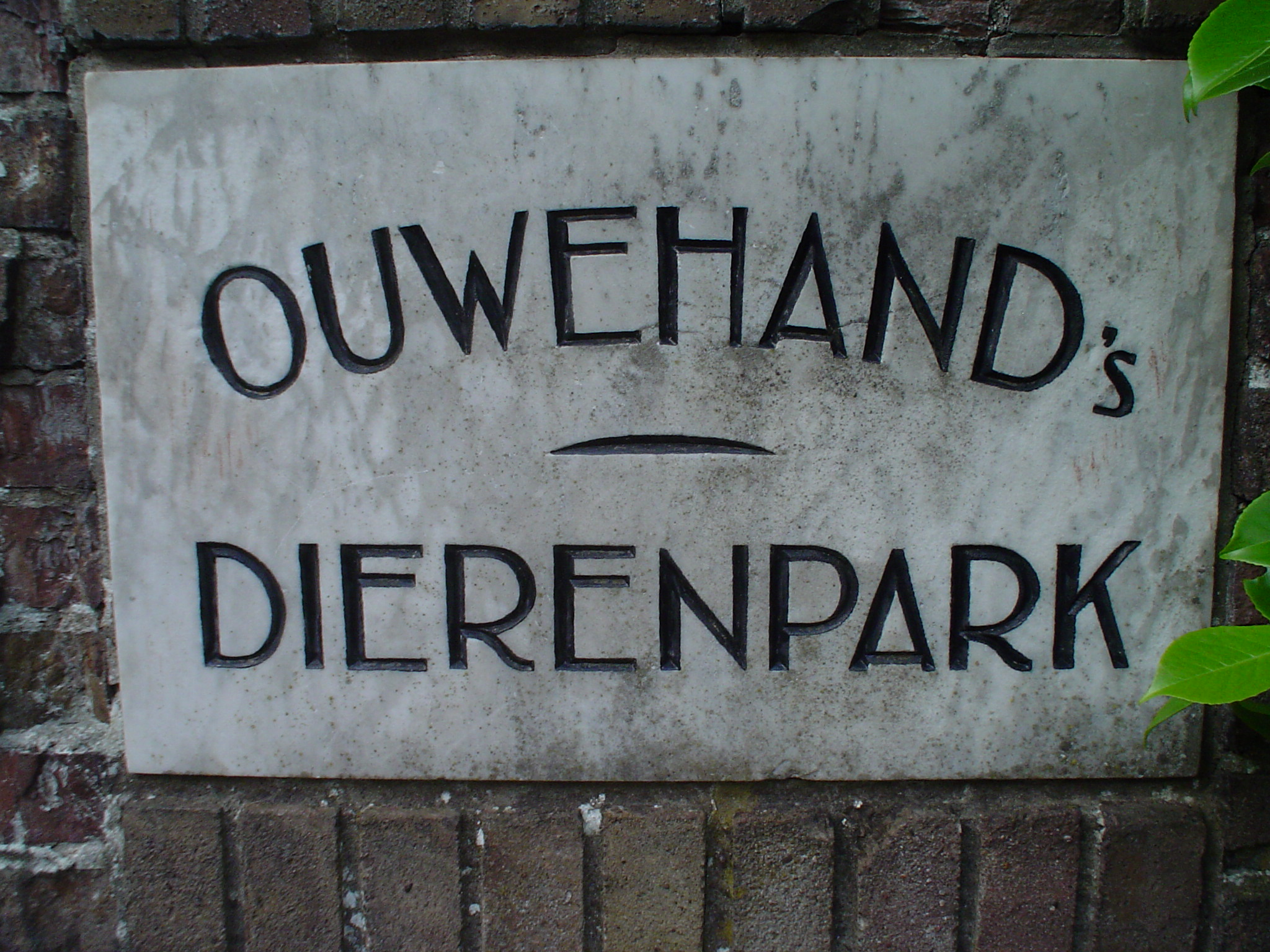
- 51°57′22″N 5°35′27″E
- Date opened: 1932
- Location: Rhenen, Netherlands
- Land area: 22 hectares (54 acres)
- Memberships: EAZA, NVD
- Major exhibits: European and exotic species Berenbos
- Website: http://www.ouwehand.nl

Ouwehands Dierenpark is a zoo in Rhenen, in the Dutch province of Utrecht. The zoo is located on the Laarschenberg, a "mountain" that makes up the south-eastern tip of the great Utrecht Hill Ridge.

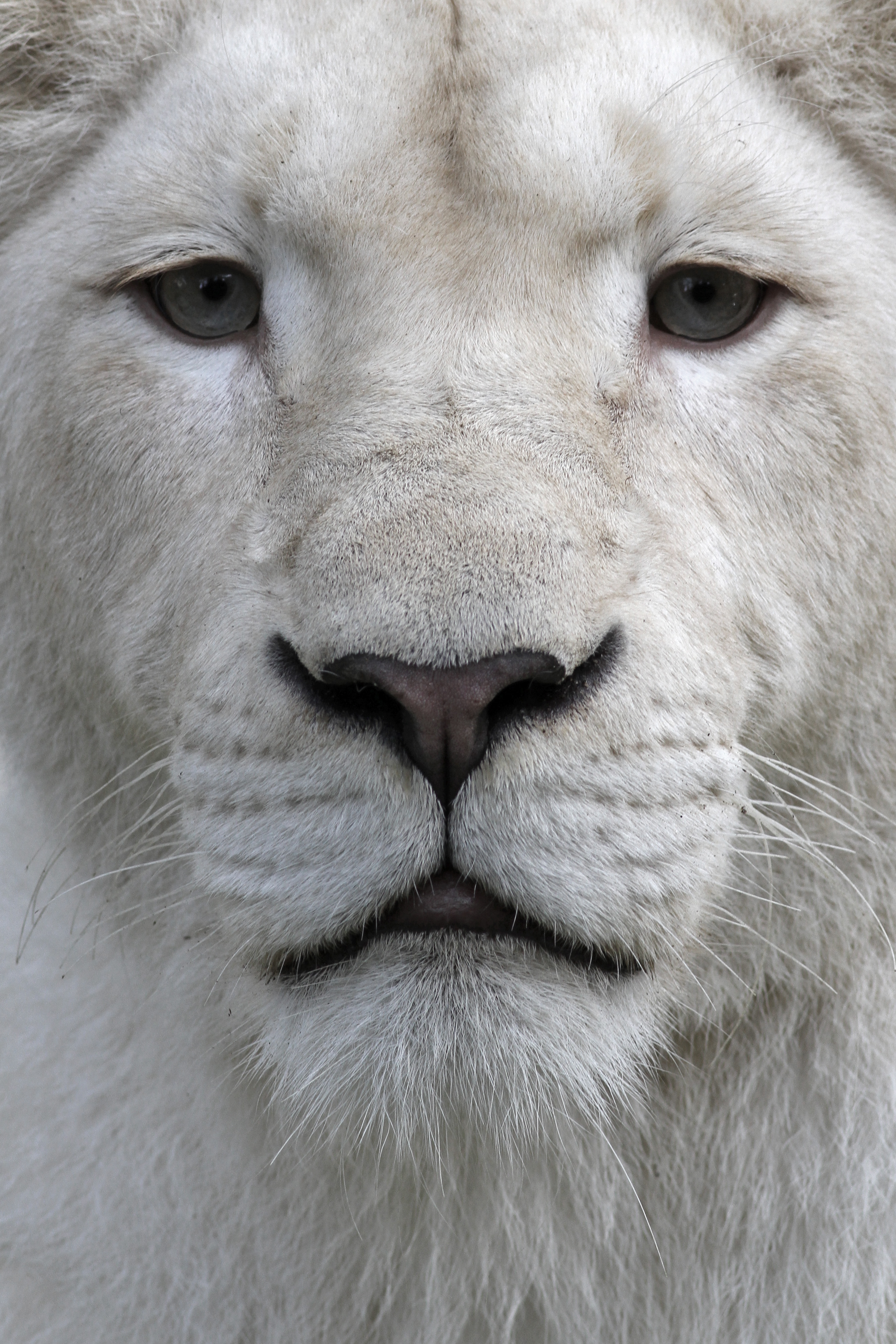
The zoo has held white lions since 2001

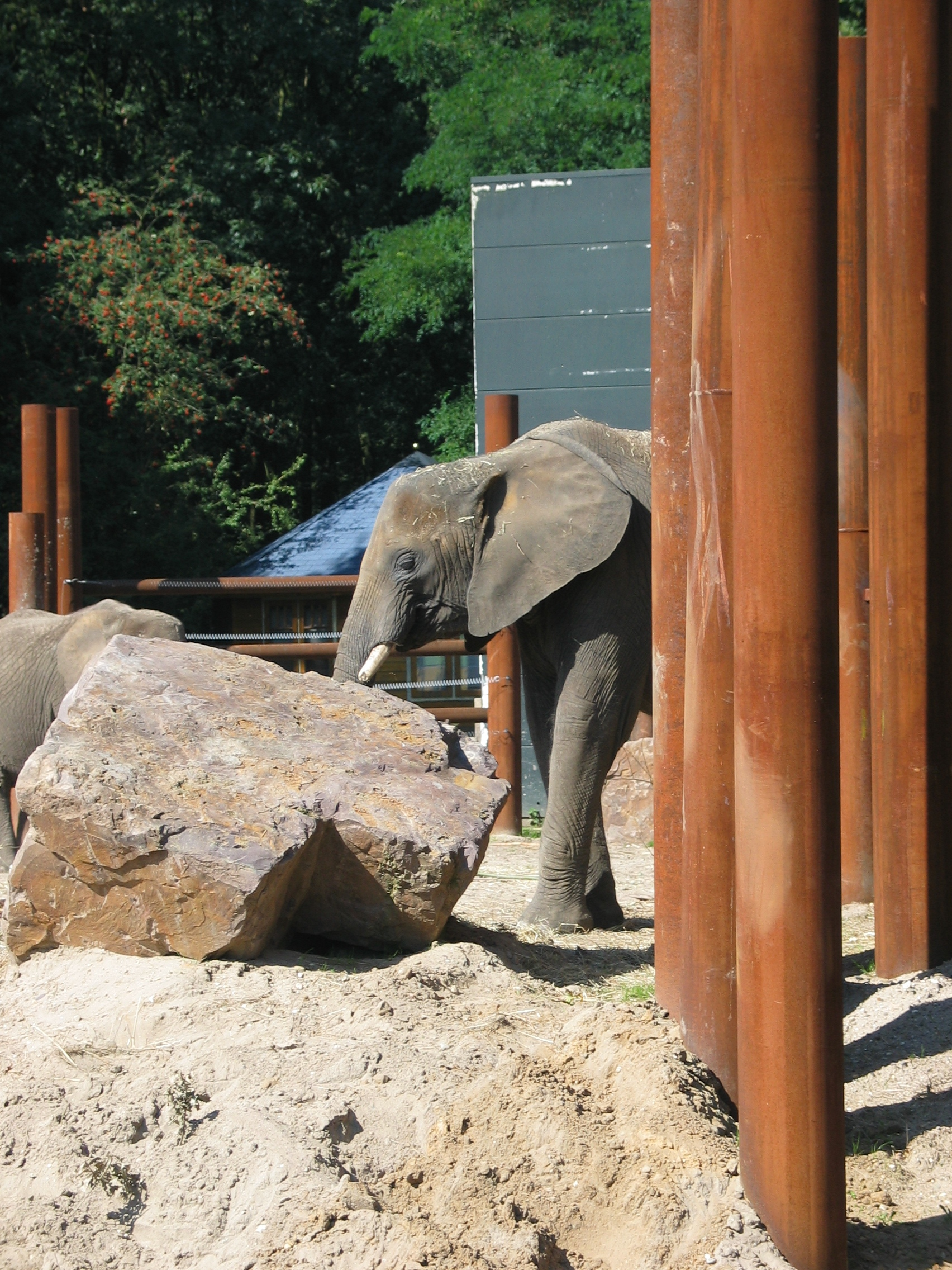
African elephant

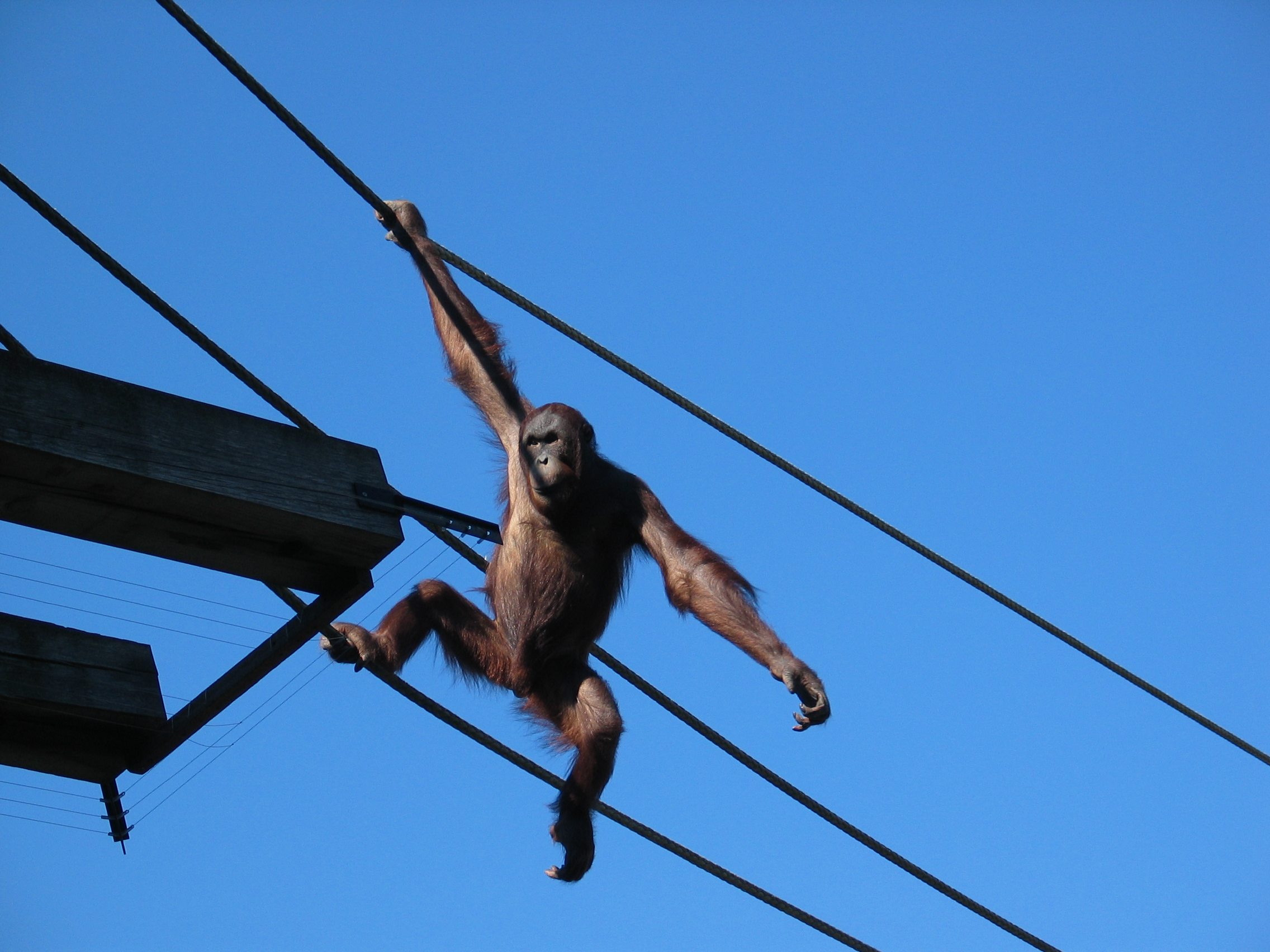
Young orangutan, September 2006

== History ==
=== Chicken farm ===
The zoo's founder, Cor Ouwehand, had moved from Rotterdam to Rhenen to start a cigar factory, but changed his mind and started a small farm on the Grebbeberg in 1919. In addition to chickens (his primary livestock), Ouwehand kept a number of other animals as well, including raccoons, peafowl and pheasants, quickly drawing public interest.

=== 1930s ===
During the Great Depression of the 1930s, the chicken farm lost much of its business, though people continued visiting simply to see the animals. This led to Ouwehand turning his farm into a small zoo. After having visited other European zoos to gather ideas, he officially opened on 18 June 1932.

Ouwehands Dierenpark, at its fifth anniversary.

=== The war and after ===
The park's commercial success had an unintended side-effect, as, prior to the outbreak of World War II, the Dutch government had attempted to secure its defenses against a German invasion. The Grebbe Line, a defensive line built in the 1700s to protect the Dutch Waterline, ran through the Grebbeberg (on which the zoo was built). German officers, in civilian clothes, visited the zoo while the Grebbe Line was being rebuilt; from this visit, the men were able to establish that the Grebbeberg was a "weak" spot in the line, since the bomb-proof pumping equipment—necessary to inundate the area in the case of an invasion—would not be finished by May 1940.

During the ensuing Battle of the Grebbeberg (11–13 May 1940), the Dutch authorities demanded that all "dangerous" animals in the zoo (among other zoos) be killed to prevent their escape if the facilities were inadvertently bombed. Ouwehand, trusting his own aim with a firearm over that of a Dutch soldier, took it upon himself to complete the task. After the war, the gradual rebuilding and reconstruction was slow. Ouwehand died in 1950, with his son, Bram, and his son-in-law, Jo Baars, taking over. Official compensation for the animals shot in World War II was not granted until 1953.

Between 1950 and 2000 the zoo's area more than doubled to 22 ha. But further expansion was prevented by the municipality; some larger and more expensive animals, including hippos, elephants, gorillas, and chimpanzees, were relocated due to lack of funding or space. By the end of the 1990s, the zoo was effectively bankrupt, receiving less than a half a million visitors per year.

Fortunes improved when, in 2000, the zoo was bought by millionaire businessman Marcel Boekhoorn. Upon acquiring the zoo, Boekhoorn invested in new accommodations for the lions, tigers, polar bears and elephants, and built playgrounds for visitors' children as well as a new restaurant. Boekhoorn also began a pursuit to bring giant pandas to the zoo (on loan from China), which became a reality in 2017.

== Timeline ==
- 1932 – Ouwehands Dierenpark opened
- 1940–1945 – Second World War, A number of animals stay as at a farm in Doorn
- 1978 – Aquarium opened
- 1985 – Primate house opened
- 1993 – The bear forest opened
- 1995 – Asian Elephants get a new enclosure
- 1997 – Tiger forest opened, Elephants relocated
- 1998 – Lapponian exhibit with reindeer, eagles and owls opened
- 1999 – Beaver enclosure opened
- 2000 – Enclosures for polar bears and Femke van Eekelen s opened
- 2001 – Urucu (tropical Area) opened
- 2003 – Ravot Aapia (the largest European play jungle) is opened
- 2004 – Start of ZOOP
- 2005 – Umkhosi (African playground with African animals) is opened
- 2006 – Two African elephants are added to the zoo
- 2007 – At the 75th anniversary of the elephants time at the zoo, a male area is opened
- 2009 – A new stay for the Humboldt penguins next to the polar bear stay
- 2011 – A new sea lion theater is being delivered
- 2013 – Gorilla Adventure opens
- 2014 – The renewed Bear Forest is opened
- 2015 – A new barnacle aquarium is added. The largest of its kind in Europe.
- 2024 – Orangutan male bako dies
