= Grebbeberg War Cemetery =

WWII cemetery in the Netherlands

- Netherlands War Graves Foundation; Oorlogsgravenstichting
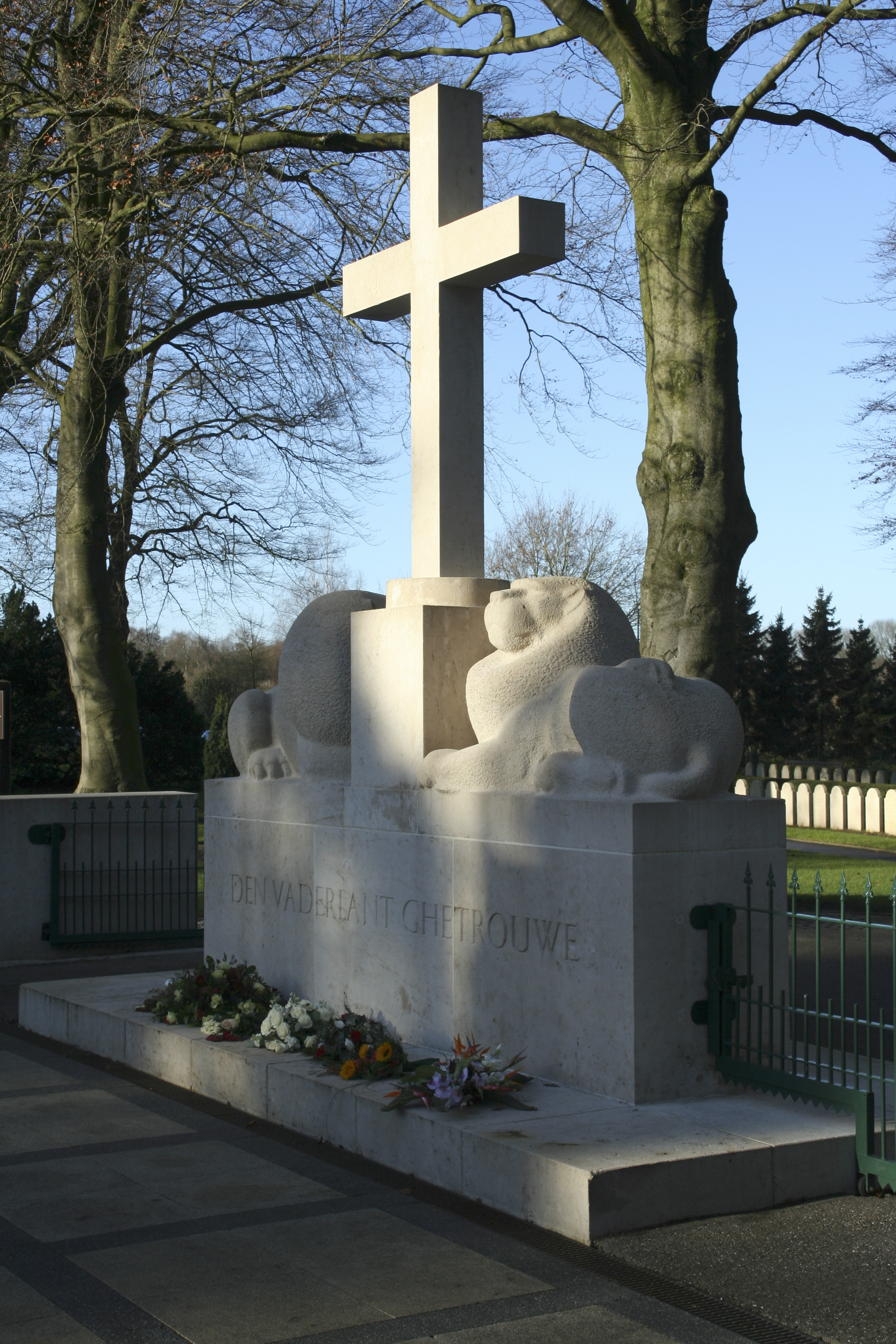
- Cross of Remembrance at the entrance
- Used for those deceased 1940–1945
- Established: 20-5-1940
- Location: 51°57′21″N 5°36′1″E near Rhenen, Netherlands.
- Designed by: Jacobus Oud
- Total burials: 850

Burials by war
- World War II

Grebbeberg War Cemetery (Dutch: Militair Ereveld Grebbeberg) is a Second World War military war grave cemetery, located on the Grebbeberg, a hill 2 km (1.2 mi) east of Rhenen the Netherlands. The cemetery contains 799 military personnel and one civilian who died during the invasion of the Netherlands by the Germans in May 1940. More than 400 of those interred in the cemetery fell during the Battle of the Grebbeberg.

== History ==
Immediately after the surrender of the Netherlands, a cemetery was laid out at the Grebbeberg for both Dutch and German dead. On 20 May 1940, the cemetery was completed and all the dead were buried. On 27 May all field graves were cleared from around Grebbeberg and the remains were reburied within the cemetery.

The cemetery contained 380 Dutch graves and about 150 German graves. The graves were marked with wooden signs with the name of the soldier, if known. In 1942, a stone wall was built around the cemetery and all tombstones were replaced with headstones. Until that time, many family members or relatives had their own headstone placed on the grave. After the German surrender andfollowing the end of the war, all German graves were moved to the Ysselsteyn German war cemetery. Until 1 January 1952 the cemetery was maintained by the Ministry of Defence, which at that date, transferred it to the Netherlands War Graves Foundation.

The reconstruction of the history of the National Army Monument Grebbeberg shows how the designer, architect J.J.P. Oud, in 1948–1953 conducted intensive consultations with the client about the meaning and symbolism of the monument.

Since the 1960s, many soldiers were moved from local graves to the cemetery.

== Special significance ==
The cemetery has a special significance because it is located exactly at the point in the Netherlands where the fiercest fighting took place during the Second World War. After the surrender, it became the first official Dutch war cemetery. After the fighting (and the Dutch capitulation) the German occupiers ordered a search for victims from both sides to have them properly buried.

== Commemoration ==
Since 1946, this cemetery serves as a national memorial site. Here the military memorial ceremony held on Remembrance of the Dead, 4 May. In addition, on Whit, a commemoration of the former Eighth Regiment Infantry takes place, where all the colleagues who died during the May days are commemorated.

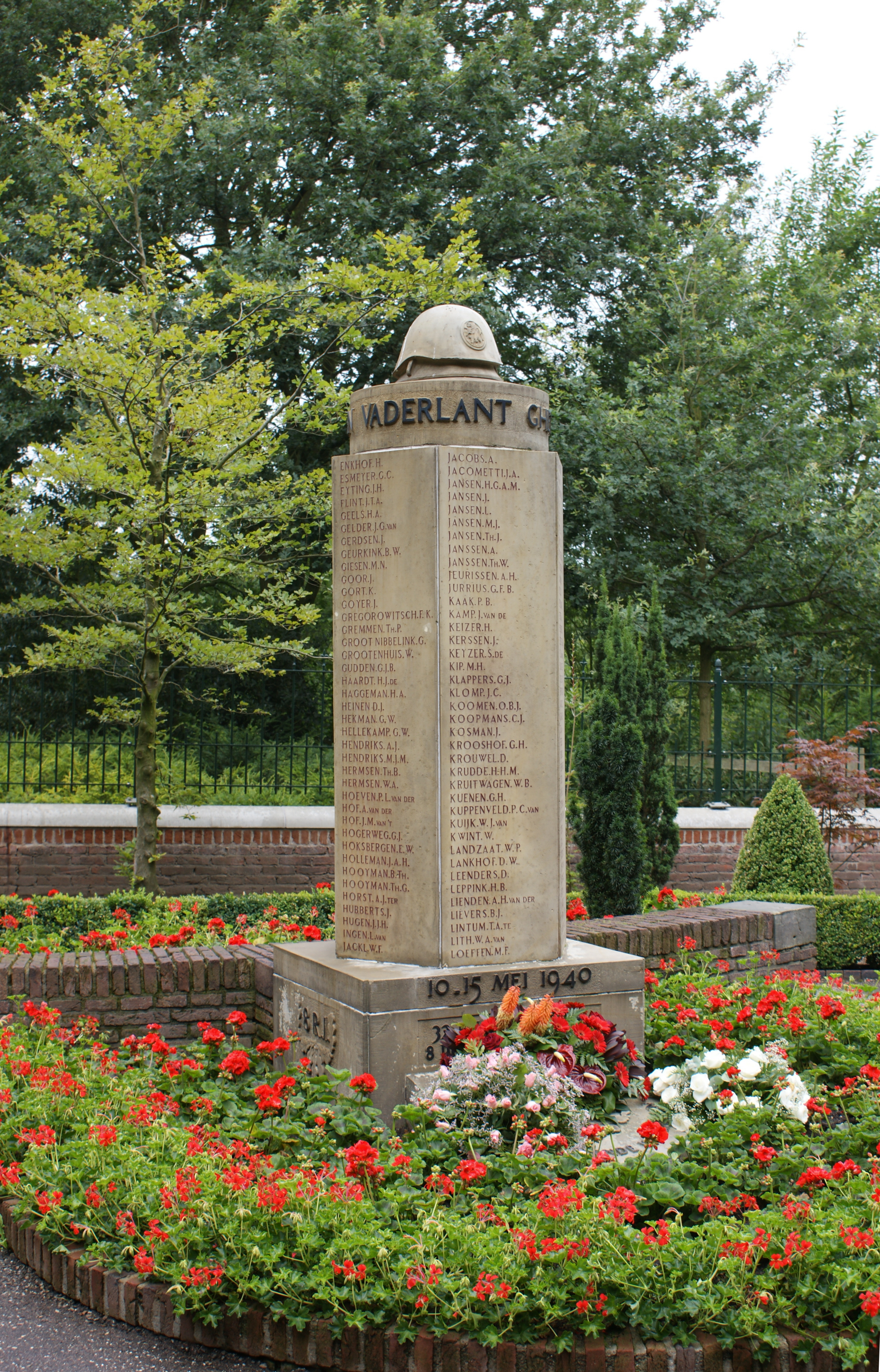
Monument 8th Regiment Infantry

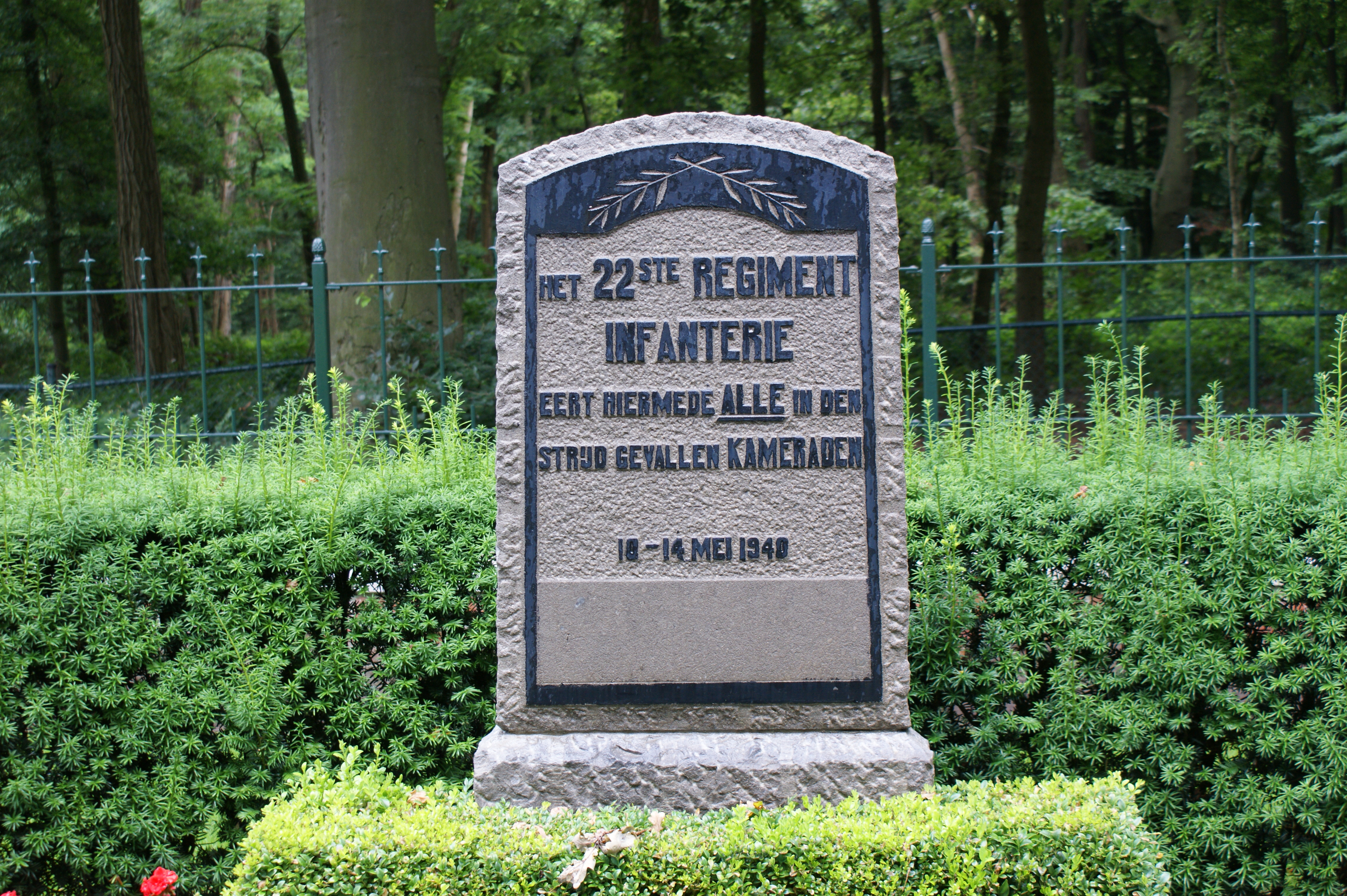
Monument 22nd Regiment Infantry

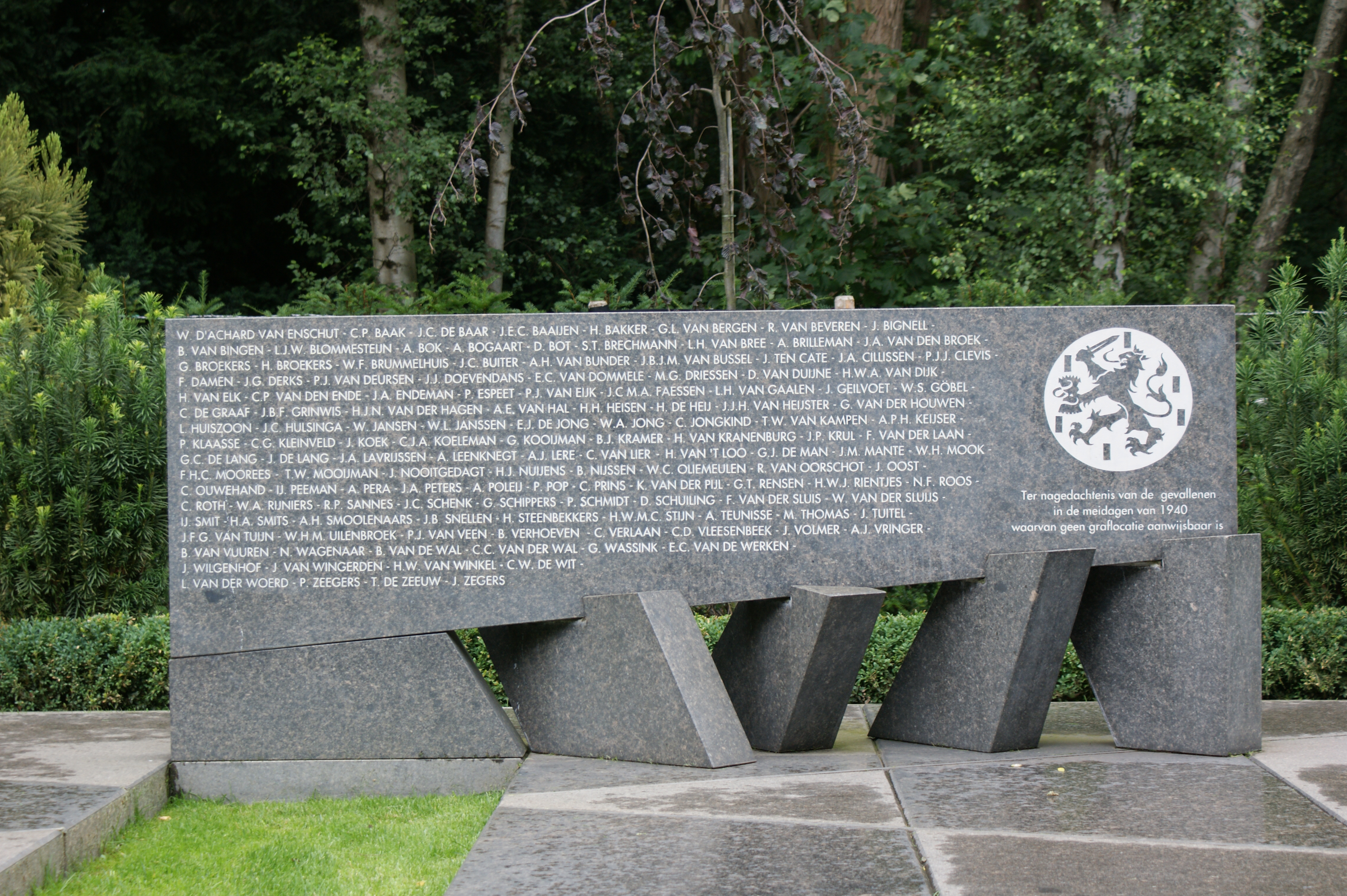
Monument for those missing in action May 1940

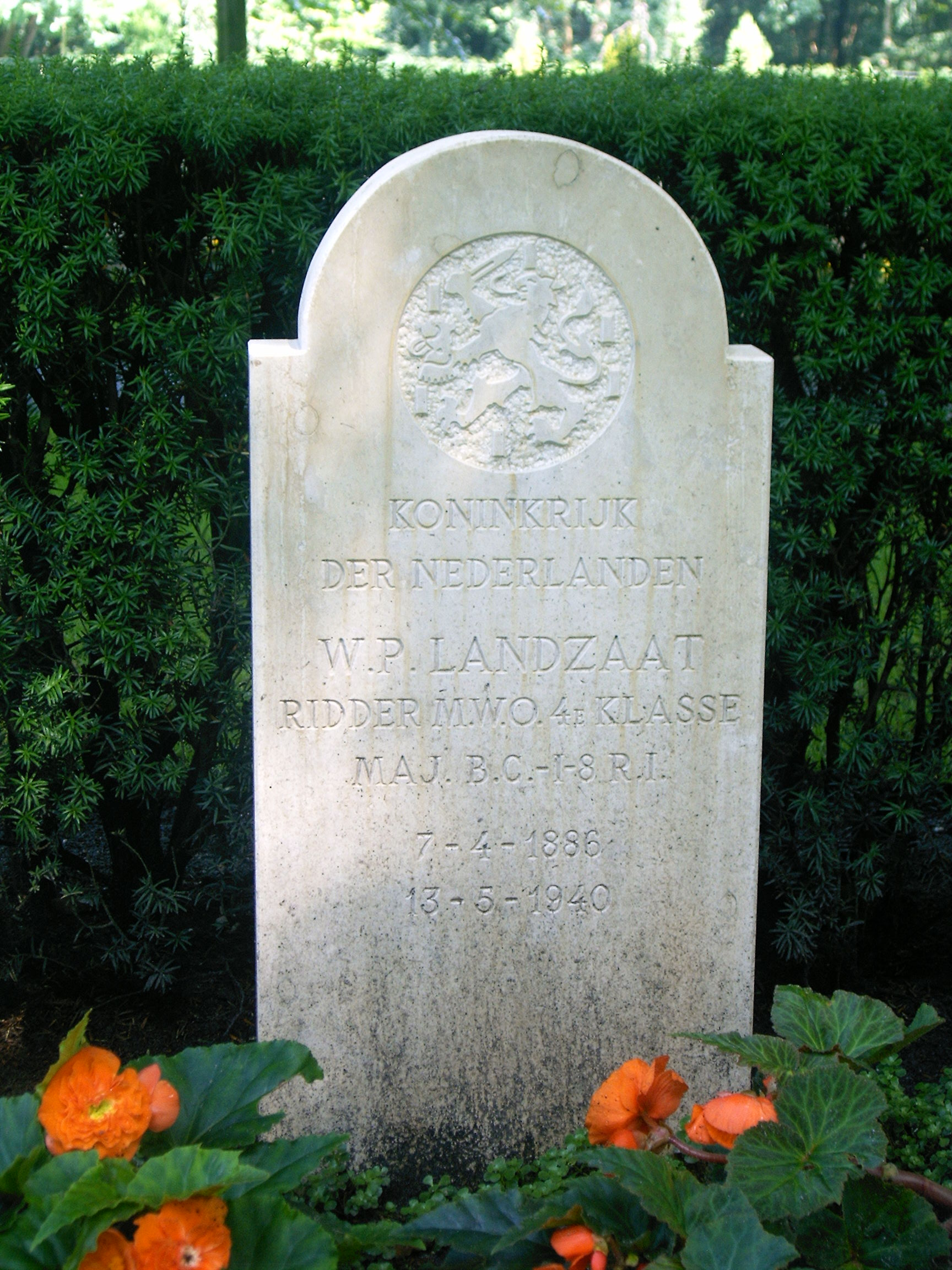
Grave of majoor Landzaat

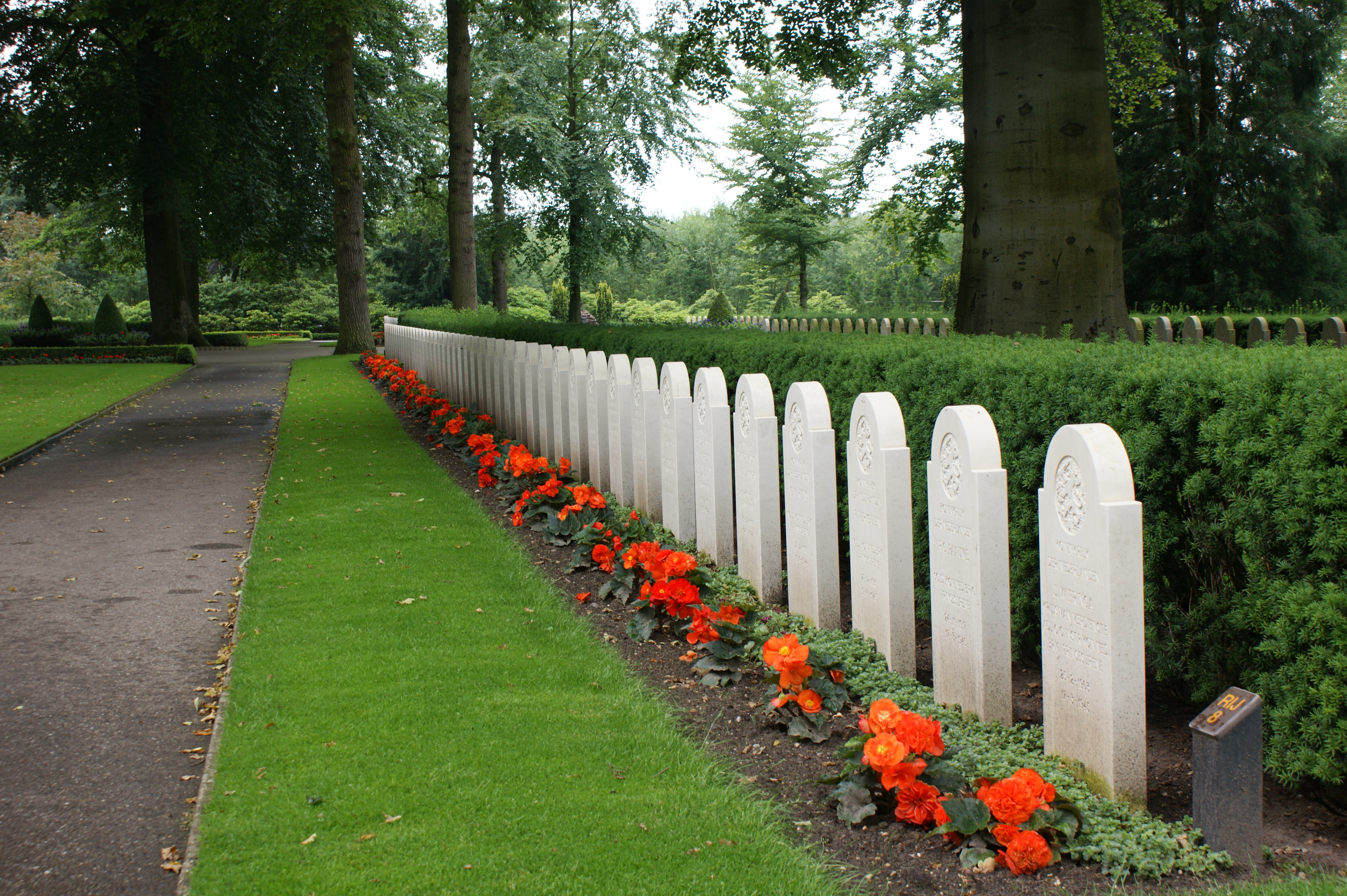
Row of headstones

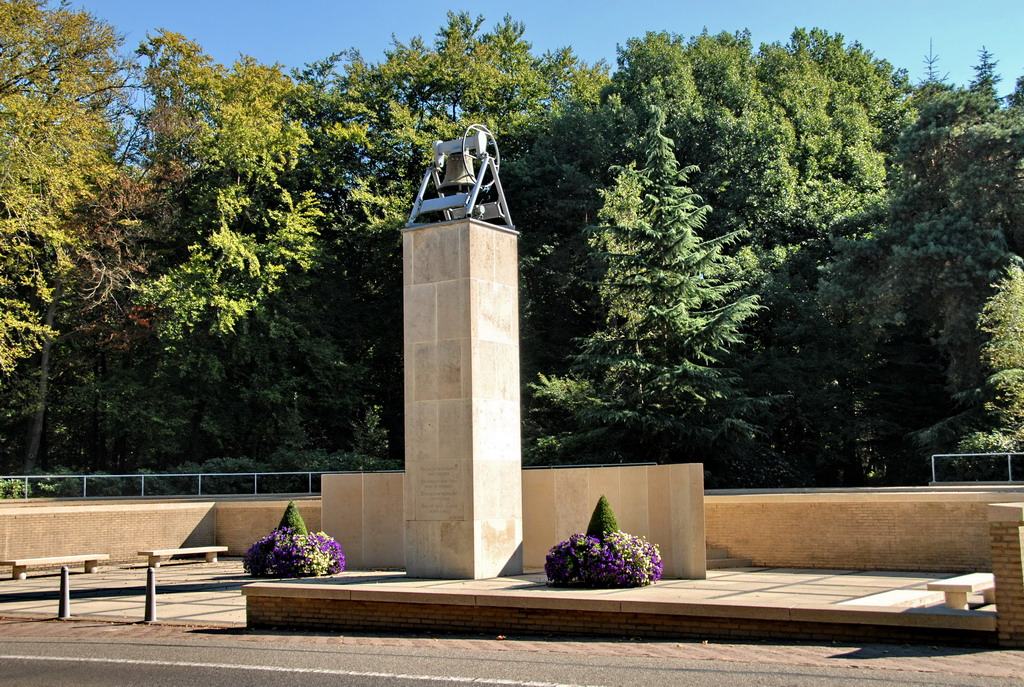
The National Army Monument Grebbeberg cast by the Royal Eijsbouts bell foundry

== Notable burials ==
- Willem Pieter Landzaat, commander 1st battalion 8th Regiment Infantry (I-8 R.I.)
