= Rechteren Castle =

- Kasteel Rechteren
- Dalfsen, the Netherlands
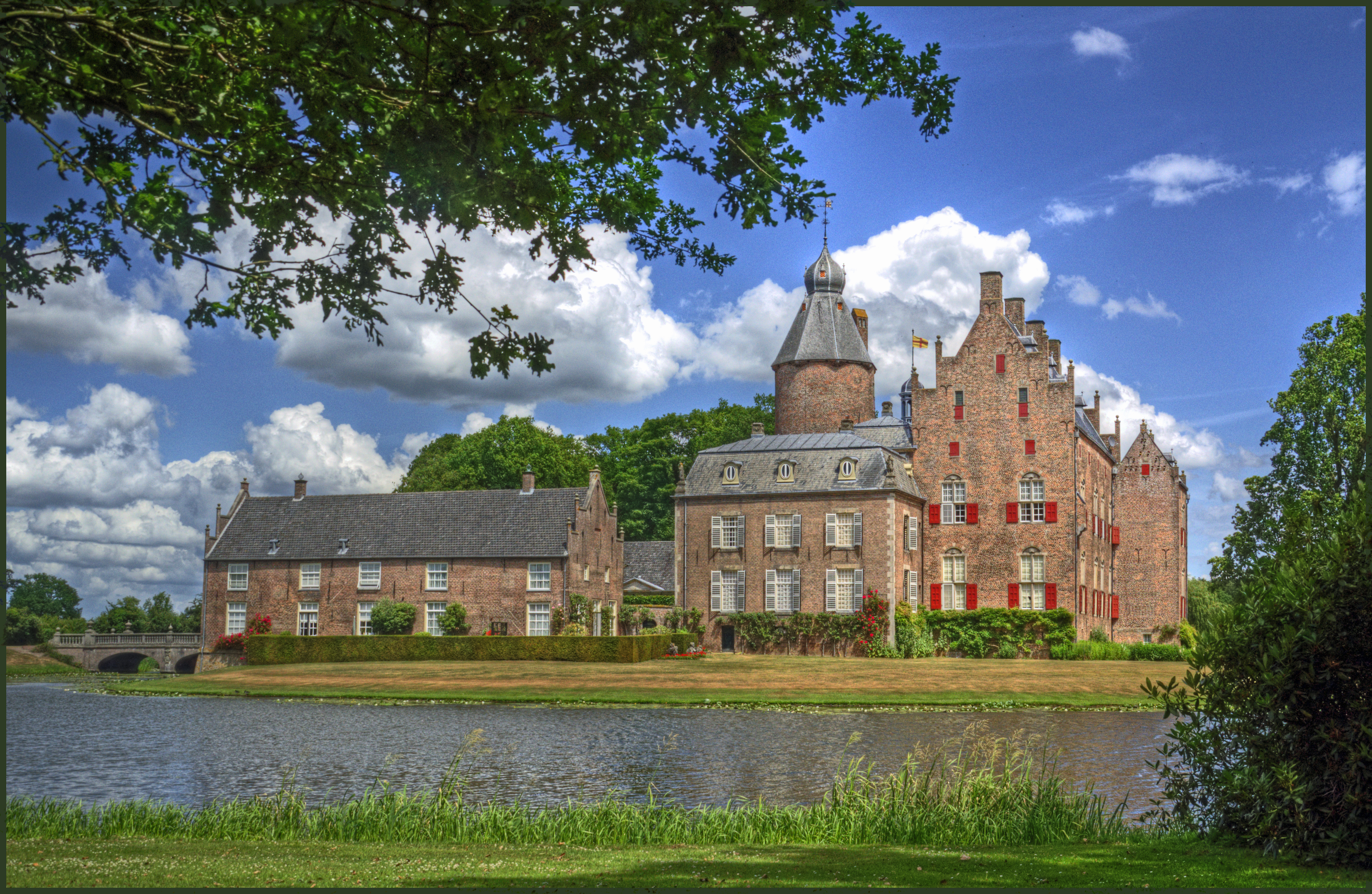
- Rechteren Castle in 2010

Site information
- Type: Castle
- Open to the public: No
- Condition: Good

Location
- The Netherlands
- Coordinates: 52.5°N 6.2667°E

Site history
- Built: 12th century
- Materials: Brick

Rechteren Castle (Dutch: Kasteel Rechteren) is a Dutch castle situated on an island on side-branch of Overijsselse Vecht river, near the village of Dalfsen. It is the only castle in the province Overijssel from the Middle Ages that still exists.

== History ==
Originally, Rechteren Castle was owned by the counts of Bentheim. It is first mentioned in 1190. In 1315, it became the property of Herman van Voorst. Through inheritances, it became property of the van Heeckeren, that split into the van Voorst en van Rechteren family. The counts of Rechteren inherited the castle, and it is nowadays still the family's property. The castle is not open to visitors.
During the Second World War the castle offered shelter to some 60 refugees from Katwijk, Noordwijk and Scheveningen.

== Exterior ==
The castle has been renovated and extended several times throughout the centuries. In 1591, Prince Maurice of Orange requested the owners to dismantle all fortification elements, so that the Spanish troops would not be able to seize an important military stronghold. The surrounding ring wall was torn down, and the main moat was drained. In the 18th century, two wings were added to the main building. In 1896 the main building and the main tower were transformed in neogothic style. In the 1950s, all the neogothic elements were removed, and the 18th century style of the castle was restored.

== Interior ==
In 1908 and 1991, the owners of the castle allowed a photographer to take pictures of the interior. The vestibule contains many family portraits, and there is a white salon designed in rococo style. The dinner room is decorated with paintings by Herman ten Oever, depicting scenes from Greek mythology. The central hall contains portraits and arms of the Rechteren family.

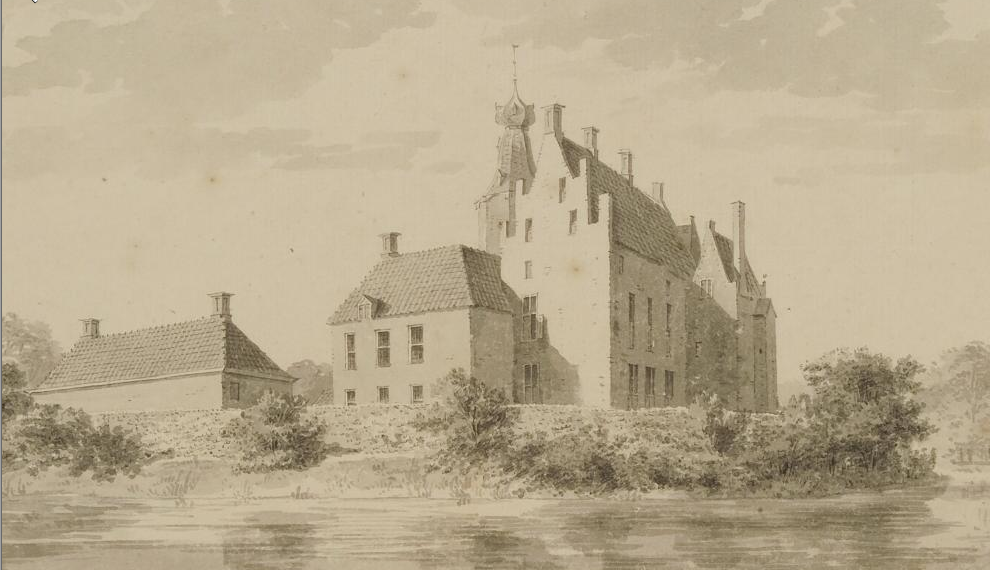
Rechteren in 1729

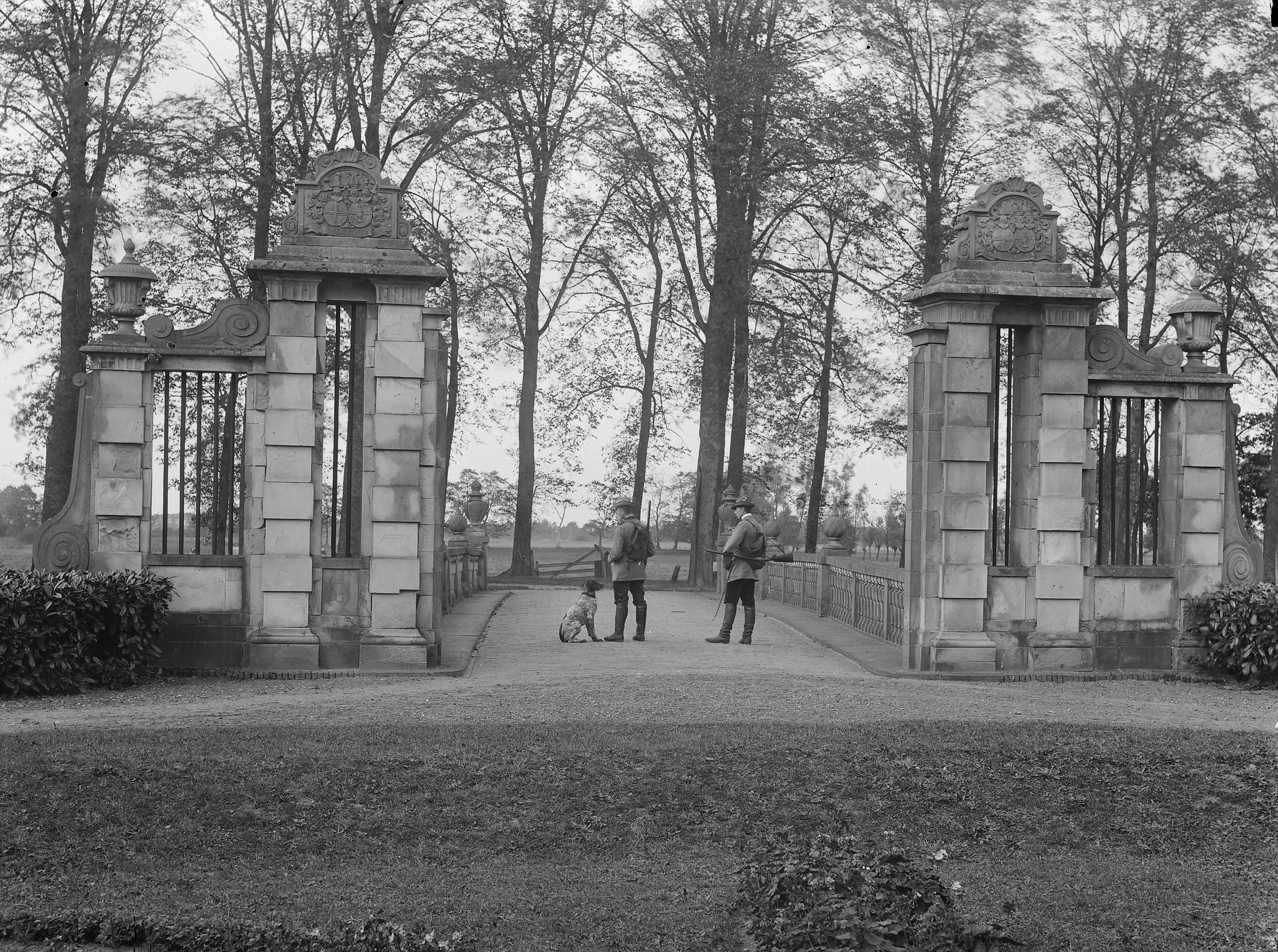
Entrance gate

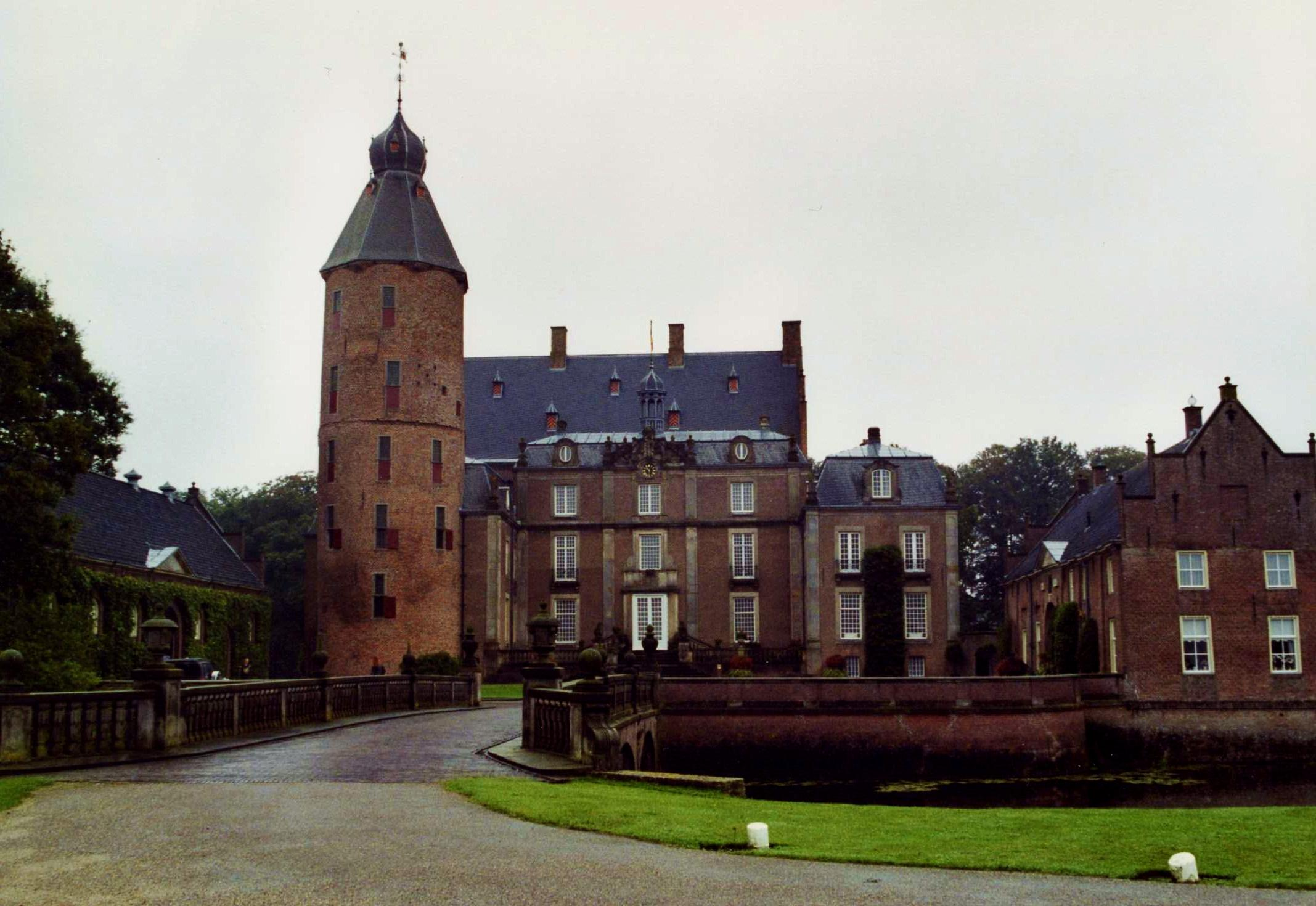
Front view
