= Van Voorst tot Voorst =

Dutch noble family

van Voorst tot Voorst
- Noble family
- Coat of arms
- Country: Netherlands, Belgium
- Founded: 13th century
- Founder: Fredericus van Hekeren van der Ese
- Titles: Baron

The van Voorst tot Voorst family is an old Dutch noble family from the province of Overijssel.

== History ==
The family has been noble since at least the 14th century ("Uradel"). The first documented ancestor is Fredericus van Hekeren van der Ese (in 1327). His son Frederik van Heeckeren van der Eze (1320 – c. 1386) was the head of the Heeckerens faction during the War of the Guelderian Succession. Through his marriage with Lutgardis van Voorst, whose ancestors owned both the castle Rechteren near Dalfsen as well as the castle Voorst near Zwolle, the surname van Voorst entered the family. In 1432, Frederik's grandson, Frederik van Hekeren genaamd van Rechteren († 1462), married Cunegonde van Polanen. Their son, Zeger van Hekeren genaamd van Voorst, became the ancestor of the present-day family van Voorst tot Voorst. Zeger's brother, Otto van Hekeren genaamd van Rechteren († 1478), became the ancestor of the counts of van Rechteren.

During the 19th and 20th century, the family produced several high-ranking officers of the Dutch Army, Commissioners of the Queen, diplomats, as well as members of the House of Representatives and Senate. Members carry the title of baron.

One branch belongs to Belgian nobility: the children from the second marriage of Franciscus baron van Voorst tot Voorst (1884 – 1955) with jkvr. (Belgian: viscountess) Antoinette van Aefferden (1895 – 1976) were incorporated into the Belgian nobility based on a royal decree of 1814.

== Notable members of the family ==
- Jan Joseph Godfried van Voorst tot Voorst (1846–1931), Dutch politician
- Jan Joseph Godfried van Voorst tot Voorst (1880–1963), son of the above, officer of the Dutch armed forces
- Franciscus van Voorst tot Voorst
- Eduardus van Voorst tot Voorst (1874–1945), Dutch sport shooter
- Berend-Jan van Voorst tot Voorst (1944–2023), Dutch politician and diplomat
- Herman van Voorst tot Voorst (1886–1971), Dutch Army officer and politician

== Coat of arms ==
The coat of arms consists of three red chevrons on a field of gold. This coat of arms is depicted in the medieval Gelre Armorial (folio 88v).

== Gallery ==
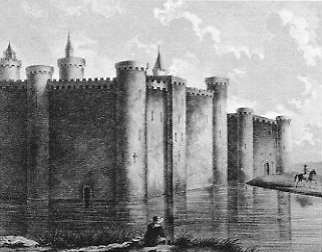
Impressionist painting of the Medieval Castle Voorst near Zwolle, painted by W.J. Hofdijk (circa 1840)

Coat of arms as depicted in the Gelre Armorial

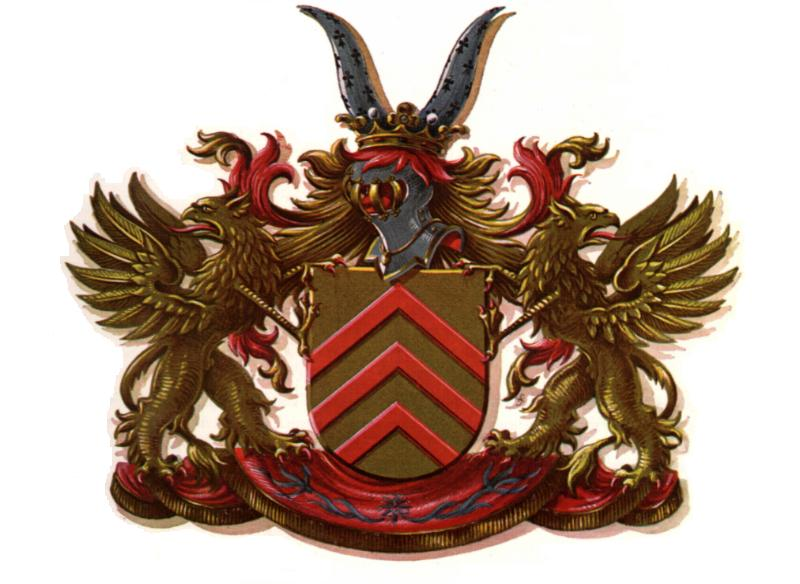
Coat of arms

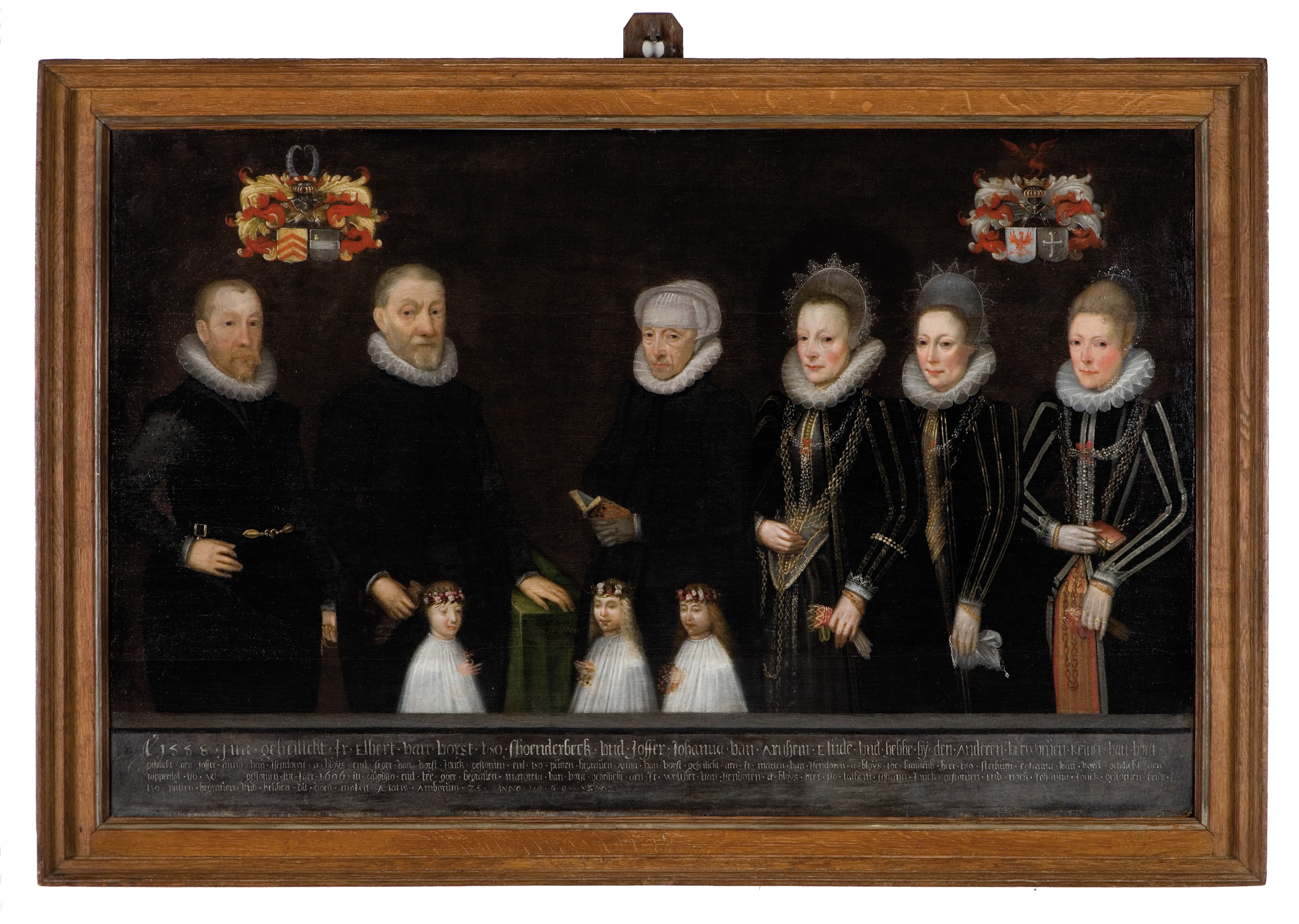
Portrait of Elbert van Voorst and his family

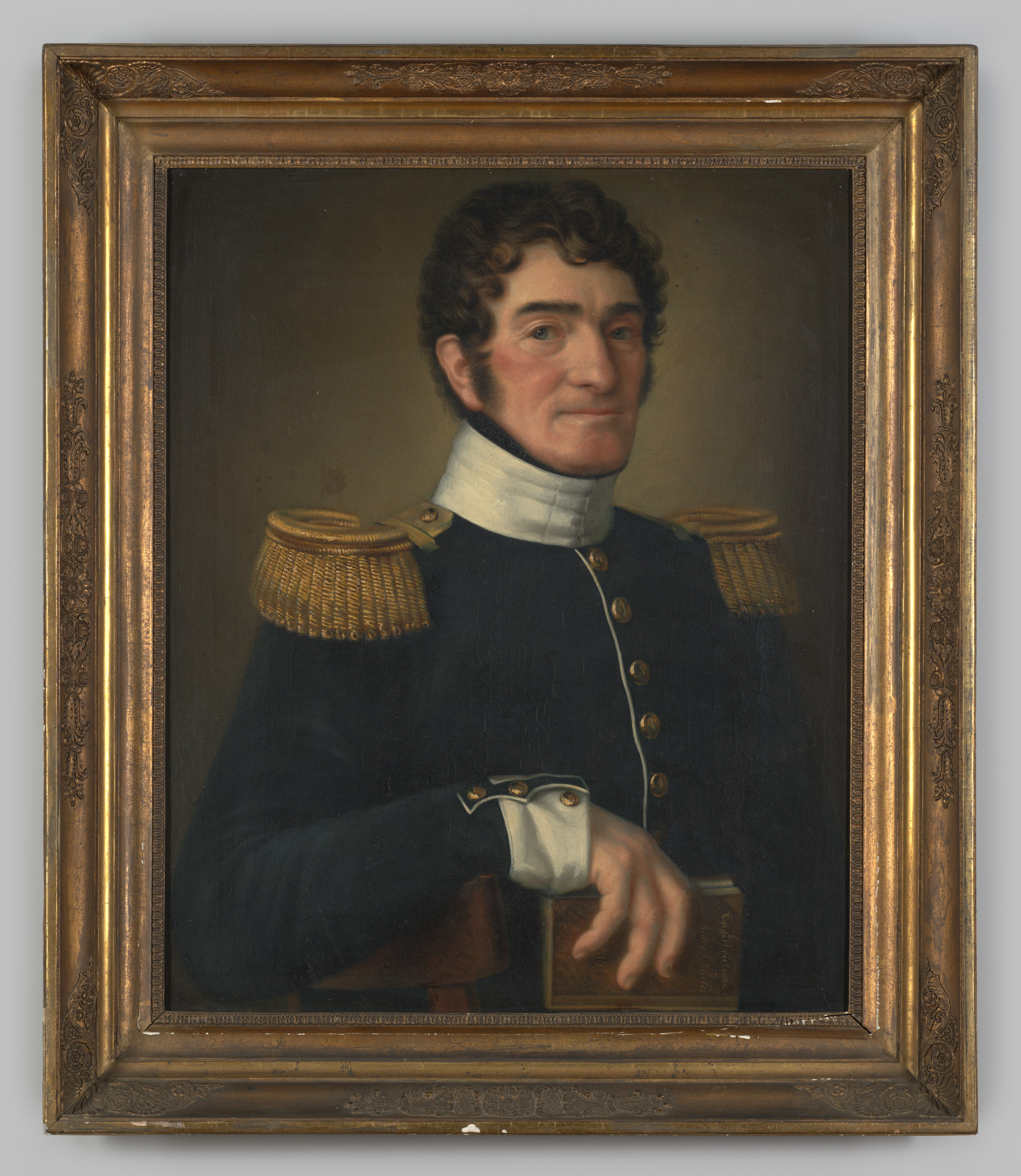
Major-General Joseph baron van Voorst tot Voorst (1767–1841)

== Literature ==
- A.F.H. van Heeckeren, 'Genealogie van de geslachten Van Voorst, Van Heeckeren, Van Rechteren' in: Heraldieke Bibliotheek (1876).
- E.L. van Voorst tot Voorst, 'Het Boek der Voorsten: Het geslacht van Voorst tot Voorst, uit officieele bronnen toegelicht' ('s-Gravehage, 1892).
- J.J. Hooft van Huysduynen, 'Bijdrage tot een genealogie van het geslacht Van Voorst tot Voorst' ('s-Gravenhage, 1968).
- J.G.N. Renaud et al., 'Het kasteel Voorst- Macht en val van een Overijsselse burcht' (Zwolle, 1983).
- * Mensema, A.J., Raat, R.M. de, Woude, C.C. van der, Inventaris van het huisarchief Almelo, 3 volumes, 1236 - 1917 (1933), Zwolle (1993). online version including family tree of early generations of the Van der Eze, Van Heeckeren, Van Rechteren en Van Voorst family.
- Nederland's Adelsboek 96 (2011), p. 263-357.
- Etat présent de la noblesse belge (2014), p. 282-284.
- Detlev Schwennicke, Europäische Stammtafeln Band XXVII (2012) Tafel 94–95.

== See also ==
- Voorst, a present-day municipality in Gelderland. In 1362, the castle Voorst was besieged by Prince-Bishop John of Arkel.
