= Van Rechteren =

van Rechteren
- Mediatized Noble German House
- Coat of arms of the Rechteren family (1814)
- Country: Netherlands; Germany
- Founded: 13th century
- Founder: Fredericus van Hekeren van der Ese
- Titles: count

Original coat of arms of the family

The House of Rechteren (Dutch: Van Rechteren Limpurg) is old European noble family belonging to the Dutch and German nobility. The German branch of Counts von Rechteren-Limpurg-Speckfeld has been mediatised and as such, the family belonged to high nobility.

== History ==
The family was already noble from earliest times ("Uradel"). The first documented ancestor is Fredericus van Hekeren van der Ese (mentioned 1295) who was an adviser to Reginald II of Guelders. His grandson Frederik van Heeckeren van der Eze (1320-ca. 1386) was the head of the Heeckerens faction during the War of the Guelderian Succession. Through his marriage with 'Lutgardis van Voorst, whose ancestors owned both the castle Rechteren near Dalfsen as well as the castle Voorst near Zwolle, the surname van Rechteren entered the family. In 1432, Frederik's grandson, Frederik van Hekeren genaamd van Rechteren († 1462) married Cunegonde van Polanen. Their son Otto van Hekeren genaamd van Rechteren († 1478) inherited Castle Rechteren and became the ancestor of the counts of Rechteren. Otto's brother, Zeger van Hekeren genaamd van Voorst, became the ancestor of the present-day barons van Voorst tot Voorst. The van Heeckeren family is related to both families.

In 1705, Joachim Heinrich Adolf van Rechteren was granted by Emperor Joseph I. the Imperial Count. His son, Johann Eberhard Adolf (1714-1754), inherited from his mother, Countess Amalie zu Limpurg-Speckfeld, the county of Limpurg-Speckfeld. In 1806 the branch of Rechteren-Limpurg-Speckfeld was mediatised. The German branch of the Counts Rechteren-Limpurg-Speckfeld died out in 1995. Icho Baron von und zu Massenbach (1908-1995) adopted the surname of his mother, Luitgard Countess von Rechteren-Limpurg-Speckfeld (1910-1960), and added the Rechteren family name to his, becoming thus von Rechteren-Limpurg-Speckfeld von und zu Massenbach in Germany.

Castle Rechteren in Dalfsen became a property of Herman van Voorst, ancestor of the Rechteren family, in 1315. and it is still owned by the family. The family also owns Huize Almelo and the Enghuizen estate in the Netherlands.

== Coat of arms ==
Shield: in gold a red cross. The Rechteren coat of arms is depicted in the medieval Gelre Armorial (folio 101v).

Coat of Arms of 1814

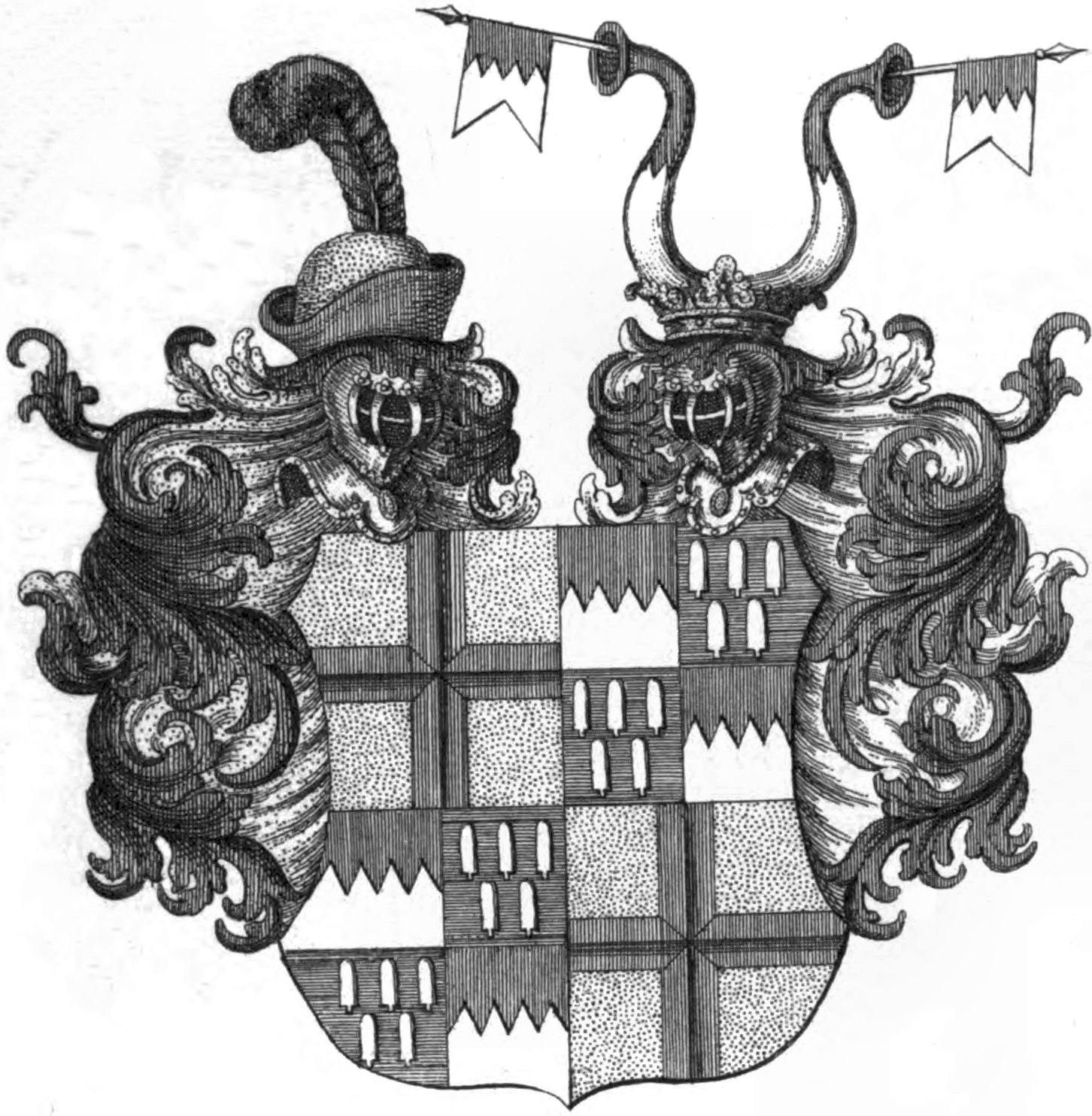
Arms of the Count of Rechteren (1706)

== Gallery ==
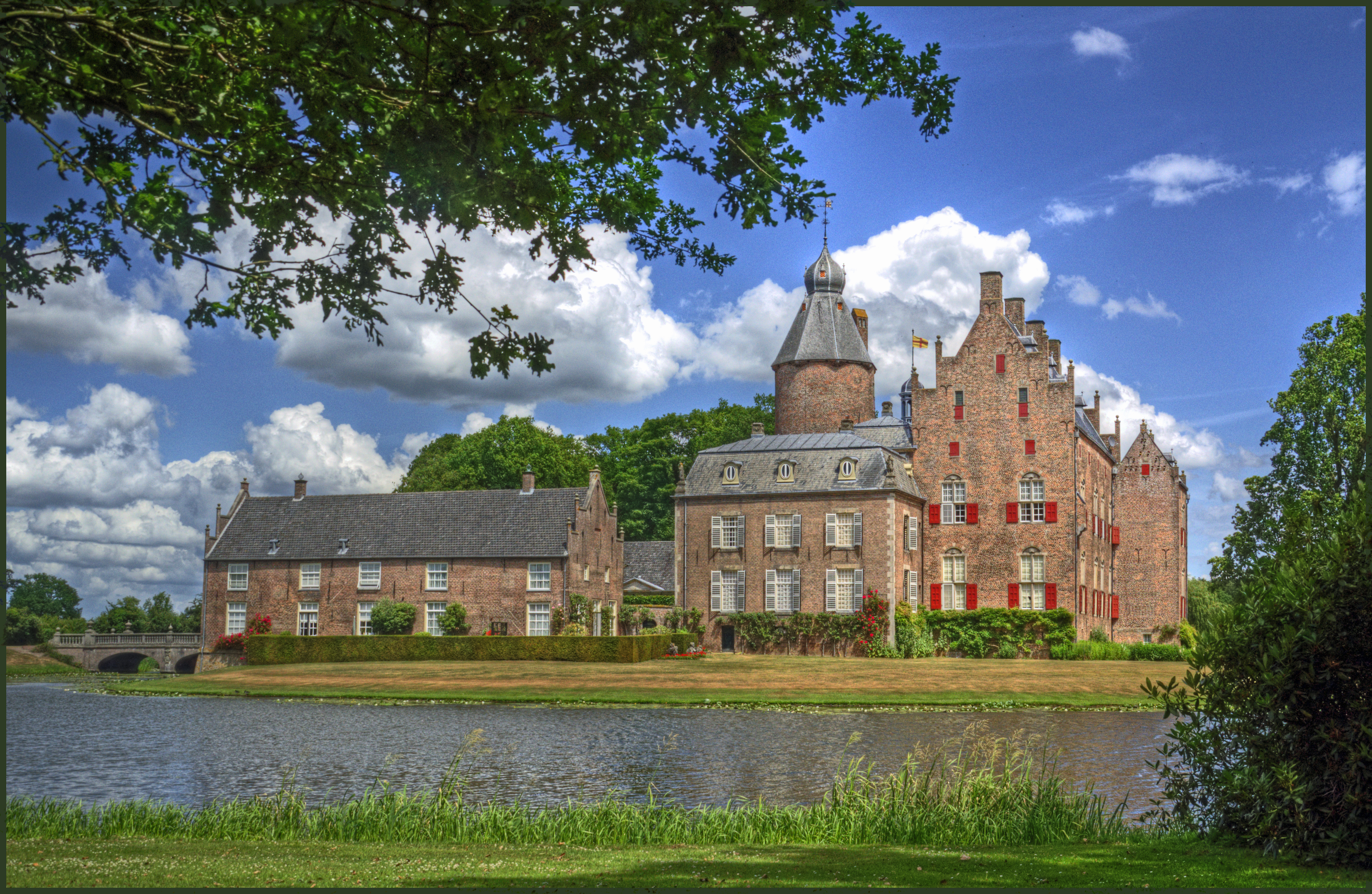
The Castle Rechteren in Dalfsen has been in the Rechteren family since 1315.

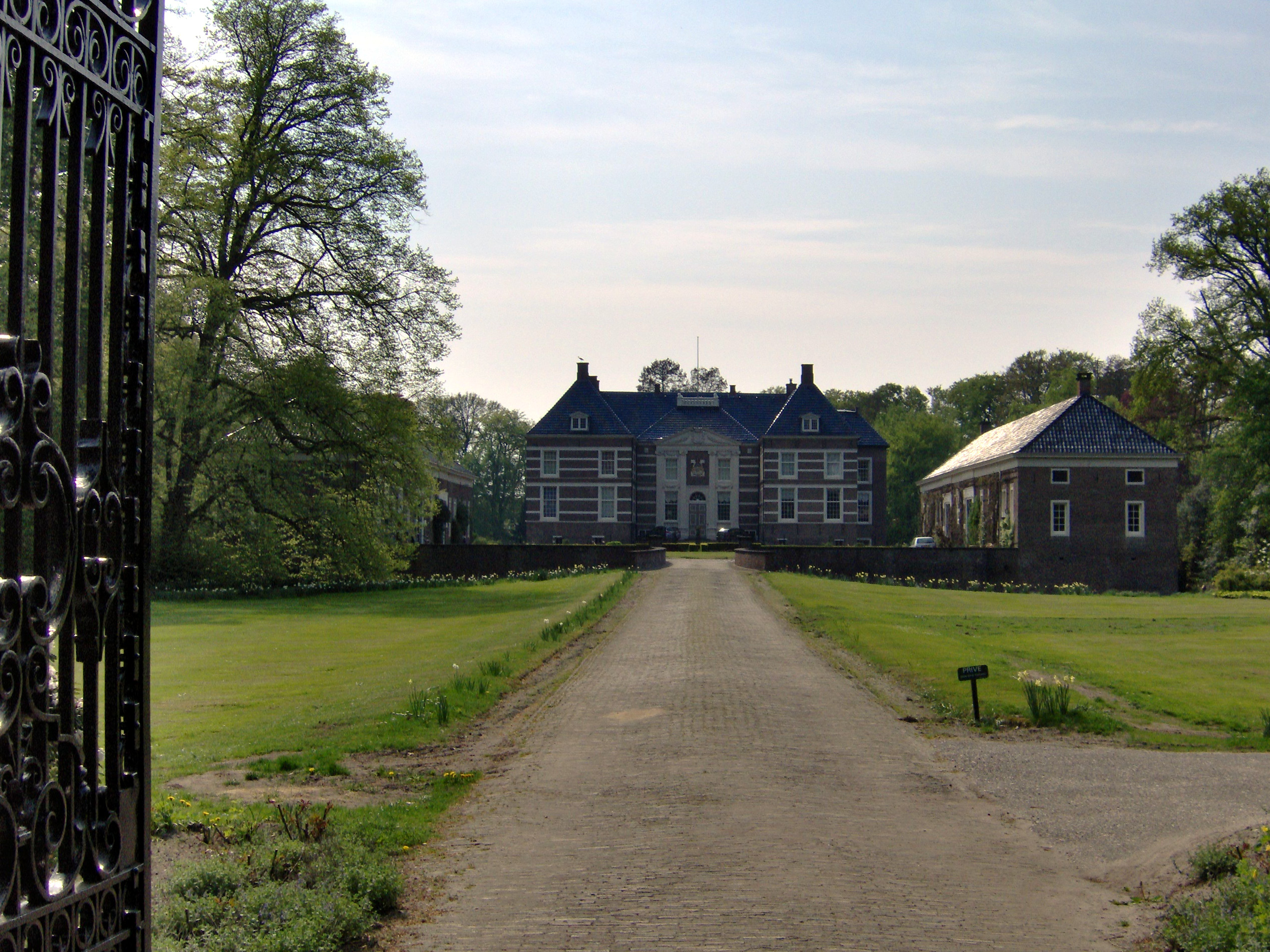
Huize Almelo

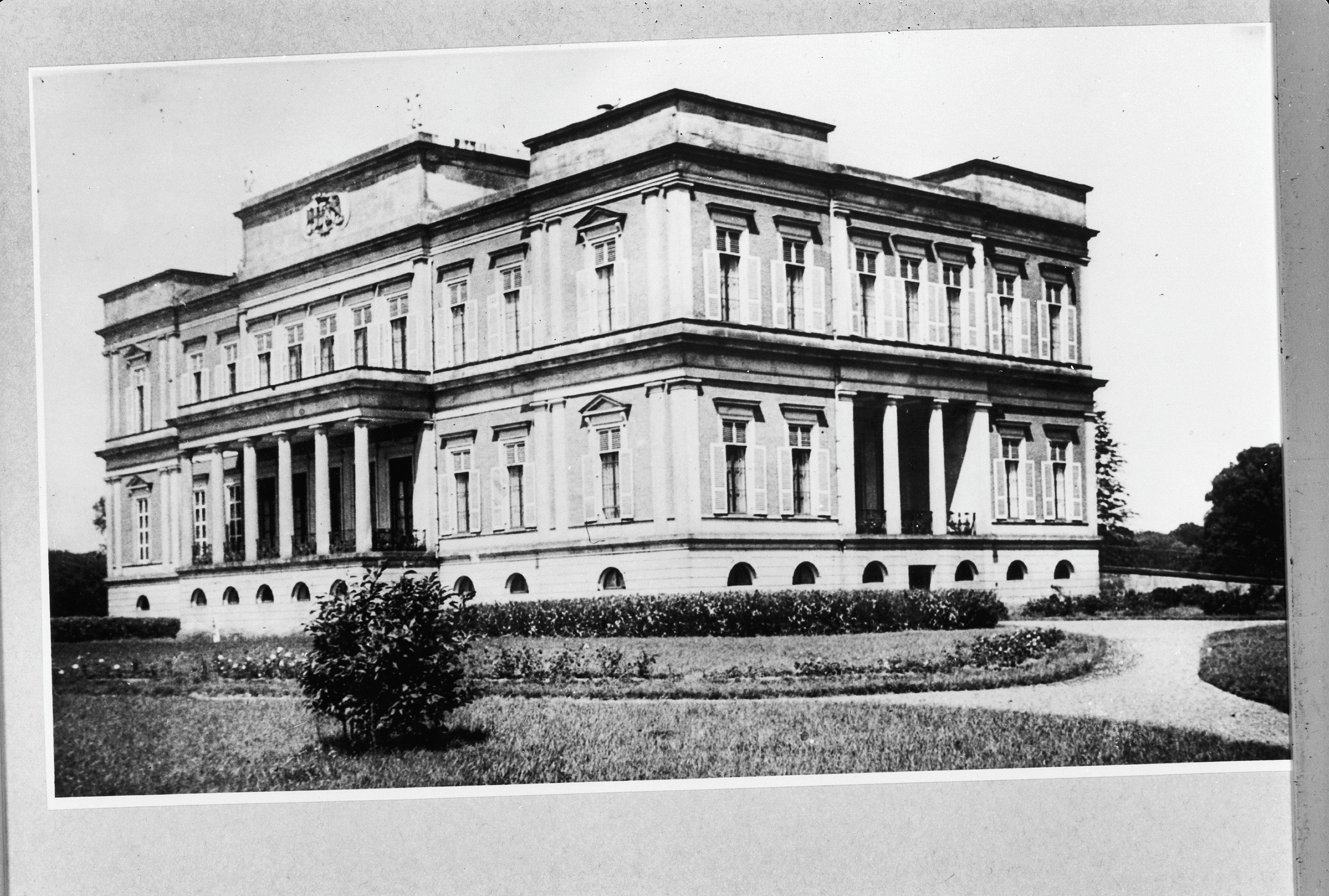
The Enghuizen estate in Hummelo before being bombed in 1945.

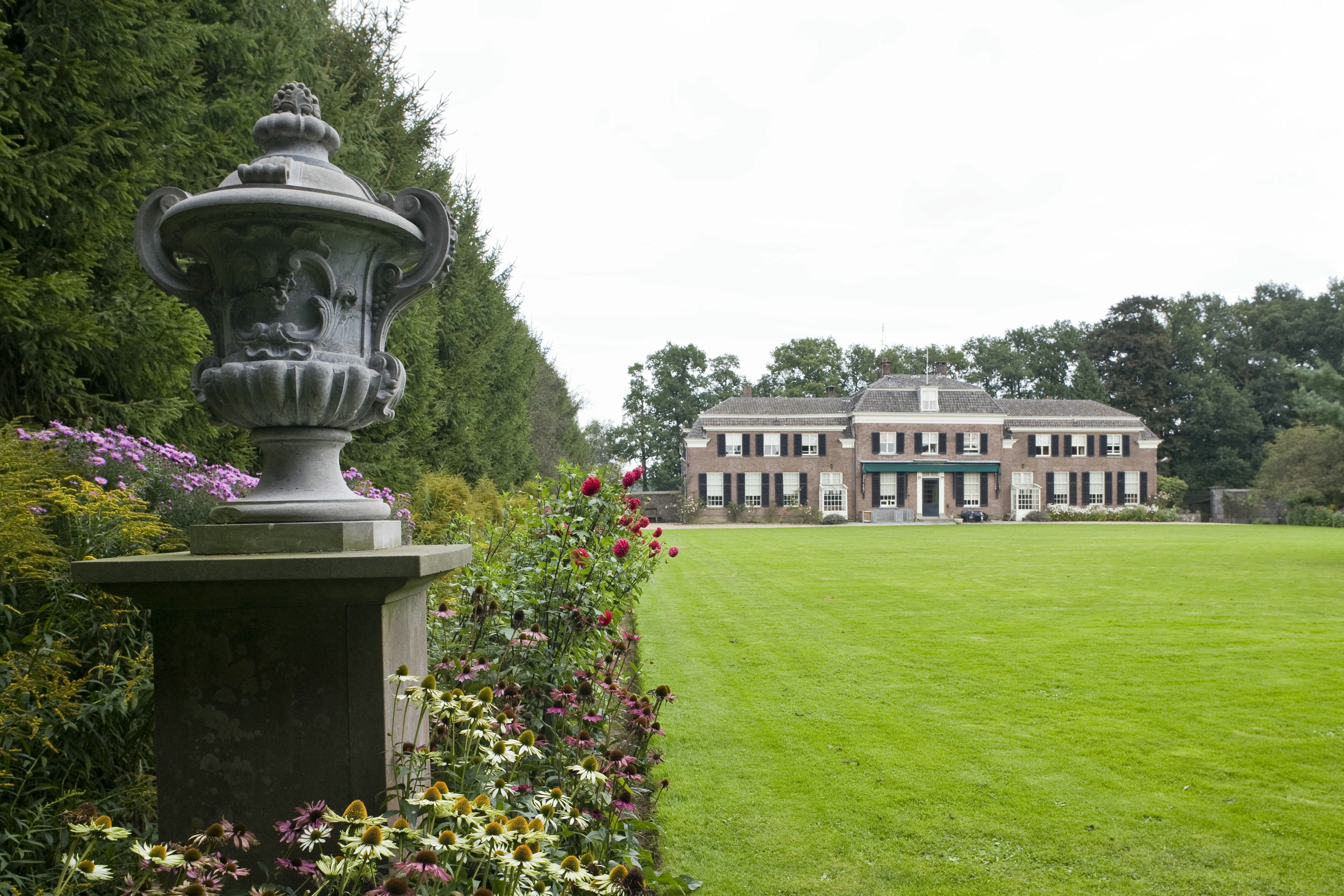
The converted orangerie on the Enghuizen estate.

== Literature ==
- Dr. D.P.M. Graswinckel and Mr. H. Hardenberg, 'Het Archief van het Kasteel Rechteren' (Zaltbommel, 1941).
- A.F.H. van Heeckeren,'Genealogie van de geslachten Van Voorst, Van Heeckeren, Van Rechteren' in: Heraldieke Bibliotheek (1876).
- Prof. Dr. J.G.N. Renaud et al., 'Het kasteel Voorst- Macht en val van een Overijsselse burcht' (Zwolle, 1983).
- J. P h. de Monté Verloren, 'Het wapen en de graventitel van den Nederlandschen tak van het geslacht van Rechteren Limpurg', in: De Nederlandsche Leeuw 57 (1939), k. 166–168.
- Mensema, A.J., Raat, R.M. de, Woude, C.C. van der, Inventaris van het huisarchief Almelo, 3 volumes, 1236 - 1917 (1933), Zwolle (1993). online version including family tree of early generations of the Van der Eze, Van Heeckeren, Van Rechteren en Van Voorst family.
- Nederland's Adelsboek 91 (2004-2005), p. 1-48.
- Genealogisches Handbuch des Adels 149 (2011), p. 309-313.
- Detlev Schwennicke, Europäische Stammtafeln Band XXVII (2012) Tafel 94–95.
