= Herman van Voorst tot Voorst =

Herman baron van Voorst tot Voorst
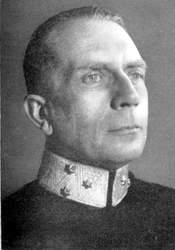
- Born: 2 August 1886; The Hague
- Died: 9 July 1971 (aged 84)
- Relatives: Jan Joseph Godfried van Voorst tot Voorst Senior
- Military career
- Allegiance: Dutch
- Rank: Lt. Gen.
- Commands: Chief of the General Staff
- Other work: Chief Commissioner of the De Verkenners van de Katholieke Jeugdbeweging

Lt. Gen. Herman Franciscus Maria baron van Voorst tot Voorst (The Hague, 2 August 1886 - 9 July 1971) was a Dutch Army officer and politician.

He was the son of Jan Joseph Godfried van Voorst tot Voorst Senior, and a younger brother of General Godfried van Voorst tot Voorst. In 1915, he married Felicia Maria baroness Schimmelpenninck van der Oye (1889-1952). He attended the Royal Military Academy in Breda and The Hague as well as the Saumur Cavalry School in France. Baron van Voorst tot Voorst was appointed in February 1940 as Chief of the General Staff, under the Supreme Commander of the Land and Naval Forces, General Henri Winkelman. He was, like his brother, brought as a prisoner of war to Germany. After World War II he was member of the Senate from 1946 to 1949 and member of the Council of State from 1949 to 1961.

Van Voorst tot Voorst served as the Chief Commissioner of the De Verkenners van de Katholieke Jeugdbeweging "Scouts of the Catholic Youth Movement", the Dutch Catholic Scouting organization for boys, from 1946 to 1956, as well as a member of the International Scout Committee. In 1957, van Voorst tot Voorst was awarded the 18th Bronze Wolf, the only distinction of the World Organization of the Scout Movement, awarded by the World Scout Committee for exceptional services to world Scouting.

== Awards ==
- Netherlands: Knight of the Order of the Netherlands Lion
- Netherlands: Commander of the Order of Orange-Nassau

== See also ==
- Van Voorst tot Voorst
