= Battle of the Grebbeberg =

Major engagement during the Battle of the Netherlands in WWII

- Part of Battle of the Netherlands
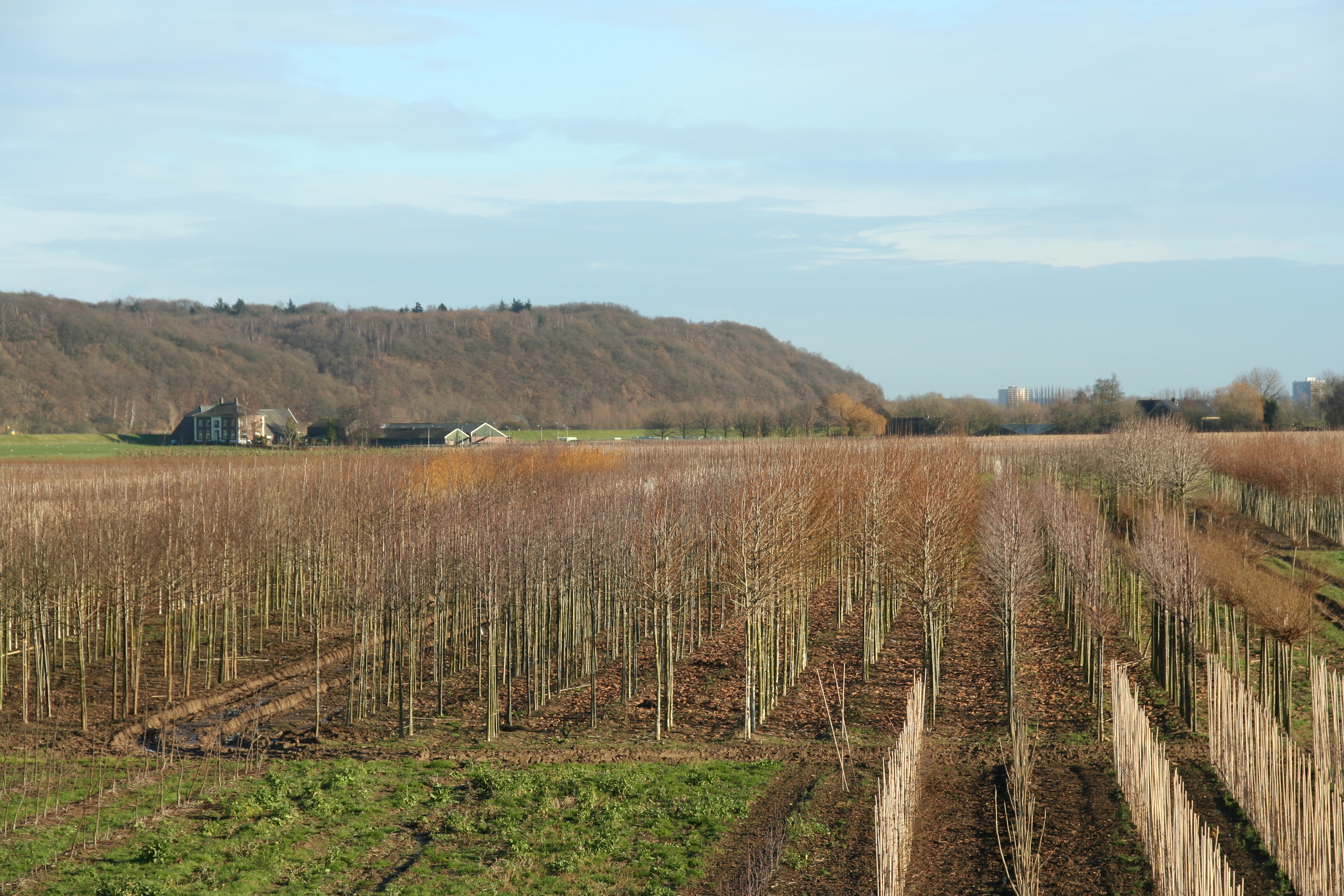
- The Grebbeberg, seen from the south
Date	11–13 May 1940
Location	Grebbeberg, Rhenen, Netherlands 51.954°N 5.600°E
Result	German victory

Belligerents
Netherlands	(Nazi Germany) Germany

Commanders and leaders
(Netherlands) Godfried van Voorst tot Voorst (Field Army) (Netherlands) Jacob Harberts (2nd Corps) (Netherlands) Antonie Marinus Michiel van Loon (4th Division)	(Nazi Germany) Karl von Tiedemann

Units involved
(Netherlands) II Corps: 4th Infantry Division; Brigade B	(Nazi Germany) 18th Army: 207th Infantry Division; SS-brigade Der Führer

Strength
15,000; 88 field guns 6 anti-tank guns 4 AA guns 5 fighters 4 light bombers	23,000; 58 field guns

Casualties and losses
417 killed	275 killed

The Battle of the Grebbeberg (Dutch: Slag om de Grebbeberg) was a major engagement during the Battle of the Netherlands, which was a part of the World War II Operation Fall Gelb in 1940.

== Background ==
In the 1930s, the Dutch government pursued a policy of strict neutrality. After World War I, the Dutch parliament supported a disarmament policy because it was generally thought that World War I had been "the war to end all wars". When the threat of Nazi Germany became more apparent the Dutch government decided to reinforce and retrain its Armed Forces.

=== General defensive strategy ===
In the 1930s the general defensive strategy was aimed at an attack by Germany. In that case the army should fall back on the Water Line, which formed part of Fortress Holland, the Dutch national redoubt. It was expected that assistance would then arrive from France and the United Kingdom. To defend the redoubt, it was necessary to slow the German advance in order to give as many Dutch forces as possible the chance of assembling in Fortress Holland.

To this effect, several defensive lines had been constructed throughout the country. The Maas Line and the IJssel Line had been constructed along the Maas and IJssel rivers and served to detect German incursions into Dutch territory and to delay the Germans in the first hours of an invasion. The fortress at Kornwerderzand on the narrow Afsluitdijk guarded the northern approach to Fortress Holland while the Peel-Raam Line in North Brabant guarded the southern approach. Any attempt to approach Fortress Holland through the central part of the country would be delayed at the Grebbe line.

At the beginning of 1940, Chief of Staff General Henri Winkelman redesignated the Grebbe Line the Main Defence Line, because defending the East Front of Fortress Holland would bring the major city of Utrecht into the frontline and the enemy too close to the Dutch capital Amsterdam.

=== The Grebbe Line ===
The Grebbe Line was built in 1745 and had been used for the first time in 1794 against the French. It was maintained throughout the 19th century, but had been neglected ever since because it was thought to have become obsolete. In 1926, most fortifications were disbanded. When Germany became a potential threat the Dutch government had the Line recommissioned.

At the end of the 1930s, a series of pillboxes and casemates were constructed in the area south of the IJsselmeer and north of the Rhine. The Line was constructed according to French military principles from World War I which had proven to be successful then, but had, unknown at the time of construction, become obsolete. There were major flaws in the design of the pillboxes, which were difficult to defend against attack from the flanks and rear. The (fixed) weapons were antiquated, many of them dating back to World War I. Because the Dutch government did not want to antagonise local residents, permission to remove buildings and trees in the line of fire was refused, which greatly reduced the effectiveness of the defences and gave attackers plenty of cover. The trench system was also based on World War I principles. It consisted of a line of outposts (voorpostenlijn), a Frontline (frontlijn), a Stopline (stoplijn) and a Final Line (ruglijn).

The position at the Grebbeberg suffered from a lack of serious security measures. The government did not want to interrupt tourism as the local economy of Rhenen was dependent on revenues from the Ouwehands Dierenpark, a zoo located on a hill near Rhenen, the Grebbeberg. In the months leading up to the invasion, German officers in civilian clothes visited the zoo and used its lookout tower to survey the local defences. The government estimated that the Line would be completed in November 1940 and in May 1940 the bomb-proof pumping station at the Grebbeberg—which was necessary for the control of local flooding—had not been completed. Because of the lack of inundation, the German spies realised that the Grebbeberg would be a vulnerable spot in the Grebbe Line.

=== The opposing forces ===
The Grebbeberg was defended by the 8th Infantry Regiment (8 RI), Lieutenant Colonel Hennink. It was supported by a battalion of 19 RI. The defending units were part of the 4th division, Colonel van Loon. The 4th and 2nd division formed the 2nd army corps under Major General J. Harberts. On the Grebbeberg itself were 3 batteries of the 8th Artillery Regiment (8 RA), and three from the new 19 RA. Those of 8 RA were 1-I-8 RA and 2-I-8 RA armed with the 7 veld, and 2-III-8 RA with the 15 cm L/17 howitzer. Those of 19 RA were the three batteries of II-19 RA armed with the antique 12 cm Lang staal.

The German forces were the 207th Infantry Division (17,500 men) and the SS-Standarte Der Führer (c. 6,000 men). The 207th Infantry Division was a reserve unit that had only minimal combat experience. The SS was certainly elite, but its soldiers did not have any combat experience. These units were supported by about 50 guns.

== The battle ==
At 03:55 local time on 10 May 1940, the German Army Group B invaded the Netherlands. The 207th Infantry Division—commanded by Karl von Tiedemann—and part of the 18th Army had been tasked with overrunning the Grebbeberg within a day. Resistance at the IJssel Line near Westervoort was fiercer than anticipated and it was dusk by the time the Germans had occupied Wageningen, the city directly to the east of the Grebbeberg. The 207th Infantry Division—reinforced with the SS-brigade Der Führer—made preparations to assault the hill next morning.

=== 11 May ===
==== The outposts fall ====
In order to mount a direct assault on the Grebbeberg, the Germans had to breach the line of outposts (voorpostenlijn) which covered a 3 km (1.9 mi) wide area directly in front of the Grebbeberg, which had not been flooded. The line was manned by two companies of the third battalion of the 8th Infantry Regiment (III-8 RI), which was part of the 4th Division and the 2nd Corps. In the early hours of 11 May, German artillery opened fire on the line of outposts, disabling the telephone system of the Dutch defenders. Now that communication with the other defensive lines had become impossible, the Dutch were deprived of artillery support. At dawn, the SS brigade launched a direct assault on the outposts. The defensive positions at the outposts were mostly improvised and consisted of sandbags and wooden obstacles. The field of fire of the Dutch defensive positions did not overlap. German forces were able to neutralise them one by one by sending two teams of machine gunners to attack a single position. One team would provide covering fire while the other would use the blind spots to launch a flanking attack.

In the northern part of the line, on the edge of the inundated area, the Germans ran into a section of the Dutch 19th Infantry Regiment (19 RI), which—because it was part of a different unit—had trouble co-ordinating its actions with the other Dutch positions. This section broke after a short skirmish and retreated westward, thereby creating an open flank which the Germans exploited by encircling the more southern Dutch sections. Near the Rhine the Germans used a dike to approach defending forces from the rear unhindered. Dutch supporting fire from the Frontline was largely ineffective because the area between the frontline and the line of outposts was carpeted in orchards, which kept the Germans out of sight. Now that the SS forces had succeeded in approaching the Dutch forces from the rear, the line of outposts could be neutralised. At 18:00, the last Dutch section surrendered and the voorpostenlijn fell into German hands.

==== The Dutch counterattack ====
In the evening, German armored cars tried to attack the hill itself but were repelled by a 47 mm (1.85 in) anti-tank gun. That evening, Chris Meijer—an artillery sergeant who had been arrested for abandoning his post—was brought in and subjected to a court-martial and executed by firing squad. After the war, this court-martial would become controversial because of possible undue influence by the commander of 2nd Corps, General Harberts. This incident—and unfounded rumors of a massive rout in the line of outposts—incited Harberts into setting an example for other Dutch forces. At 21:00, he ordered the second battalion of 19 RI to initiate a counterattack under the cover of darkness against the outposts. Harberts estimated that about a hundred Germans were in the line of outposts, but in reality II-19 RI faced 3,000 SS troops. At the stopline, which was situated directly on the Grebbeberg, II-19 RI was fired upon by other Dutch troops who had not been informed of the impending counterattack. The confusion that followed caused the attack to lose momentum before it had made contact with the enemy and by the time order had been restored, dawn had broken and the counterattack was called off. One positive side-effect of the counterattack had been that Dutch artillery support forced the Germans to abandon their own planned night attack.

=== 12 May ===
==== Capture of the Frontline ====
After the seizure of the outposts the previous day, the focus of the German force was on capturing the Frontline, which ran along the eastern slope of the Grebbeberg. Von Tiedemann decided to initiate a powerful attack on the hill. It was defended by four companies from II-8 RI and I-8 RI. They were reinforced by a machine gun company and an anti-tank unit which occupied the casemates nearby. There was a much larger number of Dutch machine guns in the frontline, so that this time there were no blind spots in which German units could hide. Von Tiedemann realised that an all-out assault like that of the day before would not work and ordered an artillery barrage which lasted for the better part of the morning. The artillery bombardment did not destroy the defensive works, but did undermine the morale of the Dutch units, which were mainly composed of conscripts.

After 12:40, the German guns ceased firing and the SS brigade attacked the Hoornwerk, an 18th-century fortification which had to be seized first. The defenders' ammunition supply was low because of skirmishes with German forces the night before and in the early afternoon the Dutch started to give way. After a short engagement, the Hoornwerk fell and the Germans stormed the hill. The Germans threatened to out-flank the Dutch casemates which could only put fire onto the area directly in front of them. A fierce battle ensued on the wooded slope, but the automatic weapons of the SS gave them an advantage. The Dutch did not have sufficient forces in reserve to initiate a counterattack.

At 16:00, the Dutch troops at the Stopline on top of the Grebbeberg encountered the first German units. A frantic attempt was made to drive the Germans back to the Frontline, but the Dutch counteroffensive was no match for German firepower. North of the Rhenen-Wageningen road, Major Johan Henri Azon Jacometti—commander of II-8 RI—personally led a counterattack, but it failed after Jacometti was killed. To stall the German advance, reinforcements were necessary, and II-19 RI—the same battalion that executed the aborted counterattack the previous night—was ordered to advance to the Frontline. The battalion, however, suffered the same fate as the night before when nervous Dutch troops once again opened fire on the battalion. The demoralised soldiers withdrew to safety and the attack petered out.

Due to its concentration, the SS brigade became vulnerable to Dutch artillery. As the German advance was largely dependent on the strength of the SS brigade, the destruction of a large part of the brigade could turn the tide of the battle. However, the Dutch artillery—to avoid hitting their own troops—executed a mainly pre-arranged fire plan aimed at the interdiction of German reinforcements. Firing on the German concentration was limited to some individual commanders using their own initiative. There was also some effective fire from mortars.

==== Infiltration of the Stopline ====
In the late afternoon and early evening, the SS brigade cleared the area between the Stopline and the Frontline of all resistance. By 20:00, the penetrated area was still quite limited with a depth of 700 m (770 yd) and a width of 1 km (0.62 mi). There was no great higher level pressure on Von Tiedemann to make haste as the main German attack was near Rotterdam. The commander of the third battalion of the SS brigade—Obersturmbannführer (Lieutenant Colonel) Hilmar Wäckerle—was not satisfied with the limited progress and considered the fact that the Grebbe Line had not yet been breached to be a stain on his personal honor. Furthermore, he noticed that the Dutch Stopline had lost most of its cohesion because of the exhausting counterattacks. Completely in line with his impetuous character and the fearsome reputation he wished to create for the Waffen-SS, Wäckerle—contrary to his orders, moved two companies of his battalion forward into the Stopline. An improvised attempt was made to penetrate the Stopline in two places: the first attempt was made by Wäckerle himself near the Rhenen-Wageningen road and the second further south near the Rhine. The first attempt succeeded and Wäckerle infiltrated the Stopline and immediately advanced unopposed for 1,500 m (1,600 yd) with a company, driving the disheartened Dutch defenders before him. He then stumbled on the final line (ruglijn), which was formed by the Rhenen-Veenendaal railway. The disadvantage of the rapid SS advance now became apparent. Because the other German units had not participated in the advance, it was not exploited and most of the Stopline held firm, leaving Wäckerle surrounded deep in enemy territory. His only hope for a further breakthrough now rested on a spontaneous collapse of the Dutch defences.

==== Dutch reserves arrive ====
At the same time, the Dutch situation seemed to improve as Dutch reinforcements arrived. II-19 RI had reassembled itself along the final line and a battalion of the 46th Infantry Regiment (I-46 RI) had been dispatched from the Betuwe to assist in the defence of the Grebbe Line. The 3rd and 4th Regiment Hussars arrived on the scene from the north. The only way into Rhenen was the viaduct underneath the railway. The viaduct was defended by units from the Royal Marechaussee led by Captain G.J.W. Gelderman. The Royal Marechaussee was tasked with preventing any units from getting past the railway, be they Germans or retreating Dutch forces. Gelderman was in the process of convincing withdrawing Dutch forces to resume fighting when Wäckerle's SS company reached his position. Gelderman gave the order to open fire and many Dutch and German soldiers were hit. The SS company was successfully contained in a factory located between the railway and the Rhine.

The reinforcements were sent in by the commander of the Field Army—Baron van Voorst tot Voorst—to stabilise the front. Van Voorst also decided to take additional measures. The number of troops at his disposal was very limited because most reserve forces were involved in repelling an airborne attack near The Hague. He could deploy seven battalions: II-11 RI, I-20 RI and five battalions of the newly arrived Brigade B. The safest option was to give up the Stopline and to regroup at a new defensive line, but the Dutch Army lacked the Engineer capacity to quickly create one and thus Van Voorst ordered the forces in the Stopline to recapture the Frontline. A captain from the General Staff sent to the 4th Division—A.H.J.L. Fiévez—drew up an attack plan on the night of 12 May.

According to the plan, three of the seven available battalions were to reinforce the troops at Grebbeberg, the Stopline and the final line, while the other four were to execute a flanking attack from the village of Achterberg, located north of the Grebbeberg. The purpose of this flanking attack was not just to drive the German forces from the hill, but also to stabilise the local situation. In the late evening, the situation north of the Grebbeberg had worsened considerably, and the counterattack also served the purpose of reversing the situation there. As night fell, a single Dutch section still occupied the Frontline; it would only surrender after the Dutch Army capitulated.

=== 13 May ===
==== The counterattack fails ====
On the morning of 13 May, Von Tiedemann had lost all contact with Wäckerle and the situation on the Grebbeberg was very confusing to him. He assumed that Dutch reinforcements were being assembled on the hill but noticed that the defences north of the Grebbeberg had deteriorated. He decided to open a second axis of attack in this sector. For the first time, the 207. ID itself was to be deployed, not against the endangered Dutch sector north of the Grebbeberg, but on the Grebbeberg itself, to pin Dutch forces there down and to purge the Stopline of defenders. The job of attacking the Dutch troops north of the hill was given to the two remaining battalions of the SS brigade, which had seen continuous action for the past two days. At the same time, the Dutch were preparing their own attack in the very same sector.

The attacks of both sides were supported by indirect fire. The Dutch requested air support from the British Royal Air Force, but they were unable to divert any planes from the ongoing battle in France. Instead, the Royal Netherlands Air Force dispatched the last aircraft it could spare: four old Fokker C.X light bombers, which were protected by the last operational fighters. Thirty bombs were dropped on the German artillery positions in front of the Grebbeberg, and the bombers—together with the fighters—continued to strafe the Germans along the Rhenen-Wageningen road until they ran out of ammunition. The Dutch used artillery too, but its effectiveness was diminished by the old fear of hitting their own forces. The Germans would use artillery too, when their attack started late in the morning.

The Dutch counterattack near Achterberg should have started at 04:30 but it was delayed until 08:00. Brigade B, which had arrived the evening before, supplied four battalions (I-29 RI, III-29 RI, II-24 RI and I-20 RI). They were ill-prepared and exhausted from having marched all day on 12 May. It was often unclear to the troops what their exact objectives were, what the terrain in front of them looked like and what resistance they could expect. The battalions were made up of middle-aged men (as the high regimental numbers show), who had not been retrained for service and had not been able to create strong bonds of comradeship. These factors contributed to less cohesion in the ranks, which would prove fatal in the battle to come.

At first, little opposition was encountered as the Dutch advanced to the Stopline and reoccupied positions which had been abandoned too hastily the evening before. But the situation deteriorated after the advance had passed the Stopline. The Dutch advance walked into a German artillery bombardment which preceded an attack by the SS. While it would have been best for the Dutch to move into defensive mode and repel the attack, the Dutch divisional command was unaware of the German intentions and it ordered the advance to continue. Many troops were killed by German artillery and by supportive fire from their own machine guns. The confused battalions—many of which had lost their NCOs—started to retreat to the Stopline at noon. A second attack wave faltered and also started to fall back and at some places the Stopline was abandoned. The retreat was exacerbated at 14:00, when 27 Junkers Ju 87 Stuka dive bombers launched an attack. Though the attack was not aimed at Brigade B, but rather at the positions on the Grebbeberg itself, it was enough to cause panic in the retreating battalions. A sauve qui peut mentality took hold of the Dutch troops and the defence mounted by the 4th Division effectively collapsed as events on the Grebbeberg itself had taken a turn for the worse.

==== The Stopline is penetrated ====
The success of a Dutch counterattack had also depended on whether the Stopline on the Grebbeberg itself would hold, for elimination of the Stopline would remove all chance of a successful defence. To make sure the line would hold, it was necessary to send in fresh troops to reinforce the line. Communication was made difficult because of the presence of Wäckerle's pocket of SS troops. The day before, many trenches south of the Rhenen-Wageningen road had been abandoned by Dutch forces. Fièvez—who did not have a clear picture of the situation near the Stopline—had designated the final line (ruglijn) near the railway in Rhenen as the main line of defence. This caused the Stopline to be undermanned. Furthermore, as the final line served only as an assembly area for incoming reinforcements rather than as a true defensive perimeter, the final line could not be developed into a fully fledged defensive position. By the time these mistakes became apparent, it was too late to reinforce the endangered Stopline.

The fatal decision not to cut down wooded areas near the Stopline now became detrimental to the defenders, who were unable to keep German forces at bay due to the cover the trees provided. The Stopline was intended as the last real line of defence to serve as a point from which an enemy breakthrough could be countered; it thus had no deeper positions. Once the stopline was breached, the Grebbe Line would be jeopardised. After a brief artillery barrage the Germans launched their first attack. Although it was generally unsuccessful, some German units managed to break through the line. Most of the German troops in this attack were older and less experienced and they panicked. But the German commanders were aware of this possibility and after a second artillery bombardment another attempt was made by the second echelon. This attempt proved to be successful shortly after noon, and—using the earlier penetration—the Stopline was largely put out of action. A fierce struggle ensued in the woods as the German forces started their descent into Rhenen. Most Dutch command posts were located behind the stopline and they now came under attack. One command post was valiantly defended by the commander of I-8 RI—Major Willem Pieter Landzaat — who gave his men the order to "stand firm behind the rubble" and to "resist until the last bullet". Once the defenders had run out of ammunition, Landzaat thanked and dismissed his men and continued to defend the command post. His body was found after the battle by his wife. After the war, Landzaat would be posthumously awarded the Order of William, the highest Dutch military honor. The attacking Germans had become nervous, and it took quite a few hours before the area between the Stopline and the railway was cleared of Dutch soldiers. At 17:00, the German forces started to reform for an attack on the final line. But Dutch morale had broken to such an extent that such an assault was no longer necessary.

==== Rout at the final line ====
There were a lot of Dutch soldiers in and around Rhenen, but most were in scattered groups guarding the railway. There was little co-ordination and the different commands in the area overlapped so that all oversight was lost. Most troops were exhausted and nervous because of the continuous artillery bombardment. Overall command in the sector had devolved to jonkheer De Marees van Swinderen, the commander of the 4th Hussar Regiment. He had not been informed of the situation in the Grebbeberg and did not send any reinforcements to the Stopline. Instead, he sent some troops back to Elst—some 6 km (3.7 mi) west of Rhenen—to form a mobile reserve. This caused the cohesion of the Dutch forces in Rhenen to further decrease. As the day progressed, more troops would leave the battlefield to retreat westward.

German dead.

In the meantime, Wäckerle's stranded SS company had spent an uncomfortable night in the factory. They made two attempts to break through the final line, during which Wäckerle violated the laws of war. The first attempt involved the use of Dutch prisoners of war as a human shield and subsequently he ordered his men to advance in Dutch uniforms. The Royal Marechausse unit under Captain Gelderman—with orders to shoot all men moving in the wrong (westward) direction—repelled both attempts. During the second effort, the masquerading SS troops were given away by their distinctive boots. Wäckerle's manoeuvering had failed, the Dutch forces destroyed the viaduct. Wäckerle himself was badly wounded, he was relieved by German forces in the afternoon and went to Wageningen for treatment.

The same air attack that had caused Brigade B north of the Grebbeberg to turn tail and run, also hit parts of the final line. It had the same effect — little physical damage but a complete breakdown of morale. Most Dutch troops started to leave the battlefield at this point. At 16:00, Captain Gelderman noticed to his amazement that only 15 men remained in his vicinity while he had ordered food for 600 earlier that morning. By this time, the entire Dutch 4th Division had come to the conclusion that it had suffered a defeat and that only a retreat could save their formation. The reserves behind the line were caught in the withdrawal after rumors spread that an official retreat had been ordered. One exception to this massive rout was a company of the 11th Border Battalion, the last Dutch reinforcements sent to the Grebbeberg. In the evening, it crossed the final line and evicted German forces from the railway station. In the end, their deployment did not make any difference and the battalion withdrew as Rhenen was being destroyed by fire.

== Aftermath ==
The fall of the Grebbeberg was a huge blow to the Dutch. Defeat at this location meant the collapse of the entire Grebbe line and forced the Dutch to a full retreat of six divisions to the East Front of the Waterline. This was quickly and successfully executed during the afternoon and late evening of 13 May and finalized in the morning of 14 May, the German forces being unaware the Dutch lines had been abandoned until that morning.

== Casualties ==
Dutch casualties were heavy. In total, 18 officers and 399 NCOs and men had lost their lives during the three days of battle. German casualties were lower, but this has led to some contention since many eye-witness reports do not match those figures that the Germans released. The official number is 238 KIA, but estimates move between 250 and 300 killed.

== Fall of the Netherlands ==
The East Front of Fortress Holland would never be attacked, as in the evening of 14 May 1940, the Dutch, after the Bombardment of Rotterdam surrendered in all provinces except Zeeland, where they continued to resist.

== See also ==
- List of Dutch military equipment of World War II
- List of German military equipment of World War II
