= Grebbeberg =

Hill in Rhenen in the Netherlands

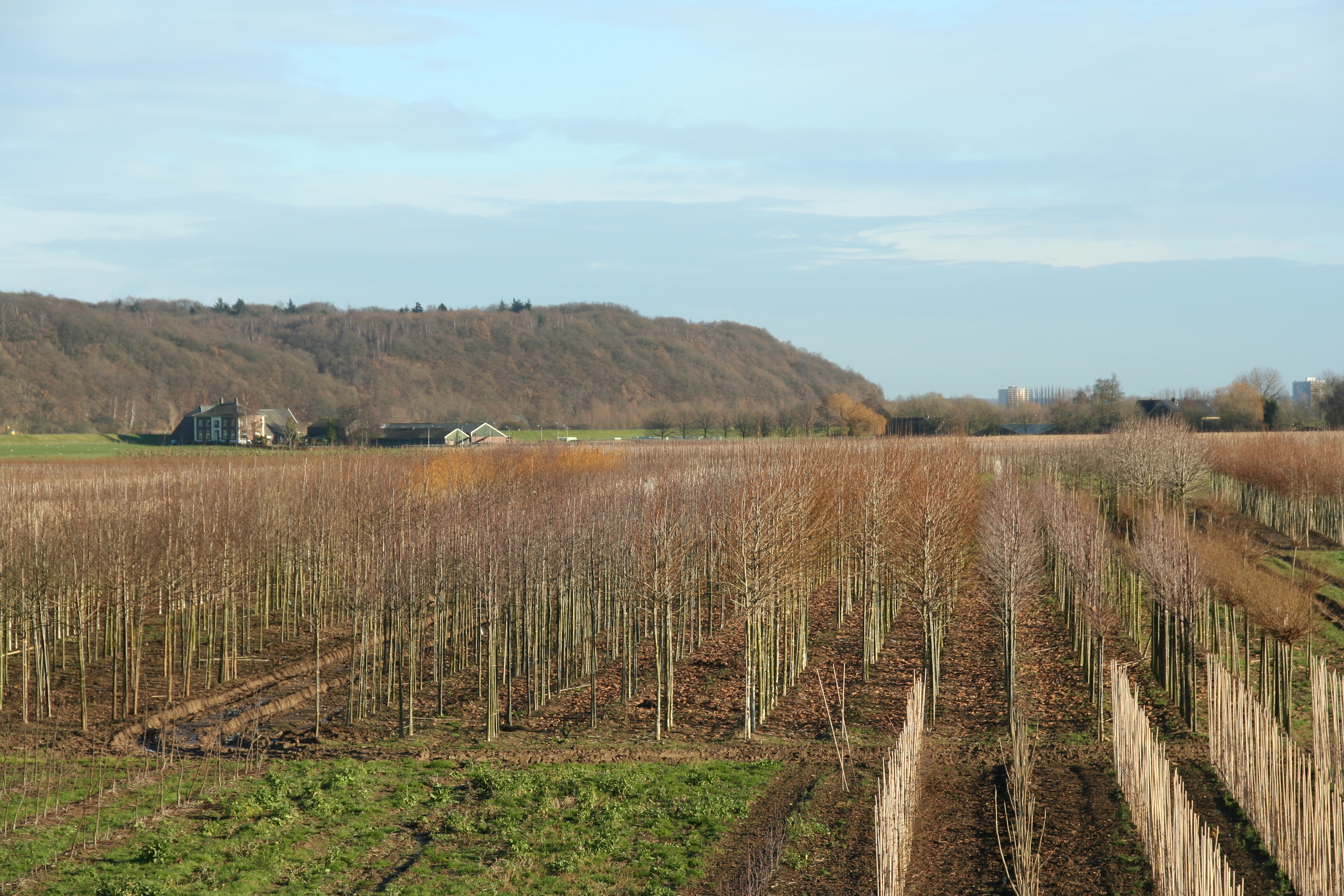
- The Grebbeberg, as seen from the south

Highest point
- Elevation: 170 ft (52 m)
- Coordinates: 51.954°N 5.600°E

Geography
- Location: Rhenen, Utrecht Province, Netherlands

The Grebbeberg is a 52-meter high hill located east of Rhenen, Netherlands in the province of Utrecht. It forms the southeastern tip of the Utrecht Hill Ridge, a moraine. Due to its strategic location with a view of the Lower Rhine and the Betuwe, this hill was historically of great importance. The Grebbe Line was constructed from here in the 18th century. The hill is best known for the Battle of the Grebbeberg in May 1940. On the Grebbeberg is the Grebbeberg War Cemetery where Dutch soldiers are buried.

== History ==
Fortifications were located on the Grebbeberg early on. The ring wall with dry moat, the so-called Heimenberg, probably dates from the seventh century and has been restored several times. The original function is not clear; it may be a defense work of the Frisians against the Franks, but also the other way around. After 1620, the exiled Winter King, Frederick V of the Palatinate, had his hunting ground here, where he held hunting feasts on a plateau above the Rhine, the so-called King's Table.

=== World War II ===
In May 1940, Dutch soldiers fought a German assault army on the Grebbeberg, including Waffen-SS units. Remnants of fortifications still stand as a symbol of the battle. The Grebbeberg War Cemetery is the first official one in the Netherlands. Since 1946, Dutch soldiers who fell elsewhere have also been buried here. The plot has almost 850 graves. A monument has been placed at the honorary cemetery where the dead from the Second World War are commemorated every year on May 4.

== Nature ==
The Grebbeberg was originally covered with plantations of coppice oak. Since the plantations have lost their purpose, an upright oak forest has been able to develop. In 2002 the Grebbeberg was connected to the Blauwe Kamer nature reserve in the floodplains. This allows the free-living herds of Konik horses and Galloway cattle to seek the safety of the mountain at high tide. On the Grebbeberg itself, Het Utrechts Landschap owns 66 hectares, mainly forest.

The Grebbeberg has steep to very steep slopes, especially on the river side, locally almost like a cliff, which entails special environmental conditions for the Netherlands. This includes erosion and also, partly because of its location on the south, an extra warm microclimate. As a result, a special flora occurs locally, as is the case on the Wageningse Berg. The rare pipe flower can be found in a few places on the path under the Grebbeberg.

As a result of the erosive effect of the river system of the Rhine, the originally existing connection between the Utrechtse Heuvelrug and the moraine of Ede - Wageningen has been broken. The very steep slopes of the Grebbeberg are the visible result of this process. The Grebbeberg is a geologically valuable area. The southern flank of the Grebbeberg was the first geological monument designated by the province of Utrecht.

== Topography ==
The name Grebbeberg is derived from the Bisschop Davidsgrift or Grebbe, a historic canal and predecessor of the Valleikanaal that opened into the Lower Rhine at the foot of the Grebbeberg. The northern part of the Grebbeberg is called Laarsenberg and is often seen as a separate hill. Here is an area of 80 ha. owned by Het Utrechts Landschap. The Ouwehands Zoo is also located on this part of the Grebbeberg.

== Cycling ==
The eastern slope of the Grebbeberg is popular with sports cyclists because of its gradient. With a maximum gradient of 7% and a gradient of more than 5% for half a kilometer, it is one of the steeper slopes of the Heuvelrug. The west side (over a hundred meters) does not exceed 3% and is much shallower.

== See also ==
- Utrecht (province)
