= Willem Pieter Landzaat =

Royal Netherlands Army officer

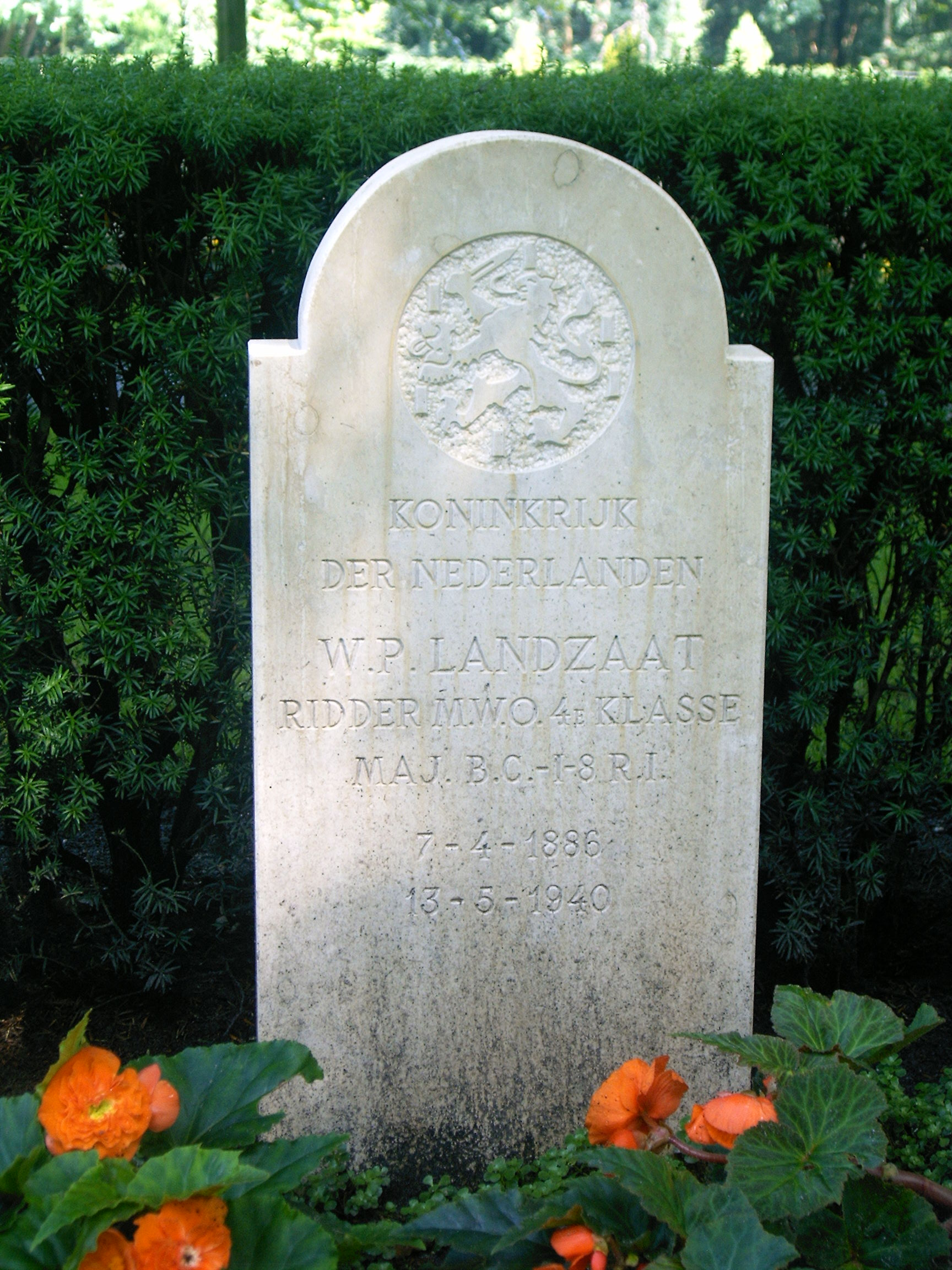
Gravestone of Major Landzaat at the Military War Cemetery Grebbeberg

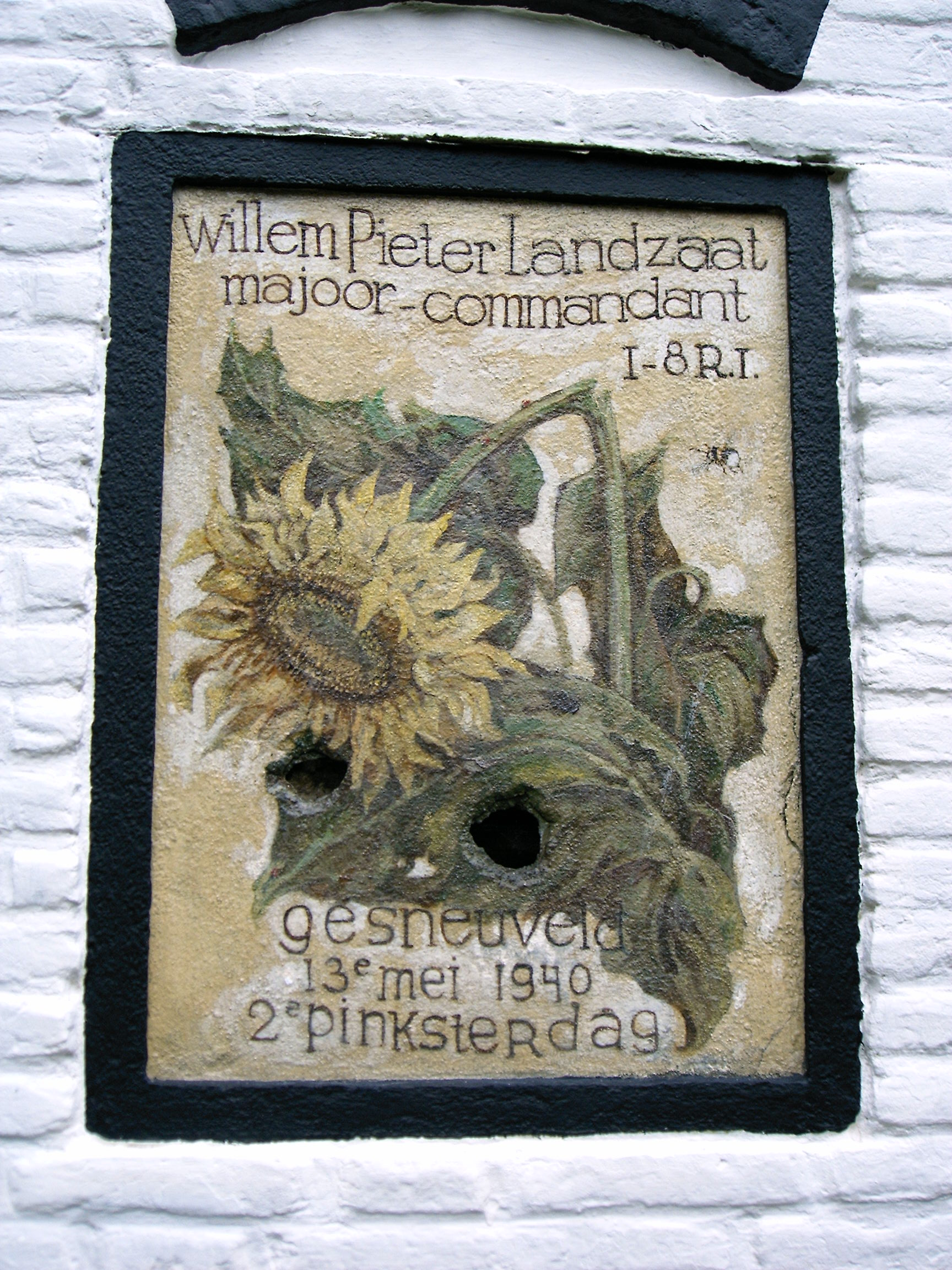
Memorial at the former commandpost in Rhenen

Willem Pieter Landzaat (Leiden, 7 April 1886 – Rhenen, 13 May 1940) was a Dutch military officer who died during the Battle of the Grebbeberg.

In May 1940 Major Landzaat was commander of the 1st Battalion, 8th Regiment Infantry (I-8 R.I.). On 13 May, his command post, located in a pavilion where a restaurant was located, south of "Ouwehands Dierenpark", was surrounded and attacked. Landzaat said he would defend the Grebbeberg to the last man and last bullet. Earlier, on May 12, he had given the command "stand firm behind the rubble" to his troops.

He organized the defense of his own command post and operated the machine gun. When the last ammunition was gone, he thanked his troops for their commitment with the words "you have fought like heroes, thank you" and gave them permission to leave the post. He himself stayed behind until the last moment to preserve. After the battle, his remains were recovered from the ruined and burnt pavilion and buried in the Military War Cemetery Grebbeberg.

On 9 May 1946, Landzaat was posthumously awarded the Militaire Willems Orde (Military William Order), the highest Dutch military honor.

== Sources ==
- War over Holland: Part II: The Grebbeline
- Dutch War Grave Commission
- (in Dutch) Het epos van het paviljoentje
- (in Dutch) E.H. Brongers: Grebbelinie 1940, 11th edition, Uitgeverij Aspekt, 2004. ISBN 90-5911-083-8. p. 203–207.
- (in Dutch) Herman Amersfoort & Piet Kamphuis: Mei 1940, De strijd op Nederlands grondgebied, 2d edition, Sdu, 2005. ISBN 90-12-08959-X. p. 296.

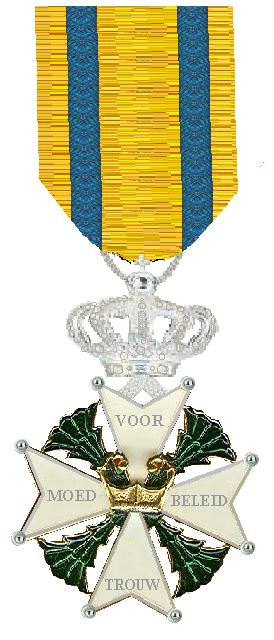
Order of William
