= Godfried van Voorst tot Voorst =

Dutch general

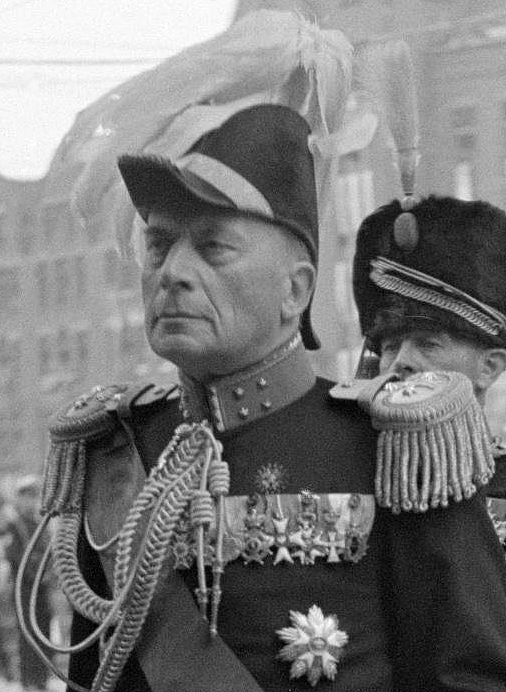
- Born: Jan Joseph Godfried van Voorst tot Voorst; 29 December 1880; Kampen, Netherlands
- Died: 11 November 1963 (aged 82); Vierakker, Netherlands
- Military career
- Allegiance: Netherlands
- Branch: Royal Netherlands Army
- Service years: 1901–1963
- Rank: General
- Wars: World War II; Battle of the Netherlands; Battle of the Grebbeberg

Jan Joseph Godfried, Baron van Voorst tot Voorst Jr. (Note: 'van' and 'tot' are tussenvoegsels.) (29 December 1880 – 11 November 1963) was the second highest officer in command of the Dutch armed forces during World War II and a renowned strategist, who wrote numerous articles and books on modern warfare.

== Personal life ==
He was the fifth child of Jan Joseph Godfried van Voorst tot Voorst sr.—lieutenant general and president of the Senate of the Netherlands—and Anna Cremers. With his first wife, Jkvr. Octavia Ottine van Nispen tot Pannerden (1885–1947), he had six children. His second wife, Jkvr. Joanna Maria Alfrida Louisa (1910–1992), was a daughter of the Dutch Prime Minister Charles Ruijs de Beerenbrouck.

== Military career ==
After he completed his secondary education, he was admitted to the Royal Military Academy (KMA) in Breda in 1898. In 1901, he graduated first in his class, and enlisted in an infantry regiment in Haarlem. During the general railway strikes in 1903, he was the only lieutenant in charge of a unit protecting the train station of Haarlem. In 1907, he became a personal adjutant of Queen Wilhelmina, and in this function accompanied her on various state visits. During the First World War and the mobilization of the Dutch Army, he served in various ranks. These experiences and his concerns regarding the Schlieffen Plan led him to write a study highlighting the critical importance of the province of Limburg in German strategic planning. The publication was translated into Spanish, English, French and Norwegian. In 1920, Godfried became a member of the general staff and represented the Netherlands in the disarmament conference in Geneva.

In the wake of the Great Depression, he managed to restore order after the 1934 riots in Amsterdam. This was the first time that armored vehicles were deployed by the Dutch army. In 1935, he supervised the Dutch troops monitoring the 1935 plebiscite in the Saar.

Throughout the 1920s and 1930s, he was highly critical of the "broken rifle" movement and the prevailing pacifist mentality of Dutch society and politics, which he deemed naïve. In later life, he would comment that this era was the low point in the history of Dutch defense. In 1936, he published a widely read book on the German rearmament —an early warning against Nazi militarism.

By the late 1930s, Dutch politicians finally realized that their country would not be able to remain neutral in the looming conflict with Nazi Germany. During the hasty and belated military preparations, Godfried firmly rejected the ideas of general Izaak Reijnders. Godfried warned against Blitzkrieg tactics and mechanized warfare, whereas Reijnders believed that a possible German invasion would be preceded by long political and diplomatic tensions. Although, Reinders's plans were initially adopted, his conflict with the secretary of defense Adriaan Dijxhoorn led to the resignation of the former. Since two brothers of the van Voorst tot Voorst family served in the general staff and because their Roman Catholic background was controversial among Protestants, Dijxhoorn appointed the retired general Henri Winkelman, who supported the strategic plans of Godfried.

Much time was lost due to these internal arguments, and when Nazi Germany invaded the Netherlands on May 10, 1940, the Dutch armed forces were insufficiently prepared. Godfried attempted to defend the Grebbeberg, but was ultimately forced to withdraw to the West of the Netherlands. After the Rotterdam Blitz and the German threat to annihilate other Dutch cities, he advised Winkelman to surrender.

After the Battle of the Netherlands, he refused to pledge an oath of loyalty to the Nazis, and as a consequence, he was sent (together with his brother, H.F.M. Baron van Voorst tot Voorst) to a prisoner-of-war camp in Germany for the five remaining years of the war. Following the end of Nazi Germany, he returned to the Netherlands, where he assumed various military and civil positions. In 1960, on his 80th birthday, he was awarded the titular rank of general.

== Selected publications ==
- Over Roermond! Een strategische studie (in Dutch). The Hague: De Swart. 1923. OCLC 64804396.
- Het ontwapenings-vraagstuk (in Dutch). The Hague: Leopold. 1927. OCLC 63509732.
- Studiën over ontwapening (in Dutch). The Hague: De Swart. 1927. OCLC 68051875.
- De Duitsche herbewapening (in Dutch). The Hague: Moorman. 1936. OCLC 781558091.

== Honors and decorations ==
- Commander of the Order of the Netherlands Lion
- Knight of the Order of Orange-Nassau
- (Belgium) Grand Cross of the Order of the Crown
- (France) Knight of the Legion of Honor
- (Denmark) Knight of the Order of the Dannebrog
- (Kingdom of Prussia) Knight of the Order of the Red Eagle
