= Detention basin =

Flood control measure

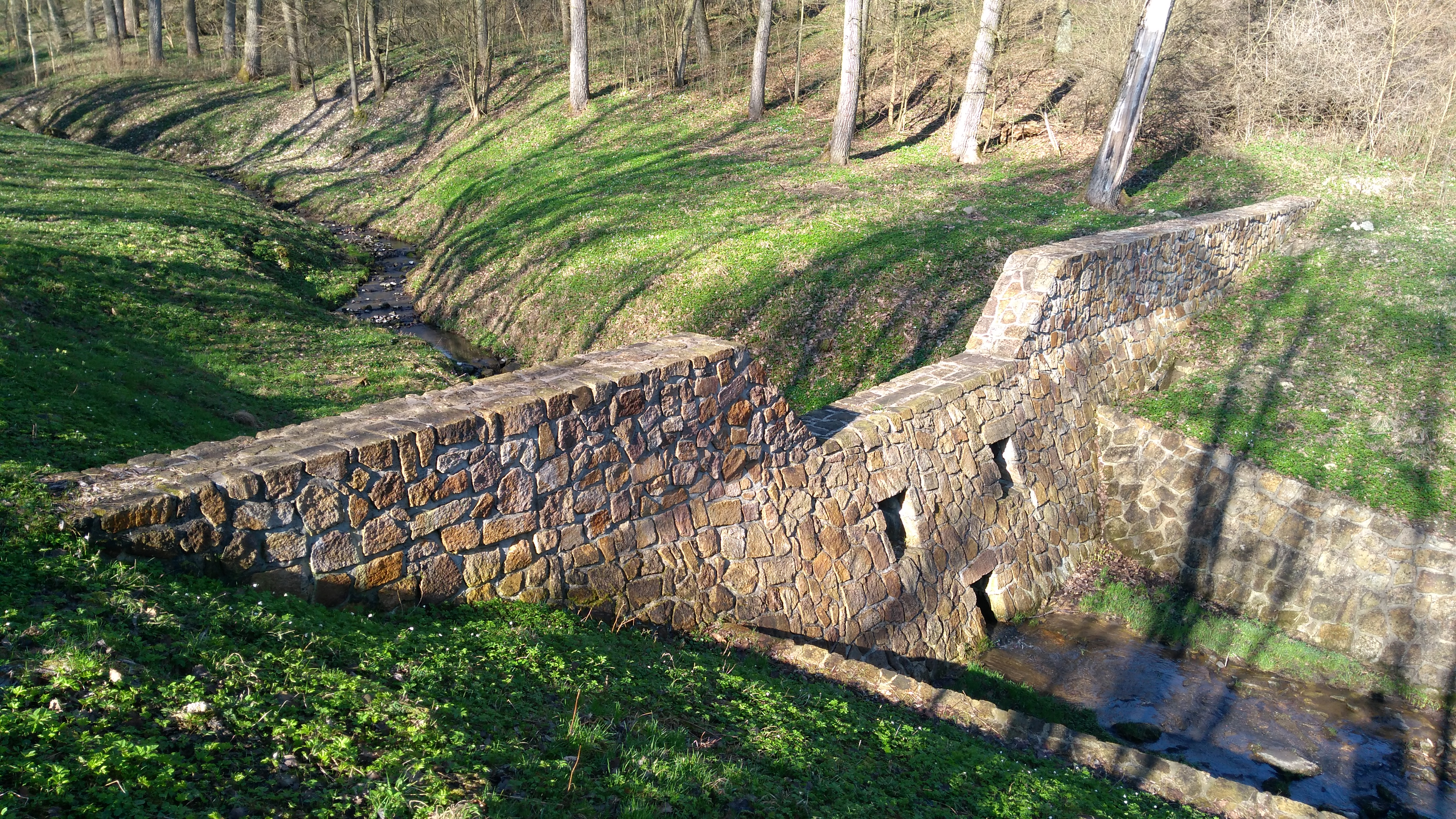
Dry pond on brook to reduce floods, near Děčín, Czech Republic

A detention basin or retarding basin is an excavated area installed on, or adjacent to, tributaries of rivers, streams, lakes or bays to protect against flooding and, in some cases, downstream erosion by storing water for a limited period of time. These basins are also called dry ponds, holding ponds or dry detention basins if no permanent pool of water exists.

Detention ponds that are designed to permanently retain some volume of water at all times are called retention basins. In its basic form, a detention basin is used to manage water quantity while having a limited effectiveness in protecting water quality, unless it includes a permanent pool feature.

== Functions and design ==
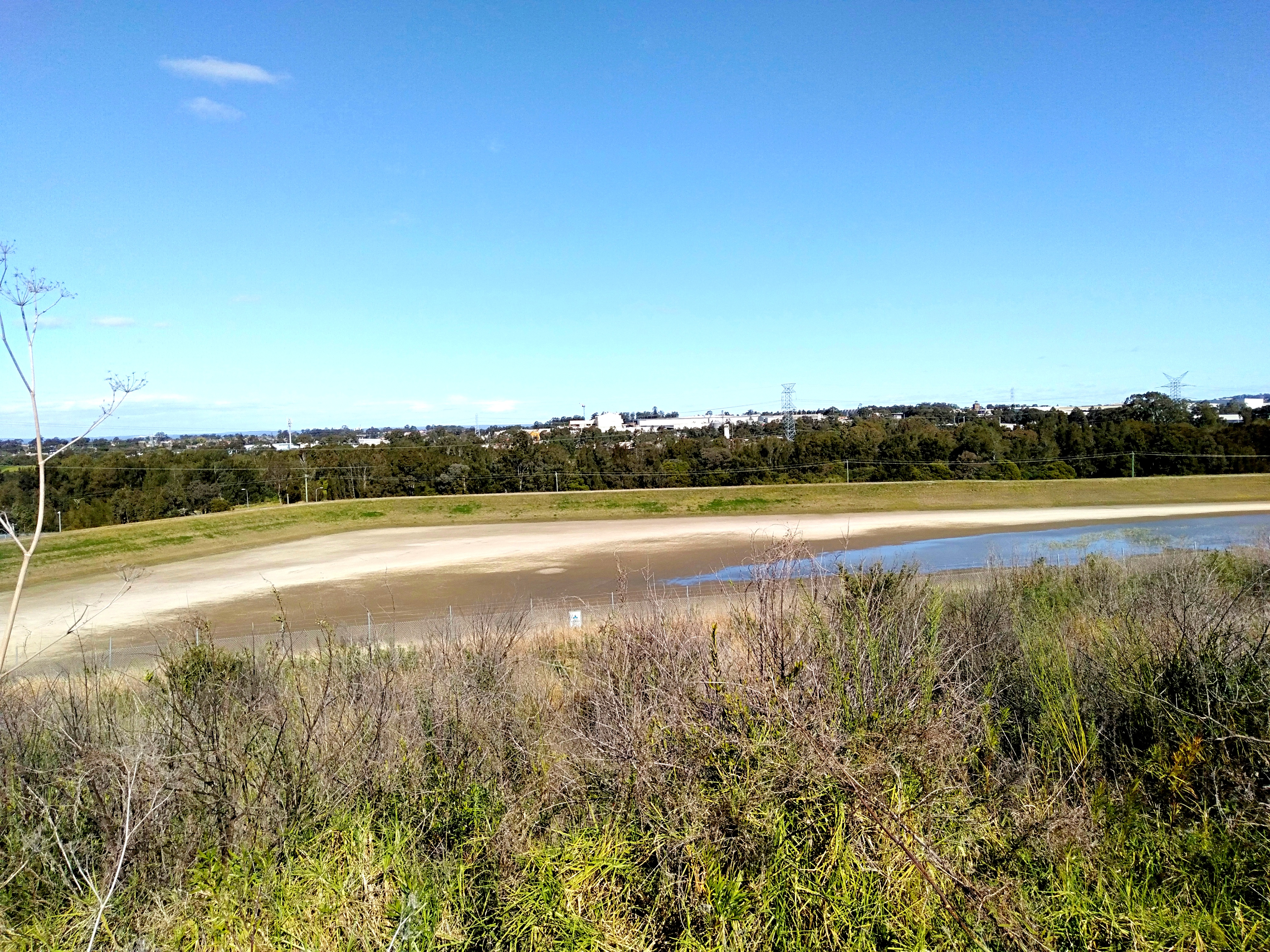
A detention basin in Western Sydney, Australia

Detention basins are storm water best management practices that provide general flood protection and can also control extreme floods such as a 1 in 100-year storm event. The basins are typically built during the construction of new land development projects including residential subdivisions or shopping centers. The ponds help manage the excess urban runoff generated by newly constructed impervious surfaces such as roads, parking lots and rooftops. A basin functions by allowing large flows of water to enter but limits the outflow by having a small opening at the lowest point of the structure. The size of this opening is determined by the capacity of underground and downstream culverts and washes to handle the release of the contained water.

Frequently the inflow area is constructed to protect the structure from some types of damage. Offset concrete blocks in the entrance spillways are used to reduce the speed of entering flood water. These structures may also have debris drop vaults to collect large rocks. These vaults are deep holes under the entrance to the structure. The holes are wide enough to allow large rocks and other debris to fall into the holes before they can damage the rest of the structure. These vaults must be emptied after each storm event. Research has shown that detention basins built with real-time control of the outflow from the basin are significantly more effective at retaining total suspended solids and associated contaminants, such as heavy metals, when compared to basins without control.

== Use in urban parks ==
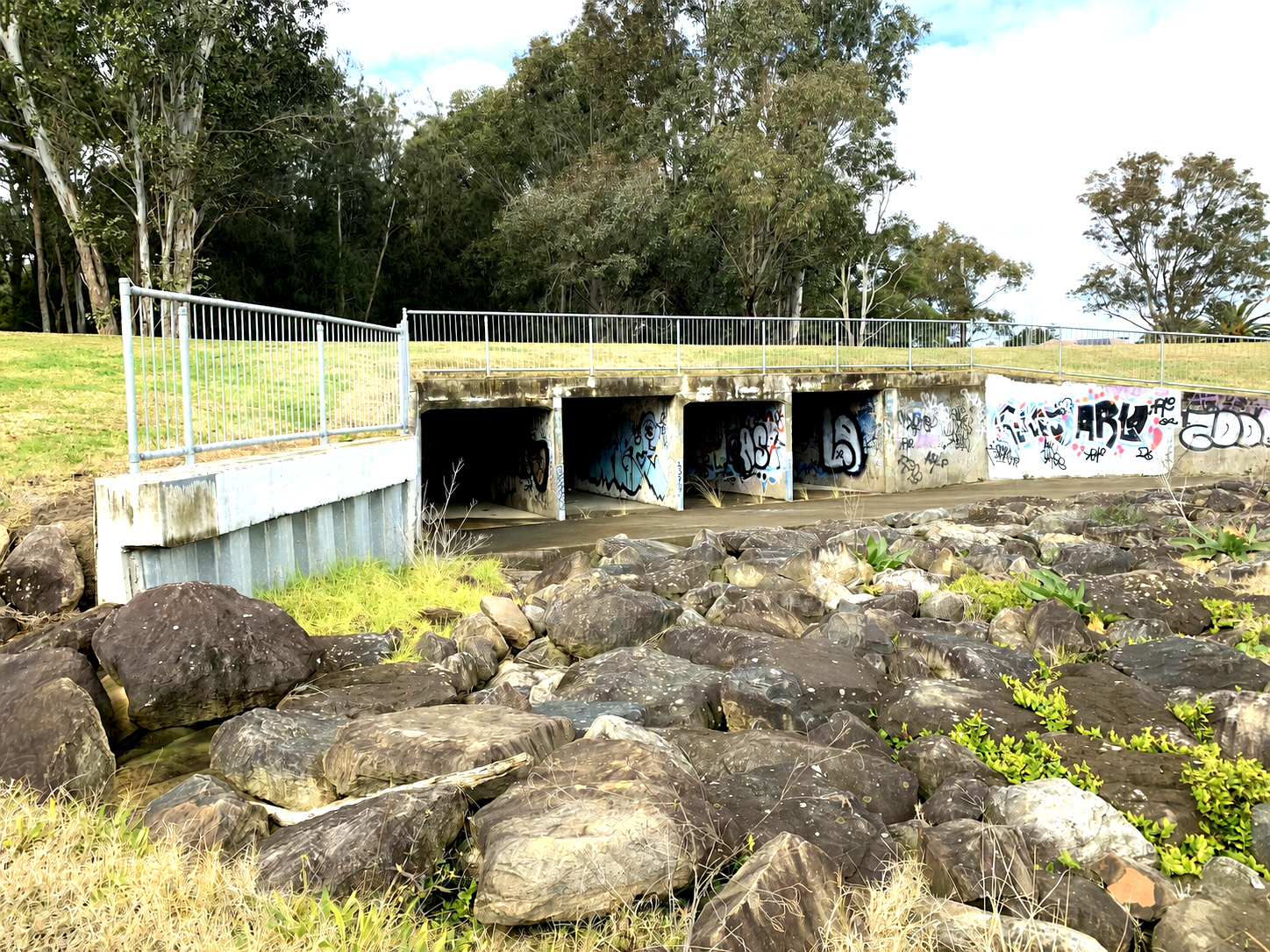
A detention basin at Rosford Park, Smithfield, New South Wales

Urban parks can also be designed to function as dual-purpose detention basins, combining flood control with recreational and open space uses. During normal conditions, the area can function as a sports field, parkland or other public recreational space, while during major rainfall events its lower-lying areas temporarily store stormwater. Once the rainfall event has passed, the stored water is gradually released through a controlled outlet and the area can return to its normal use. NSW Government guidance specifically identifies detention basins that drain between storm events as having potential for multiple uses, including sports fields and parks. A dual-purpose basin can be incorporated into a park through features such as a shallow depression, embankments, inlet structures and a restricted outlet. The outlet controls the rate at which water leaves the basin, temporarily reducing peak flows and the potential for flooding downstream. Extended detention basins can remain essentially dry between storm events, allowing the land to retain its recreational function for much of the time.

This approach allows a single area of land to provide both flood mitigation and public open space, which can be particularly useful in densely developed urban areas where land is limited. For example, Joynton Park in Zetland, Sydney, was designed to function as a detention basin during major storm events while serving as a public park during dry weather. Similar arrangements can incorporate sports fields, walking paths, landscaping and other recreational facilities alongside stormwater infrastructure. A stormwater management project at Sydney Park also demonstrates how water infrastructure can be integrated into a public park while providing recreational and environmental benefits. The recreational use of detention basins requires careful design because the area can become temporarily inundated during storms. Thus, a park that appears to be an ordinary grassed recreation area can also form part of an urban stormwater management system. Under normal conditions it functions as public open space; during a sufficiently large storm, designated areas can temporarily fill with water, slowing and storing runoff before it is released downstream.

== Extended detention basin ==
A variant basin design called an extended detention dry basin can limit downstream erosion and control some pollutants such as suspended solids. This basin type differs from a retention basin, also known as a "wet pond," which includes a permanent pool of water. While basic detention ponds are typically designed to empty within 6 to 12 hours after a storm, extended detention (ED) dry basins improve the basic detention design by lengthening the storage time, for example, to 24 or 48 hours. Longer detention allows for more settling of suspended solids, resulting in higher-quality water.

== See also ==
- Dry dam
- Groundwater banking
- Stream restoration
- Sustainable urban drainage systems
- Balancing lake
