= Flood =

Water overflow submerging usually-dry land

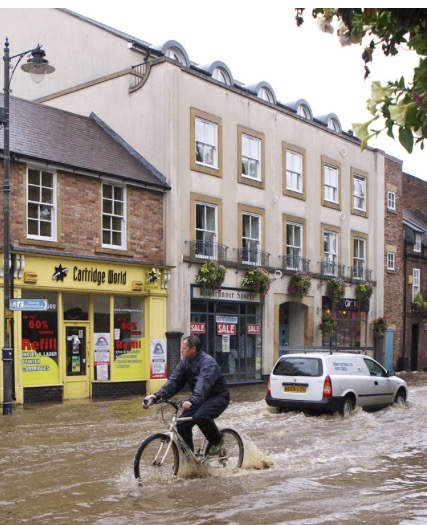
Urban flooding in a street in Morpeth, England, 2008

A flood is an overflow of water (or rarely other fluids) that submerges land that is usually dry. In the sense of "flowing water", the word may also be applied to the inflow of the tide. Floods are of significant concern in agriculture, civil engineering and public health. Human changes to the environment often increase the intensity and frequency of flooding. Examples for human changes are land use changes such as deforestation and removal of wetlands, changes in waterway course or flood controls such as with levees. Global environmental issues also influence causes of floods, namely climate change which causes an intensification of the water cycle and sea level rise. For example, climate change makes extreme weather events more frequent and stronger. This leads to more intense floods and increased flood risk.

Natural types of floods include river flooding, groundwater flooding, coastal flooding, and urban flooding, sometimes known as flash flooding. Tidal flooding may include elements of both river and coastal flooding processes in estuary areas. There is also the intentional flooding of land that would otherwise remain dry. This may take place for agricultural, military, or river-management purposes. For example, agricultural flooding may occur in preparing paddy fields for the growing of semi-aquatic rice in many countries.

Flooding may occur as an overflow of water from water bodies, such as a river, lake, sea or ocean. In these cases, the water overtops or breaks levees, resulting in some of that water escaping its usual boundaries. Flooding may also occur due to an accumulation of rainwater on saturated ground. This is called an areal flood. The size of a lake or other body of water naturally varies with seasonal changes in precipitation and snow melt. Those changes in size are however not considered a flood unless they flood property or drown domestic animals.

Floods can also occur in rivers when the flow rate exceeds the capacity of the river channel, particularly at bends or meanders in the waterway. Floods often cause damage to homes and businesses if these buildings are in the natural flood plains of rivers. People could avoid riverine flood damage by moving away from rivers. However, people in many countries have traditionally lived and worked by rivers because the land is usually flat and fertile. Also, the rivers provide easy travel and access to commerce and industry.

Flooding can damage property and also lead to secondary impacts. These include in the short term an increased spread of waterborne diseases and vector-bourne diseases, for example those diseases transmitted by mosquitos. Flooding can also lead to long-term displacement of residents. Floods are an area of study of hydrology and hydraulic engineering.

A large amount of the world's population lives in close proximity to major coastlines, while many major cities and agricultural areas are located near floodplains. There is significant risk for increased coastal and fluvial flooding due to changing climatic conditions.

== Etymology ==
The word "flood" comes from the Old English flōd, a word common to Germanic languages (compare German Flut, Dutch vloed from the same root as is seen in flow, float; also compare with Latin fluctus, flumen), meaning "a flowing of water, tide, an overflowing of land by water, a deluge, Noah's Flood; mass of water, river, sea, wave". The Old English word flōd comes from the Proto-Germanic floduz (Old Frisian flod, Old Norse floð, Middle Dutch vloet, Dutch vloed, German Flut, and Gothic flodus derives from floduz).

== Types ==
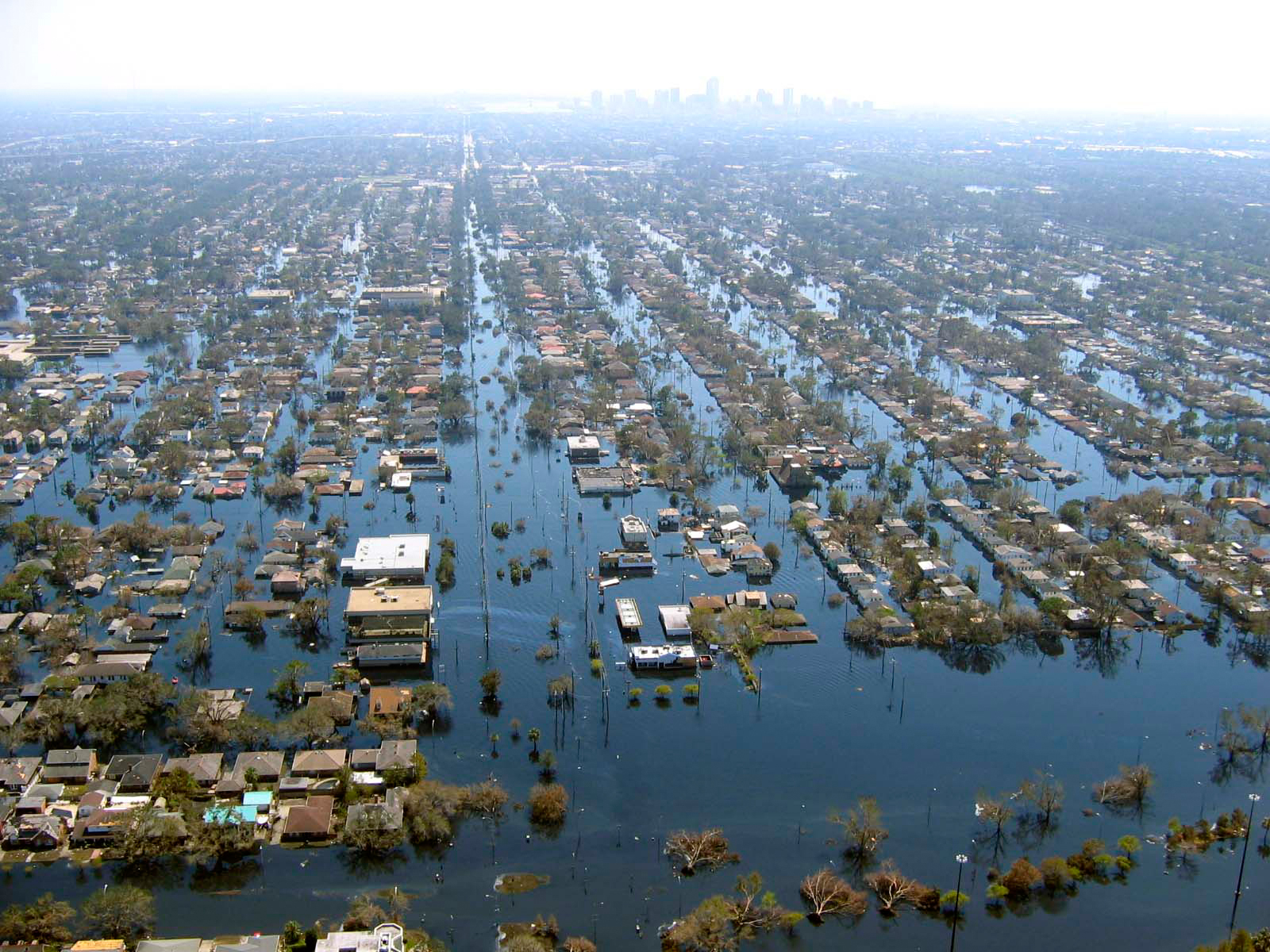
View of flooded New Orleans in the aftermath of Hurricane Katrina

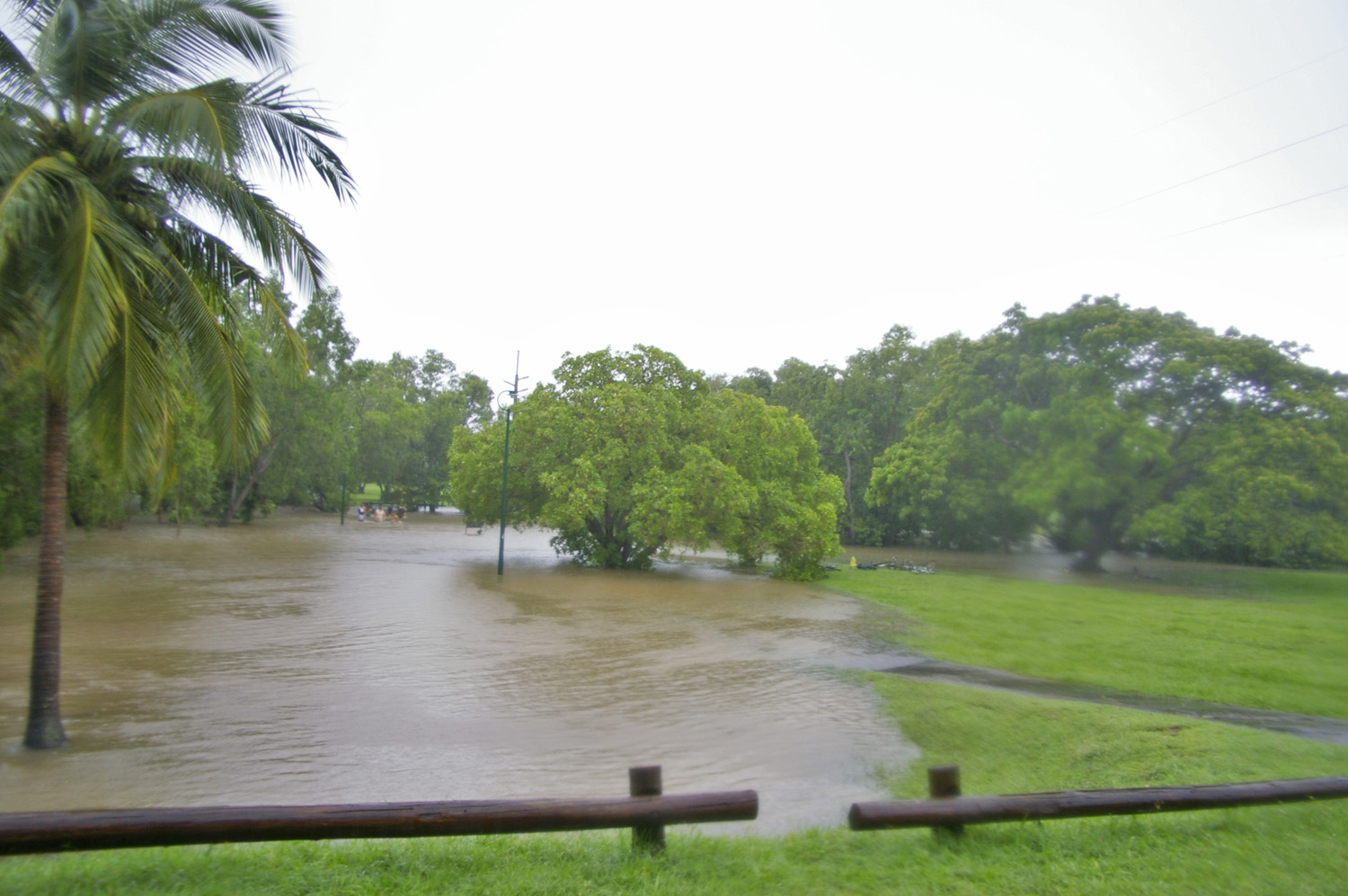
Flooding of a creek due to heavy monsoonal rain and high tide in Darwin, Northern Territory, Australia

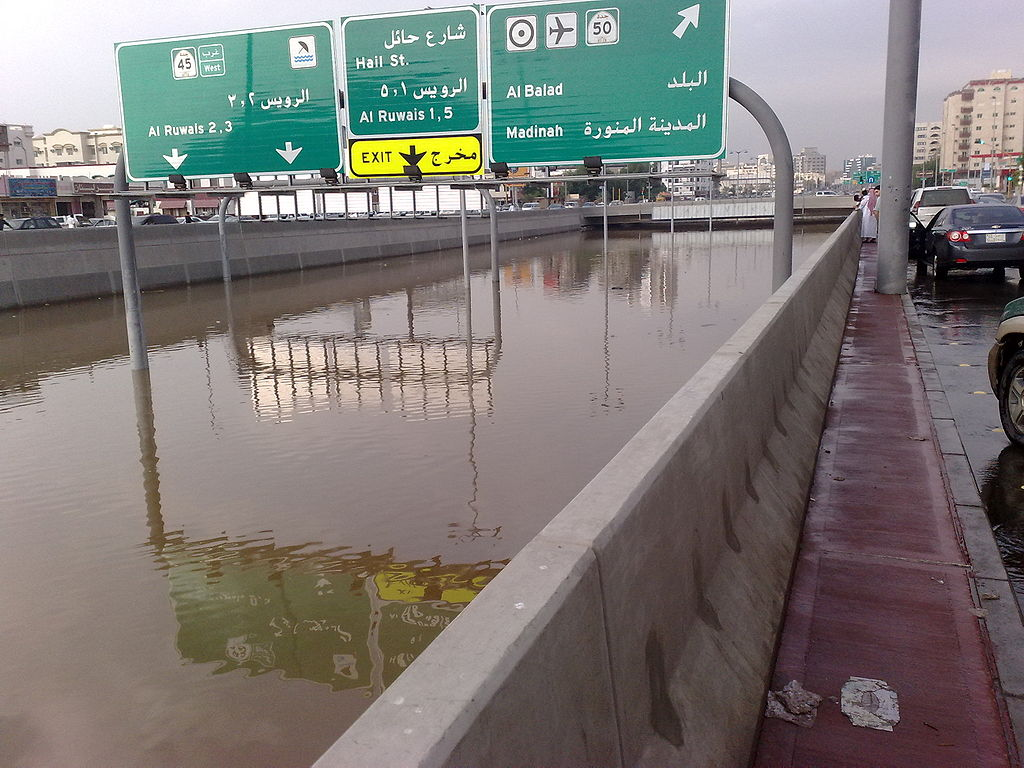
Flood in Jeddah, covering the King Abdullah Street in Saudi Arabia

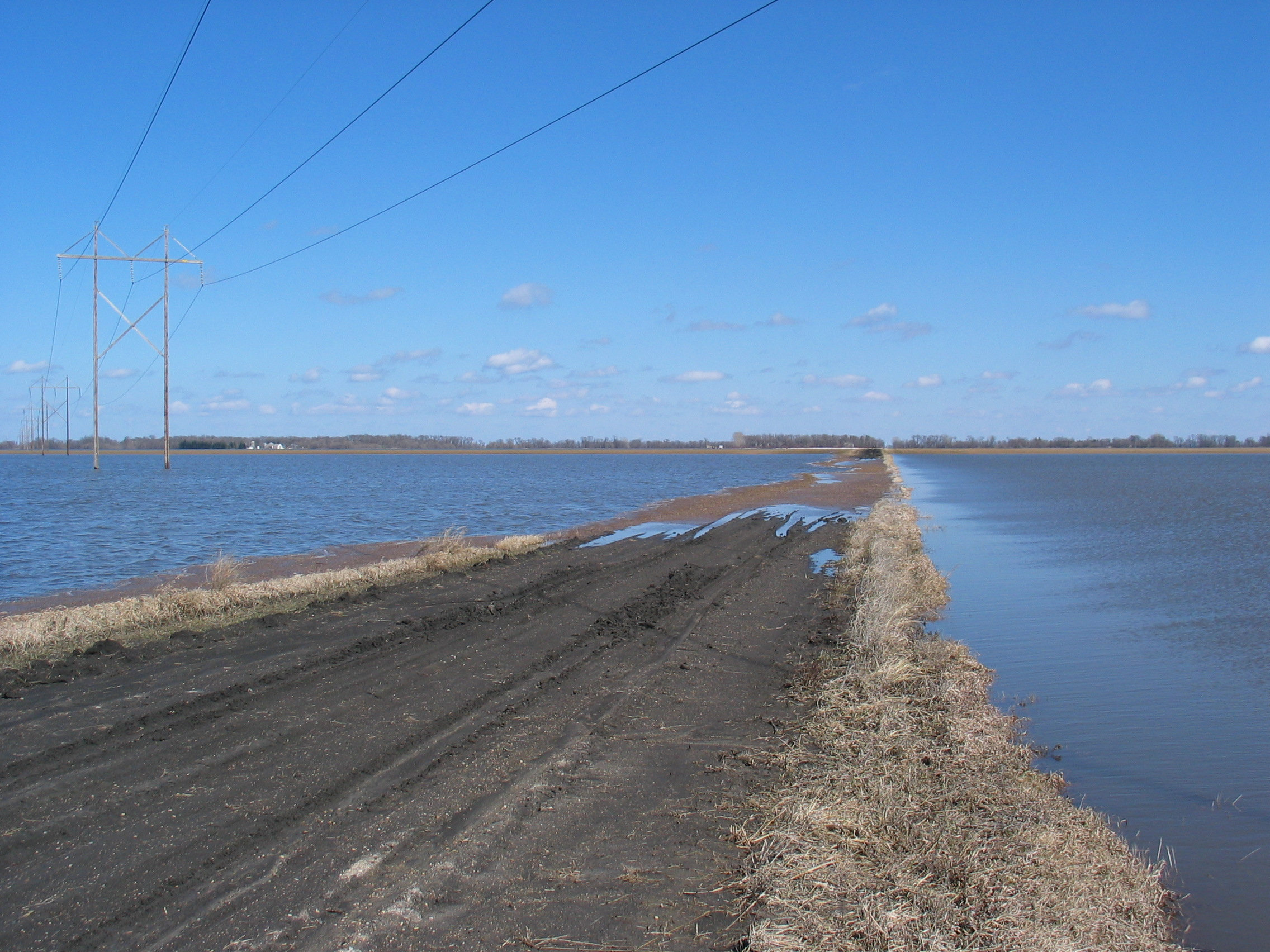
Overland flooding near Georgetown, Minnesota, in the Red River Valley of the North

=== Areal flooding ===
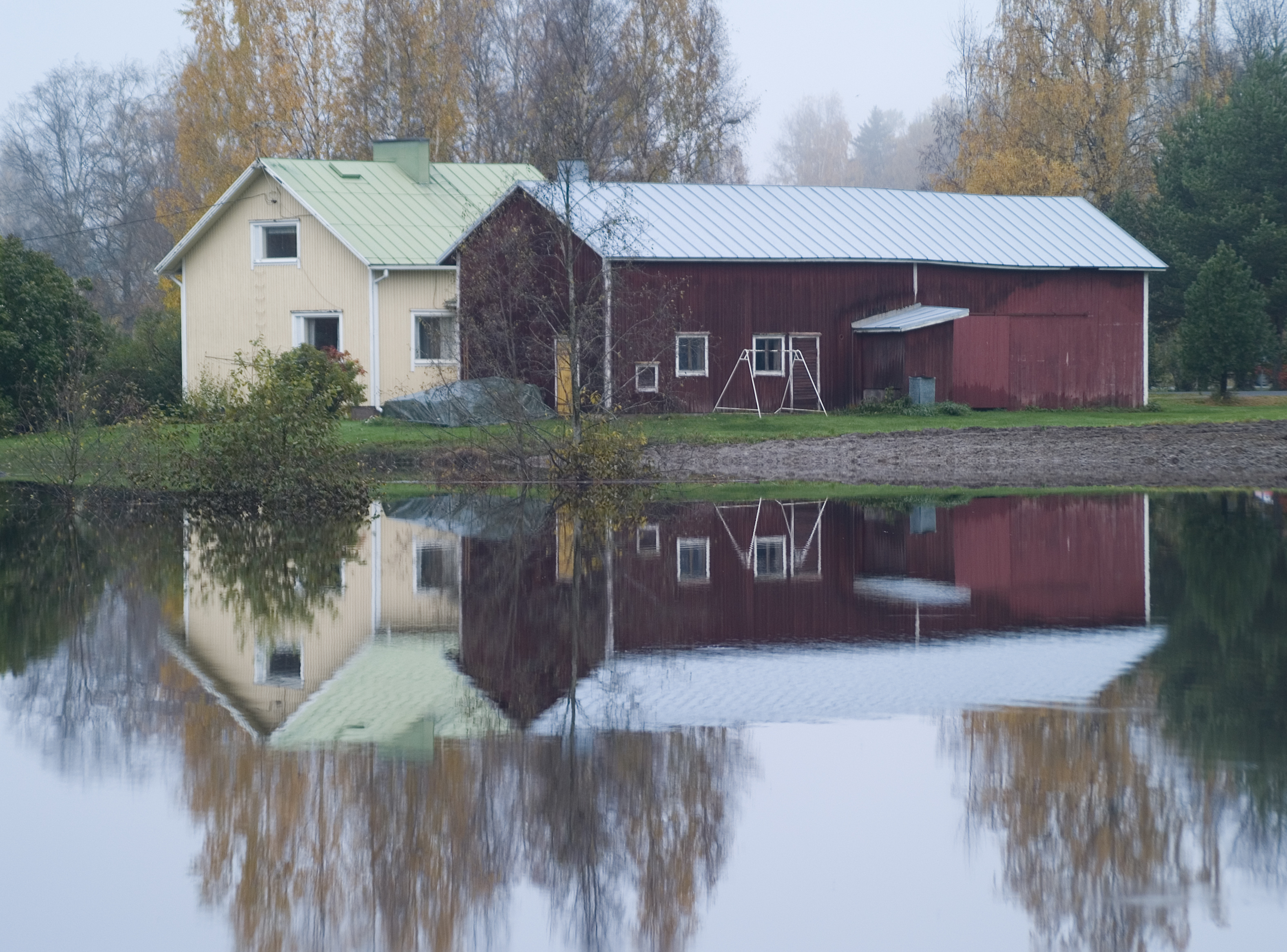
In spring time, the floods are quite typical in Ostrobothnia, a flat-lying area in Finland. A flood-surrounded house in Ilmajoki, South Ostrobothnia.

Floods can happen on flat or low-lying areas when water is supplied by rainfall or snowmelt more rapidly than it can either infiltrate or run off. The excess accumulates in place, sometimes to hazardous depths. Surface soil can become saturated, which effectively stops infiltration, where the water table is shallow, such as a floodplain, or from intense rain from one or a series of storms. Infiltration also is slow to negligible through frozen ground, rock, concrete, paving, or roofs. Areal flooding begins in flat areas like floodplains and in local depressions not connected to a stream channel, because the velocity of overland flow depends on the surface slope. Endorheic basins may experience areal flooding during periods when precipitation exceeds evaporation.

=== River flooding ===
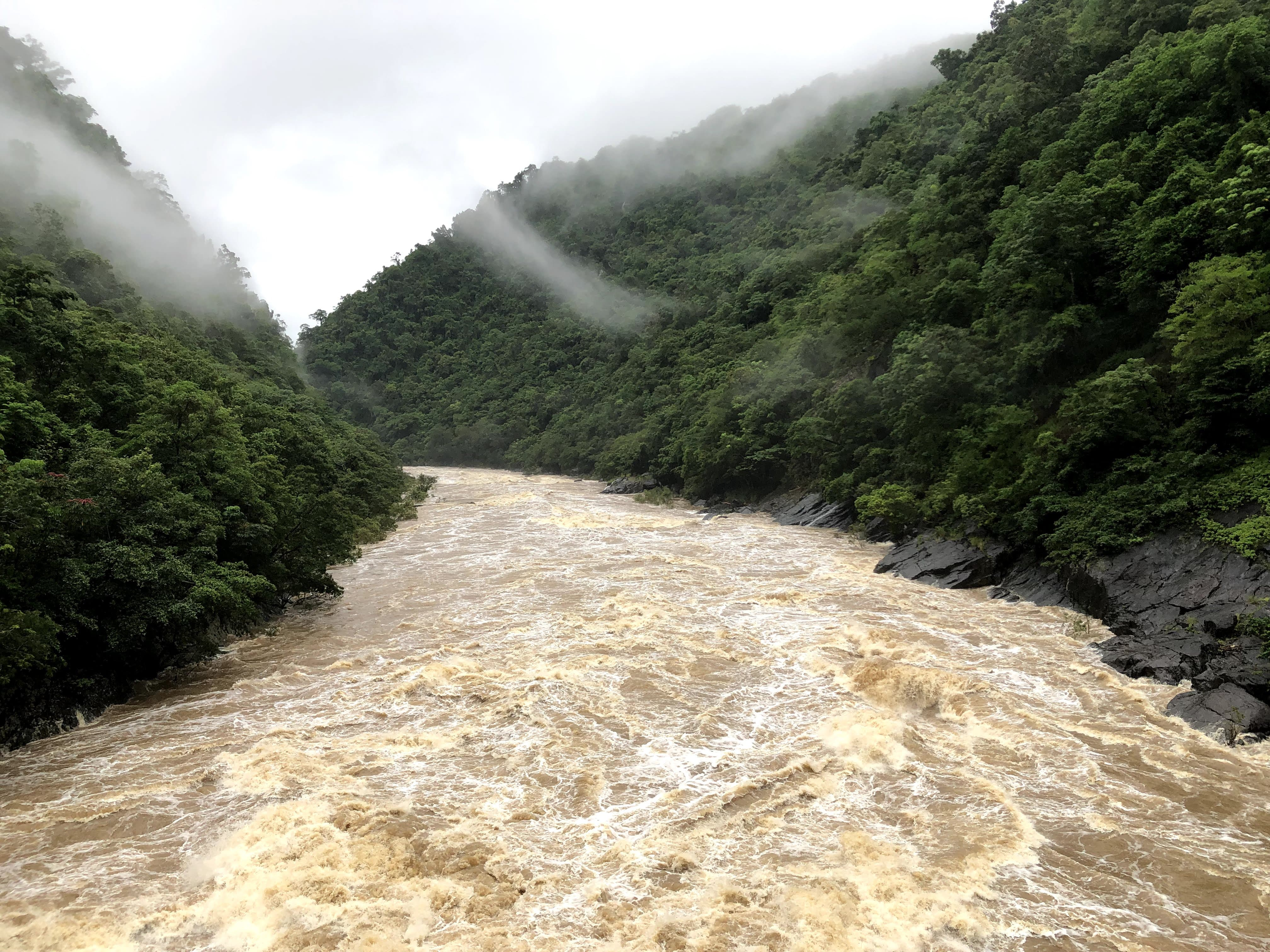
January 27 Baron River Flooding, Cairns

Floods occur in all types of river and stream channels, from the smallest ephemeral streams in humid zones to normally-dry channels in arid climates to the world's largest rivers. When overland flow occurs on tilled fields, it can result in a muddy flood where sediments are picked up by run off and carried as suspended matter or bed load. Localized flooding may be caused or exacerbated by drainage obstructions such as landslides, ice, debris, or beaver dams.

Slow-rising floods most commonly occur in large rivers with large catchment areas. The increase in flow may be the result of sustained rainfall, rapid snow melt, monsoons, or tropical cyclones. However, large rivers may have rapid flooding events in areas with dry climates, since they may have large basins but small river channels, and rainfall can be very intense in smaller areas of those basins.

In extremely flat areas, such as the Red River Valley of the North in Minnesota, North Dakota, and Manitoba, a type of hybrid river/areal flooding can occur, known locally as "overland flooding". This is different from "overland flow" defined as "surface runoff". The Red River Valley is a former glacial lakebed, created by Lake Agassiz, and over a length of 550 mi (890 km), the river course drops only 236 ft (72 m), for an average slope of about 5 inches per mile (or 8.2 cm per kilometer). In this very large area, spring snowmelt happens at different rates in different places, and if winter snowfall was heavy, a fast snowmelt can push water out of the banks of a tributary river so that it moves overland, to a point further downstream in the river or completely to another streambed. Overland flooding can be devastating because it is unpredictable, it can occur very suddenly with surprising speed, and in such flat land it can run for miles. It is these qualities that set it apart from simple "overland flow".

Rapid flooding events, including flash floods, more often occur on smaller rivers, rivers with steep valleys, rivers that flow for much of their length over impermeable terrain, or normally-dry channels. The cause may be localized convective precipitation (intense thunderstorms) or sudden release from an upstream impoundment created behind a dam, landslide, or glacier. In one instance, a flash flood killed eight people enjoying the water on a Sunday afternoon at a popular waterfall in a narrow canyon. Without any observed rainfall, the flow rate increased from about 50 to 1,500 cubic feet per second (1.4 to 42 m^{3}/s) in just one minute. Two larger floods occurred at the same site within a week, but no one was at the waterfall on those days. The deadly flood resulted from a thunderstorm over part of the drainage basin, where steep, bare rock slopes are common and the thin soil was already saturated.

Flash floods are the most common flood type in normally-dry channels in arid zones, known as arroyos in the southwest United States and many other names elsewhere. In that setting, the first flood water to arrive is depleted as it wets the sandy stream bed. The leading edge of the flood thus advances more slowly than later and higher flows. As a result, the rising limb of the hydrograph becomes ever quicker as the flood moves downstream, until the flow rate is so great that the depletion by wetting soil becomes insignificant.

=== Coastal flooding ===
Coastal areas may be flooded by storm surges combining with high tides and large wave events at sea, resulting in waves over-topping flood defenses or in severe cases by tsunami or tropical cyclones. A storm surge, from either a tropical cyclone or an extratropical cyclone, falls within this category. A storm surge is "an additional rise of water generated by a storm, over and above the predicted astronomical tides". Due to the effects of climate change (e.g. sea level rise and an increase in extreme weather events) and an increase in the population living in coastal areas, the damage caused by coastal flood events has intensified and more people are being affected.

Flooding in estuaries is commonly caused by a combination of storm surges caused by winds and low barometric pressure and large waves meeting high upstream river flows.

=== Urban flooding ===
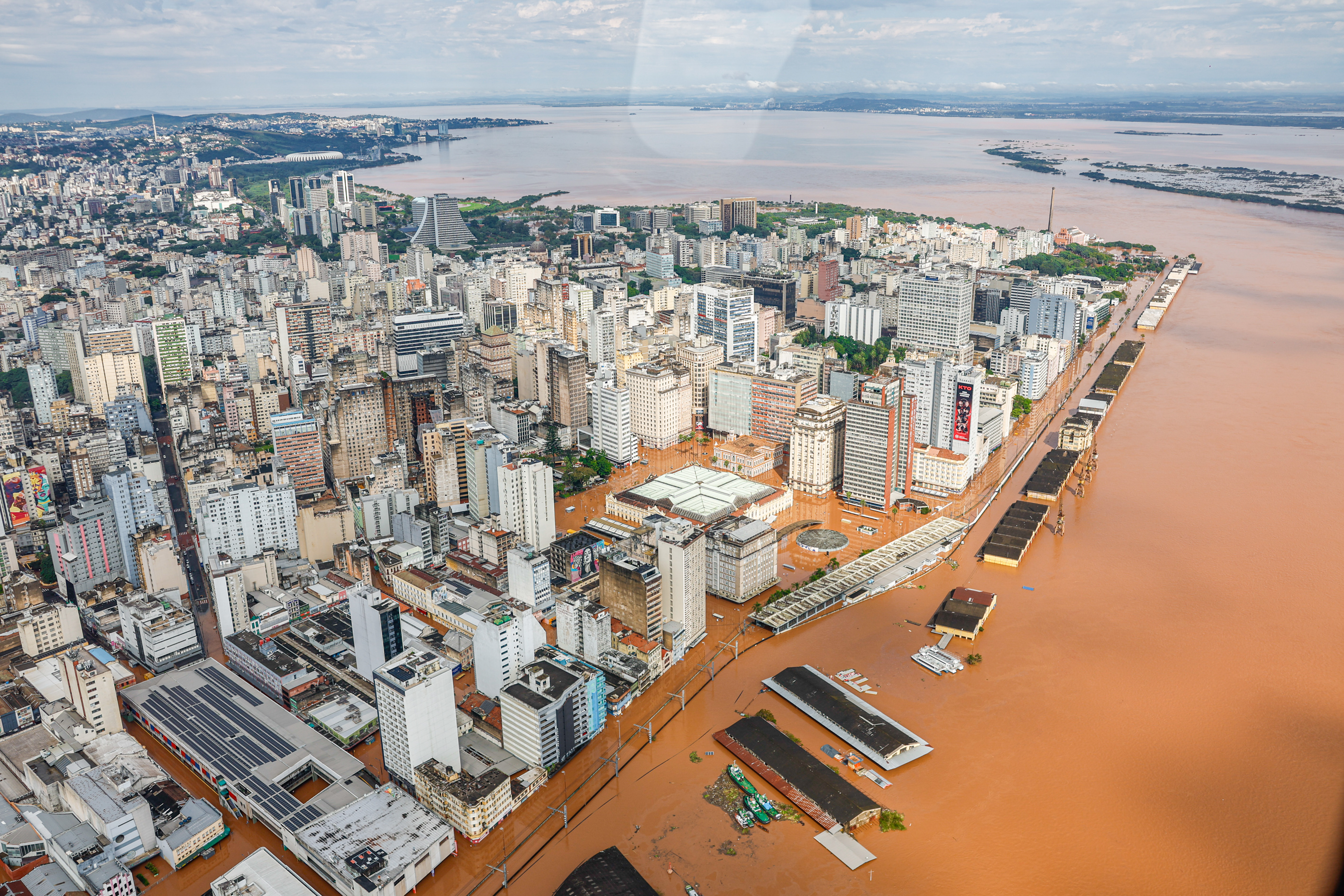
Flooding in Porto Alegre of the Lagoa dos Patos in Brazil during May 2024

Urban flooding is the inundation of land or property in cities or other built environment, caused by rainfall or coastal storm surges overwhelming the capacity of drainage systems, such as storm sewers. Urban flooding can occur regardless of whether or not affected communities are located within designated floodplains or near any body of water. It is triggered for example by an overflow of rivers and lakes, flash flooding or snowmelt. During the flood, stormwater or water released from damaged water mains may accumulate on property and in public rights-of-way. It can seep through building walls and floors, or backup into buildings through sewer pipes, cellars, toilets and sinks.

There are several types of urban flooding, each with a different cause. City planners distinguish pluvial flooding (flooding caused by heavy rain), fluvial flooding (caused by a nearby river overflowing its banks), or coastal flooding (often caused by storm surges). Urban flooding is a hazard to both the population and infrastructure. Some well known disaster events include the inundations of Nîmes (France) in 1998 and Vaison-la-Romaine (France) in 1992, the flooding of New Orleans (United States) in 2005, and the flooding in Rockhampton, Bundaberg, Brisbane during the 2010–2011 Queensland floods in Australia, the 2022 eastern Australia floods, and more recently the 2024 Rio Grande do Sul floods in Brazil.

=== Intentional floods ===
The intentional flooding of land that would otherwise remain dry may take place for agricultural, military or river-management purposes. This is a form of hydraulic engineering. Agricultural flooding may occur in preparing paddy fields for the growing of semi-aquatic rice in many countries.

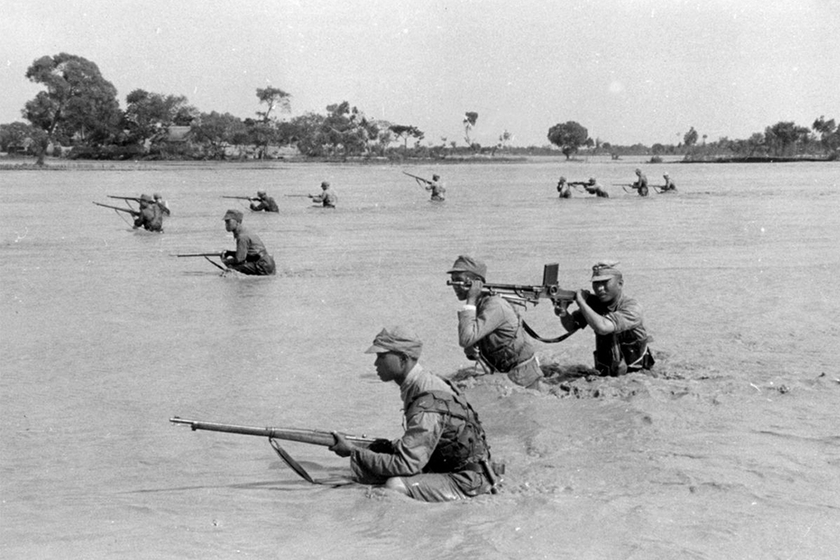
Chinese Kuomintang soldiers during the 1938 Yellow River flood

Flooding for river management may occur in the form of diverting flood waters in a river at flood stage upstream from areas that are considered more valuable than the areas that are sacrificed in this way. This may be done ad hoc, or permanently, as in the so-called overlaten (literally "let-overs"), an intentionally lowered segment in Dutch riparian levees, like the Beerse Overlaat in the left levee of the Meuse between the villages of Gassel and Linden, North Brabant.

Military inundation creates an obstacle in the field that is intended to impede the movement of the enemy. This may be done both for offensive and defensive purposes. Furthermore, in so far as the methods used are a form of hydraulic engineering, it may be useful to differentiate between controlled inundations and uncontrolled ones. Examples for controlled inundations include those in the Netherlands under the Dutch Republic and its successor states in that area and exemplified in the two Hollandic Water Lines, the Stelling van Amsterdam, the Frisian Water Line, the IJssel Line, the Peel-Raam Line, and the Grebbe line in that country.

To count as controlled, a military inundation has to take the interests of the civilian population into account, by allowing them a timely evacuation, by making the inundation reversible, and by making an attempt to minimize the adverse ecological impact of the inundation. That impact may also be adverse in a hydrogeological sense if the inundation lasts a long time.

Examples for uncontrolled inundations are the second Siege of Leiden during the first part of the Eighty Years' War, the flooding of the Yser plain during the First World War, and the Inundation of Walcheren, and the Inundation of the Wieringermeer during the Second World War).

== Causes ==
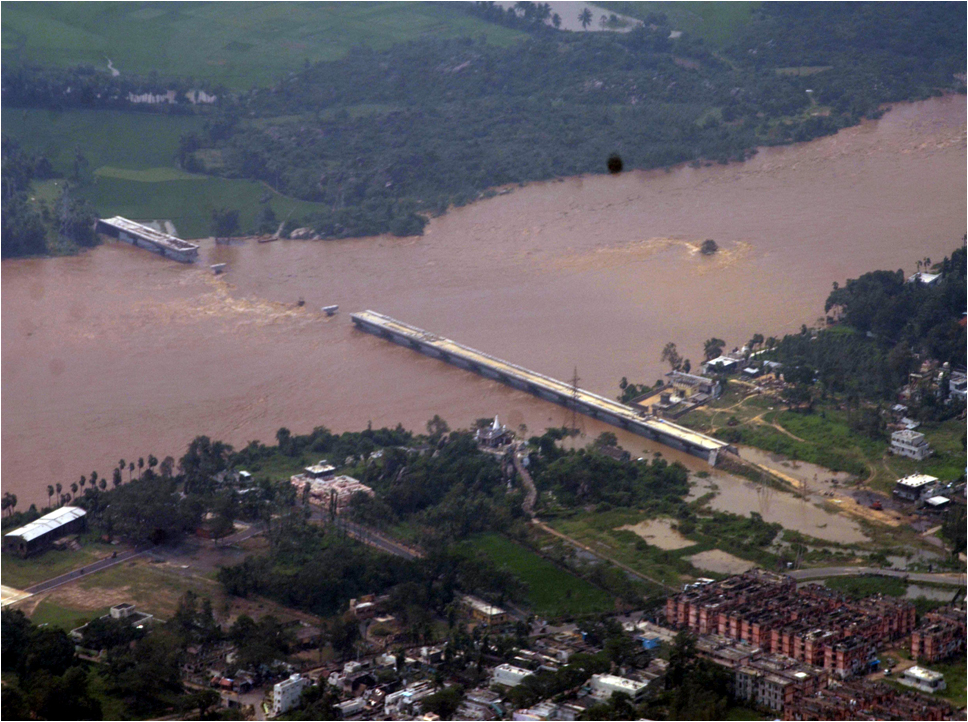
Flood due to Cyclone Hudhud in Visakhapatnam, India

Floods are caused by many factors or a combination of any of these generally prolonged heavy rainfall (locally concentrated or throughout a catchment area), highly accelerated snowmelt, severe winds over water, unusual high tides, tsunamis, or failure of dams, levees, retention ponds, or other structures that retained the water. Flooding can be exacerbated by increased amounts of impervious surface or by other natural hazards such as wildfires, which reduce the supply of vegetation that can absorb rainfall.

During times of rain, some of the water is retained in ponds or soil, some is absorbed by grass and vegetation, some evaporates, and the rest travels over the land as surface runoff. Floods occur when ponds, lakes, riverbeds, soil, and vegetation cannot absorb all the water.

This has been exacerbated by human activities such as draining wetlands that naturally store large amounts of water and building paved surfaces that do not absorb any water. Water then runs off the land in quantities that cannot be carried within stream channels or retained in natural ponds, lakes, and human-made reservoirs. About 30 percent of all precipitation becomes runoff and that amount might be increased by water from melting snow.

=== Upslope factors ===
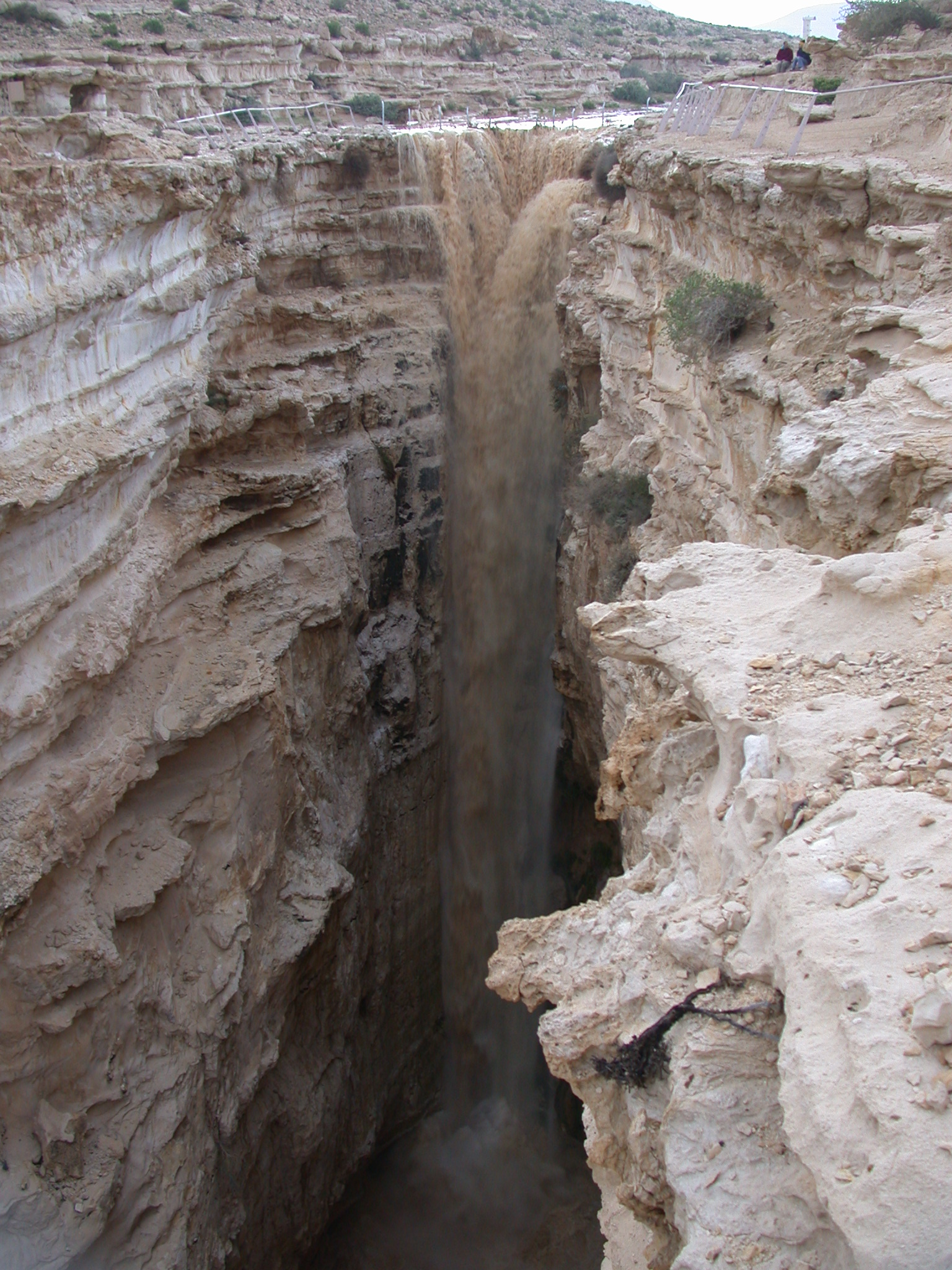
Flash flood in Ein Avdat, Negev, Israel

River flooding is often caused by heavy rain, sometimes increased by melting snow. A flood that rises rapidly, with little or no warning, is called a flash flood. Flash floods usually result from intense rainfall over a relatively small area, or if the area was already saturated from previous precipitation.

The amount, location, and timing of water reaching a drainage channel from natural precipitation and controlled or uncontrolled reservoir releases determines the flow at downstream locations. Some precipitation evaporates, some slowly percolates through soil, some may be temporarily sequestered as snow or ice, and some may produce rapid runoff from surfaces including rock, pavement, roofs, and saturated or frozen ground. The fraction of incident precipitation promptly reaching a drainage channel has been observed from nil for light rain on dry, level ground to as high as 170 percent for warm rain on accumulated snow.

Most precipitation records are based on a measured depth of water received within a fixed time interval. Frequency of a precipitation threshold of interest may be determined from the number of measurements exceeding that threshold value within the total time period for which observations are available. Individual data points are converted to intensity by dividing each measured depth by the period of time between observations. This intensity will be less than the actual peak intensity if the duration of the rainfall event was less than the fixed time interval for which measurements are reported. Convective precipitation events (thunderstorms) tend to produce shorter duration storm events than orographic precipitation. Duration, intensity, and frequency of rainfall events are important to flood prediction. Short duration precipitation is more significant to flooding within small drainage basins.

The most important upslope factor in determining flood magnitude is the land area of the watershed upstream of the area of interest. Rainfall intensity is the second most important factor for watersheds of less than approximately 30 square miles or 80 square kilometres. The main channel slope is the second most important factor for larger watersheds. Channel slope and rainfall intensity become the third most important factors for small and large watersheds, respectively.

Time of Concentration is the time required for runoff from the most distant point of the upstream drainage area to reach the point of the drainage channel controlling flooding of the area of interest. The time of concentration defines the critical duration of peak rainfall for the area of interest. The critical duration of intense rainfall might be only a few minutes for roof and parking lot drainage structures, while cumulative rainfall over several days would be critical for river basins.

=== Downslope factors ===
Water flowing downhill ultimately encounters downstream conditions slowing movement. The final limitation in coastal flooding lands is often the ocean or some coastal flooding bars which form natural lakes. In flooding low lands, elevation changes such as tidal fluctuations are significant determinants of coastal and estuarine flooding. Less predictable events like tsunamis and storm surges may also cause elevation changes in large bodies of water. Elevation of flowing water is controlled by the geometry of the flow channel and, especially, by depth of channel, speed of flow and amount of sediments in it Flow channel restrictions like bridges and canyons tend to control water elevation above the restriction. The actual control point for any given reach of the drainage may change with changing water elevation, so a closer point may control for lower water levels until a more distant point controls at higher water levels.

Effective flood channel geometry may be changed by growth of vegetation, accumulation of ice or debris, or construction of bridges, buildings, or levees within the flood channel.

Periodic floods occur on many rivers, forming a surrounding region known as the flood plain. Even when rainfall is relatively light, the shorelines of lakes and bays can be flooded by severe winds—such as during hurricanes—that blow water into the shore areas.

=== Climate change ===
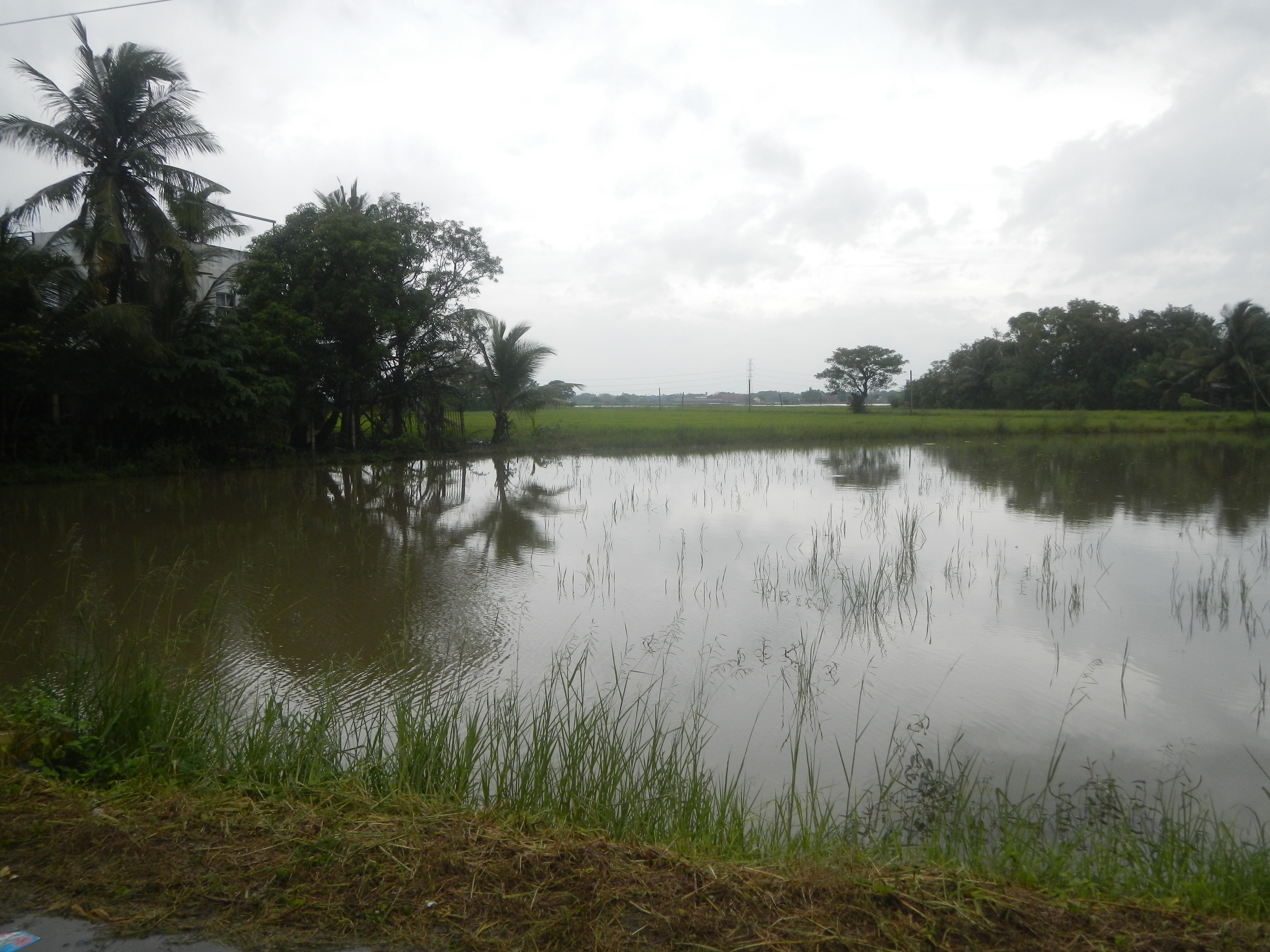
High tide flooding is increasing due to sea level rise, land subsidence, and the loss of natural barriers.

Long-term sea level rise occurs in addition to intermittent tidal flooding. NOAA predicts different levels of sea level rise for coastlines within a single country.

Due to an increase in heavy rainfall events, floods are likely to become more severe when they do occur. The interactions between rainfall and flooding are complex. There are some regions in which flooding is expected to become rarer. This depends on several factors. These include changes in rain and snowmelt, but also soil moisture. Climate change leaves soils drier in some areas, so they may absorb rainfall more quickly. This leads to less flooding. Dry soils can also become harder. In this case heavy rainfall runs off into rivers and lakes. This increases risks of flooding.

=== Coincidence ===
Extreme flood events often result from coincidence such as unusually intense, warm rainfall melting heavy snow pack, producing channel obstructions from floating ice, and releasing small impoundments like beaver dams. Coincident events may cause extensive flooding to be more frequent than anticipated from simplistic statistical prediction models considering only precipitation runoff flowing within unobstructed drainage channels. Debris modification of channel geometry is common when heavy flows move uprooted woody vegetation and flood-damaged structures and vehicles, including boats and railway equipment. Recent field measurements during the 2010–11 Queensland floods showed that any criterion solely based upon the flow velocity, water depth or specific momentum cannot account for the hazards caused by velocity and water depth fluctuations. These considerations ignore further the risks associated with large debris entrained by the flow motion.

== Negative impacts ==
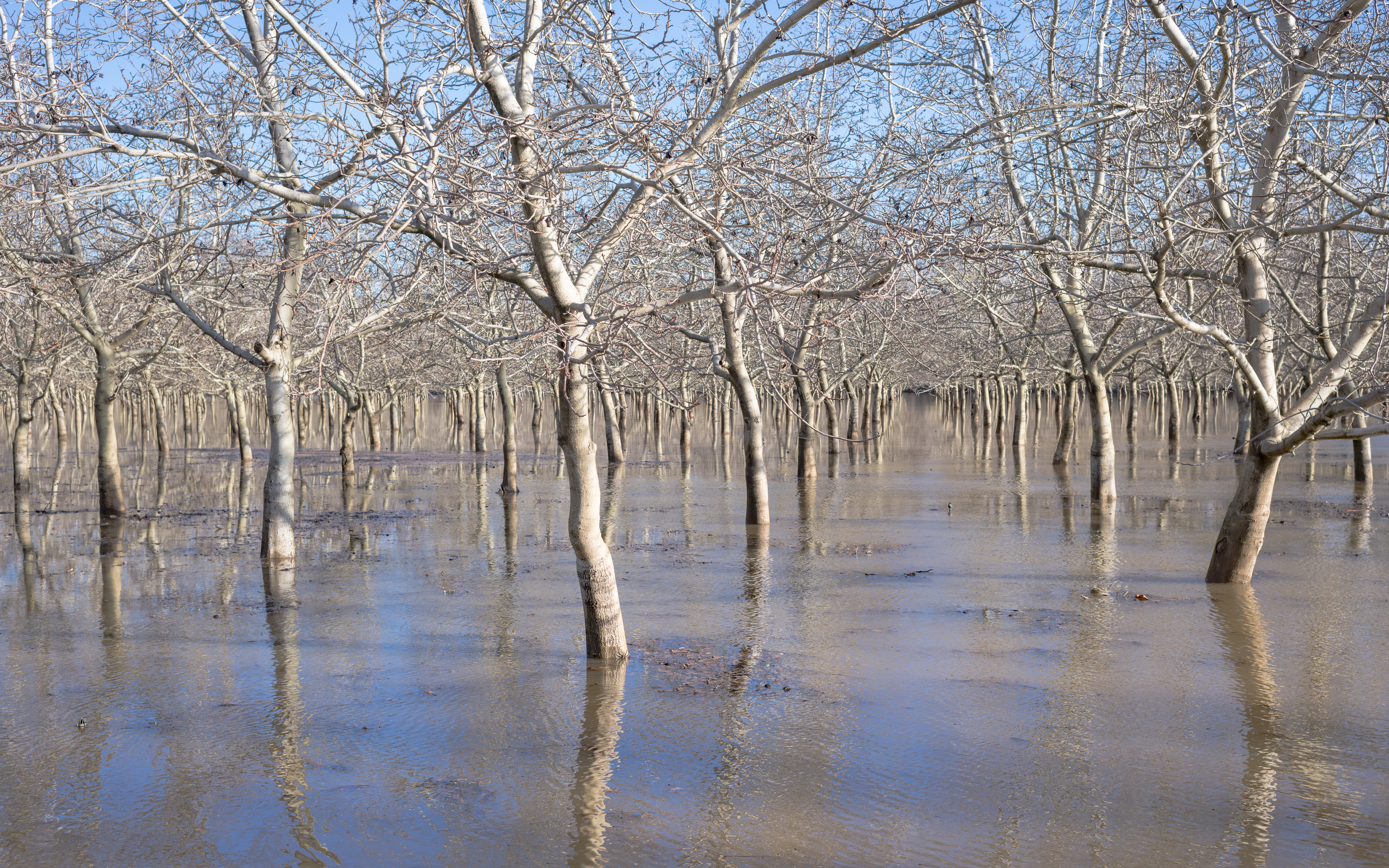
Flooded walnut orchards in Butte County after several atmospheric rivers hit California in early 2023

Floods can be a huge destructive power. When water flows, it has the ability to demolish all kinds of buildings and objects, such as bridges, structures, houses, trees, and cars. Economical, social and natural environmental damages are common factors that are impacted by flooding events and the impacts that flooding has on these areas can be catastrophic.There is an interconnectedness between floods and agriculture, climate, economy, and disease (FACED). Floods resulted in losses exceeding USD 1.5 trillion to agriculture between 1991 and 2023, representing the single most destructive hazard type for global agriculture and reflecting the widespread vulnerability of agricultural systems to water-related disasters.

=== Impacts on infrastructure and societies ===
Economic loss in agriculture and non-agricultural sectors caused by floods compared to other hazard types.

There have been numerous flood incidents around the world which have caused devastating damage to infrastructure, the natural environment and human life.

Floods can have devastating impacts to human societies. Flooding events worldwide are increasing in frequency and severity, leading to increasing costs to societies.

Catastrophic riverine flooding can result from major infrastructure failures, often the collapse of a dam. It can also be caused by drainage channel modification from a landslide, earthquake or volcanic eruption. Examples include outburst floods and lahars. Tsunamis can cause catastrophic coastal flooding, most commonly resulting from undersea earthquakes.

=== Economic impacts ===
The primary effects of flooding include loss of life and damage to buildings and other structures, including bridges, sewerage systems, roadways, and canals. The economic impacts caused by flooding can be severe.

Every year flooding causes countries billions of dollars' worth of damage that threatens the livelihood of individuals. As a result, there is also significant socio-economic threats to vulnerable populations around the world from flooding. For example, in Bangladesh in 2007, a flood was responsible for the destruction of more than one million houses. And yearly in the United States, floods cause over $7 billion in damage.

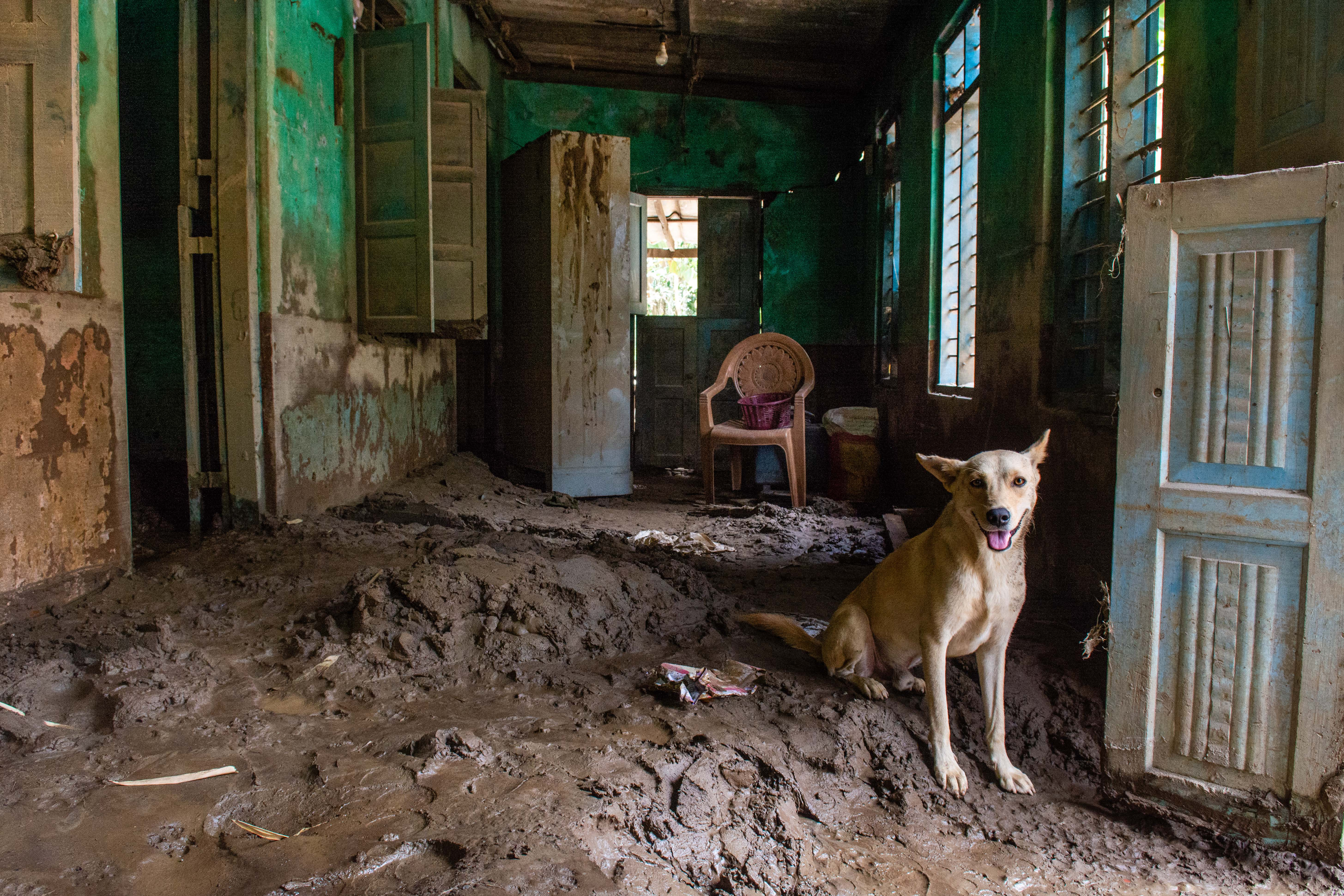
Mud was deposited in this house by flooding in the 2018 Kerala floods in India. Flooding not only creates water damage, but can also deposit large amounts of sediment.

Flood waters typically inundate farm land, making the land unworkable and preventing crops from being planted or harvested, which can lead to shortages of food both for humans and farm animals. Entire harvests for a country can be lost in extreme flood circumstances. Some tree species may not survive prolonged flooding of their root systems.

Flooding in areas where people live also has significant economic implications for affected neighborhoods. In the United States, industry experts estimate that wet basements can lower property values by 10–25 percent and are cited among the top reasons for not purchasing a home. According to the U.S. Federal Emergency Management Agency (FEMA), almost 40 percent of small businesses never reopen their doors following a flooding disaster. In the United States, insurance is available against flood damage to both homes and businesses.

Economic hardship due to a temporary decline in tourism, rebuilding costs, or food shortages leading to price increases is a common after-effect of severe flooding. The impact on those affected may cause psychological damage to those affected, in particular where deaths, serious injuries and loss of property occur.

=== Health impacts ===
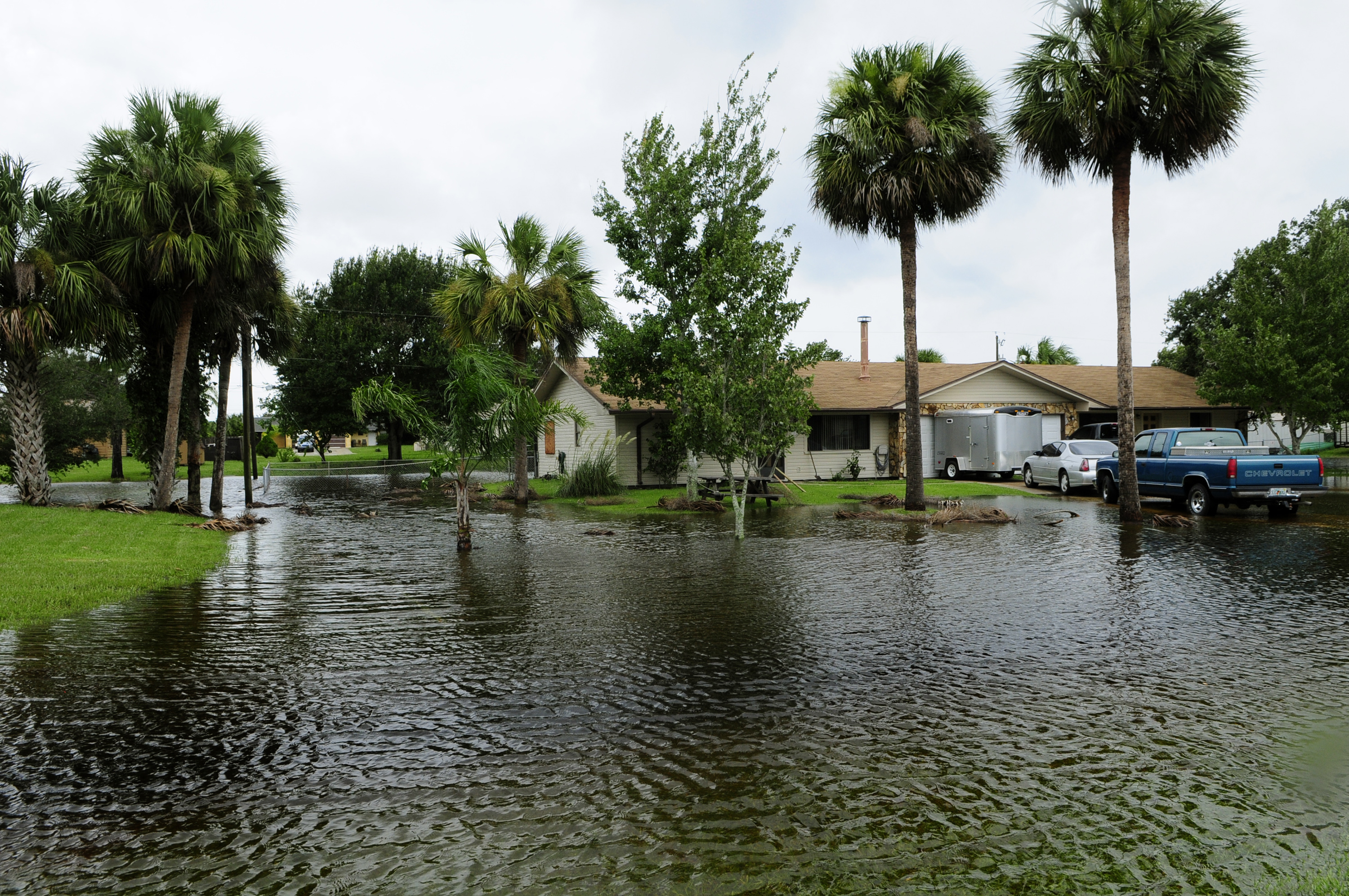
Coastal flooding in a community in Florida, United States

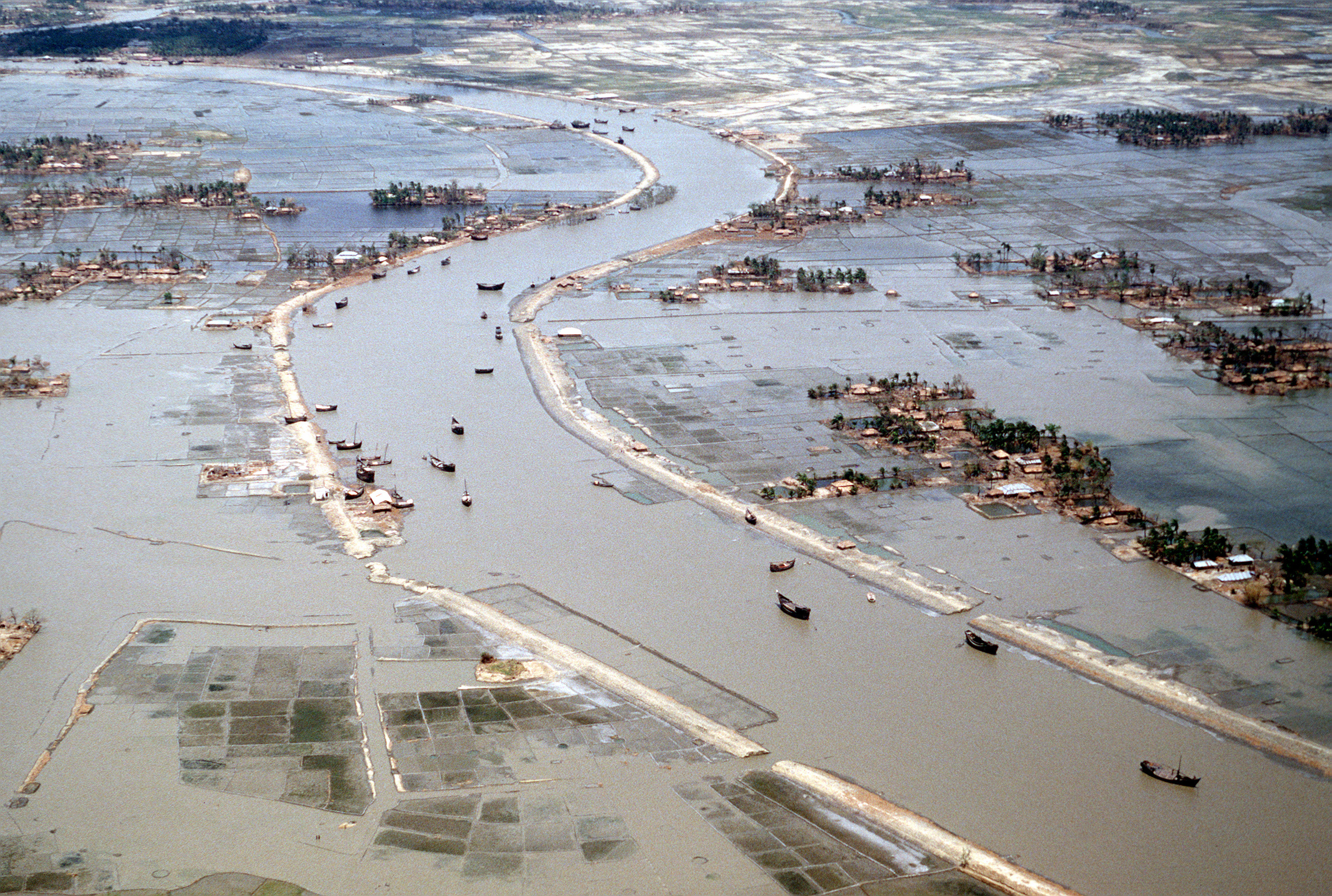
Flooding after 1991 Bangladesh cyclone, which killed around 140,000 people

Fatalities connected directly to floods are usually caused by drowning; the waters in a flood are very deep and have strong currents. Deaths do not just occur from drowning, deaths are connected with dehydration, heat stroke, heart attack and any other illness that needs medical supplies that cannot be delivered.

Injuries can lead to an excessive amount of morbidity when a flood occurs. Injuries do not just affect those who were directly in the flood: rescue teams and even people delivering supplies can sustain an injury. Injuries can occur before, during and after the flood. During floods accidents occur with falling debris or any of the many fast moving objects in the water. After the flood rescue attempts are when large numbers injuries can occur.

Communicable diseases are increased due to many pathogens and bacteria that are being transported by the water. There are many waterborne diseases such as cholera, hepatitis A, hepatitis E and diarrheal diseases, to mention a few. Gastrointestinal disease and diarrheal diseases are very common due to a lack of clean water during a flood; skin conditions can also be problematic. Clean water supplies are often contaminated when flooding occurs. Hepatitis A and E are common because of the lack of sanitation in the water and in living quarters, depending on where the flood is and how prepared the community is for a flood.

When floods hit, people can lose nearly all their crops, livestock, and food reserves and face starvation.

Floods also frequently damage power transmission and sometimes power generation, which then has knock-on effects caused by the loss of power. This includes loss of drinking water treatment and water supply, which may result in loss of drinking water or severe water contamination. It may also cause the loss of sewage disposal facilities. Lack of clean water combined with human sewage in the flood waters raises the risk of waterborne diseases, which can include typhoid, giardia, cryptosporidium, cholera and many other diseases depending upon the location of the flood.

Damage to roads and transport infrastructure may make it difficult to mobilize aid to those affected or to provide emergency health treatment.

Flooding can cause chronically wet houses, leading to the growth of indoor mold and resulting in adverse health effects, particularly respiratory symptoms. Respiratory diseases are common after the disaster has occurred. This depends on the amount of water damage and mold that grows after an incident. Research suggests that there will be an increase of 30–50% in adverse respiratory health outcomes caused by dampness and mold exposure for those living in coastal and wetland areas. Fungal contamination in homes is associated with increased allergic rhinitis and asthma. Vector-borne diseases also increase, due to the residual still water after the floods have settled. The diseases that are vector borne are malaria, dengue, West Nile, and yellow fever. Floods may have a huge impact on victims' psychosocial integrity. People suffer from a wide variety of losses and stress. One of the most treated illnesses in long-term health problems are depression caused by the flood and all the tragedy that flows with one.

==== Loss of life ====
Below is a list of the deadliest floods worldwide, showing events with death tolls at or above 100,000 individuals.

Death toll	Event	Location	Year
2,500,000–3,700,000	1931 China floods	China	1931
900,000–2,000,000	1887 Yellow River flood	China	1887
500,000–700,000	1938 Yellow River flood	China	1938
231,000	Banqiao Dam failure, result of Typhoon Nina. Approximately 86,000 people died from flooding and another 145,000 died from subsequent disease.	China	1975
230,000	2004 Indian Ocean tsunami	Indonesia	2004
145,000	1935 Yangtze river flood	China	1935
100,000+	St. Felix's flood, storm surge	Netherlands	1530
100,000	Hanoi and Red River Delta flood	North Vietnam	1971
100,000	1911 Yangtze river flood	China	1911

== Positive impacts (benefits) ==
Floods (in particular more frequent or smaller floods) can also bring many benefits, such as recharging ground water, making soil more fertile and increasing nutrients in some soils. For this reason, periodic flooding was essential to the well-being of ancient peoples along the Tigris-Euphrates Rivers, the Nile River, the Indus River, the Ganges and the Yellow River among others.

Flood waters provide much needed water resources in arid and semi-arid regions where precipitation can be very unevenly distributed throughout the year and kills pests in the farming land. Freshwater floods particularly play an important role in maintaining ecosystems in river corridors and are a key factor in maintaining floodplain biodiversity. Flooding can spread nutrients to lakes and rivers, which can lead to increased biomass and improved fisheries for a few years.

For some fish species, an inundated floodplain may form a highly suitable location for spawning, with few predators and enhanced levels of nutrients or food. Fish such as the weather fish use floods to reach new habitats. Bird populations may also profit from the boost in food production caused by flooding.

The viability of hydropower, a renewable source of energy, is also higher in flood-prone regions.

== Protections against floods and associated hazards ==
=== Flood management ===
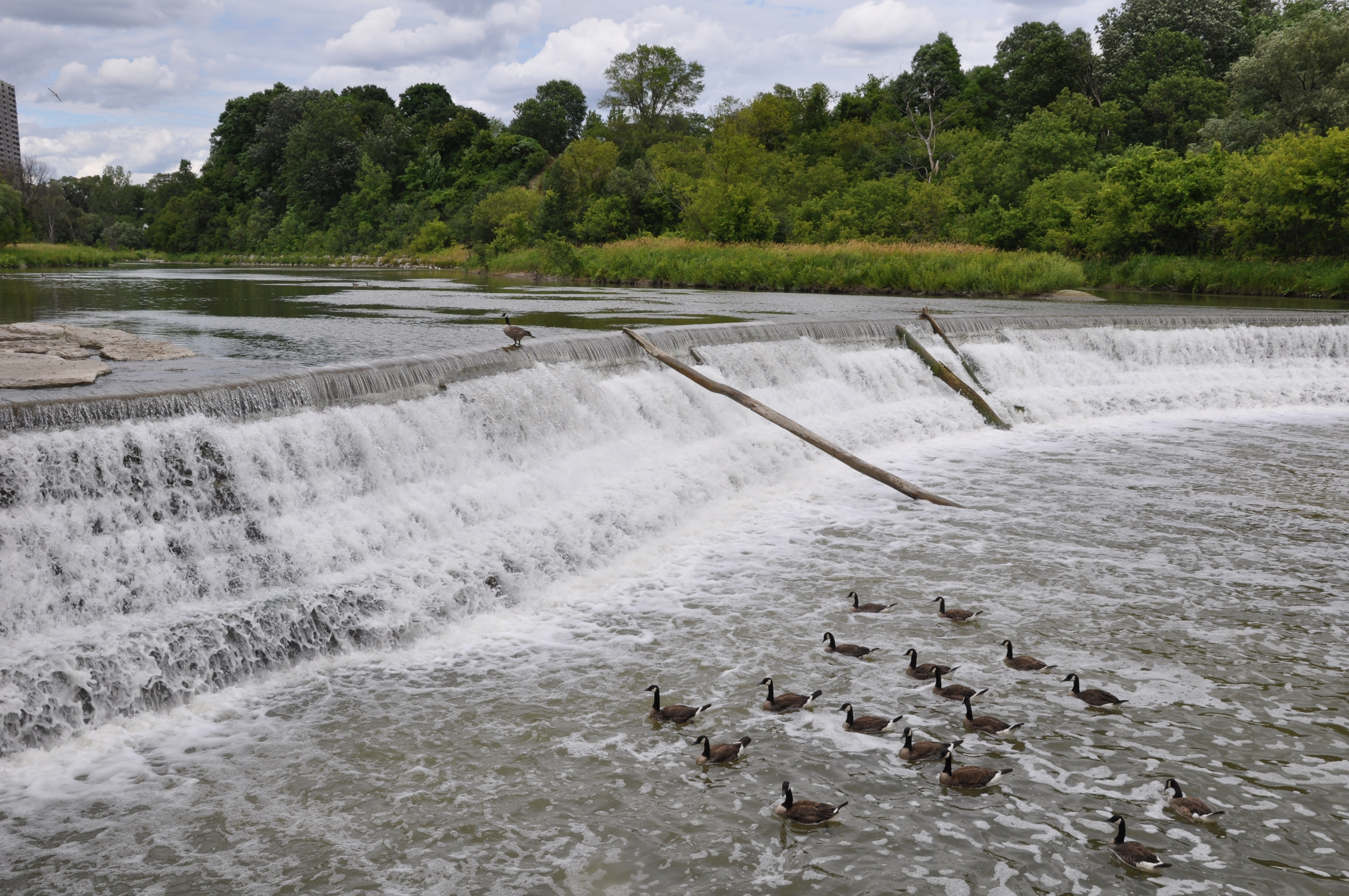
A weir was built on the Humber River (Ontario) to prevent a recurrence of a catastrophic flood.

Flood management or flood control are methods used to reduce or prevent the detrimental effects of flood waters. Flooding can be caused by a mix of both natural processes, such as extreme weather upstream, and human changes to waterbodies and runoff. Flood management methods can be either of the structural type (i.e. flood control) and of the non-structural type. Structural methods hold back floodwaters physically, while non-structural methods do not. Building hard infrastructure to prevent flooding, such as flood walls, is effective at managing flooding. However, it is best practice within landscape engineering to rely more on soft infrastructure and natural systems, such as marshes and flood plains, for handling the increase in water.

Flood management can include flood risk management, which focuses on measures to reduce risk, vulnerability and exposure to flood disasters and providing risk analysis through, for example, flood risk assessment. Flood mitigation is a related but separate concept describing a broader set of strategies taken to reduce flood risk and potential impact while improving resilience against flood events.

As climate change has led to increased flood risk an intensity, flood management is an important part of climate change adaptation and climate resilience. For example, to prevent or manage coastal flooding, coastal management practices have to handle natural processes like tides but also sea level rise due to climate change. The prevention and mitigation of flooding can be studied on three levels: on individual properties, small communities, and whole towns or cities.

==== Flood management examples ====
In many countries around the world, waterways prone to floods are often carefully managed. Defenses such as detention basins, levees, bunds, reservoirs, and weirs are used to prevent waterways from overflowing their banks. When these defenses fail, emergency measures such as sandbags or portable inflatable tubes are often used to try to stem flooding. Coastal flooding has been addressed in portions of Europe and the Americas with coastal defenses, such as sea walls, beach nourishment, and barrier islands.

In the riparian zone near rivers and streams, erosion control measures can be taken to try to slow down or reverse the natural forces that cause many waterways to meander over long periods of time. Flood controls, such as dams, can be built and maintained over time to try to reduce the occurrence and severity of floods as well. In the United States, the U.S. Army Corps of Engineers maintains a network of such flood control dams.

In areas prone to urban flooding, one solution is the repair and expansion of human-made sewer systems and stormwater infrastructure. Another strategy is to reduce impervious surfaces in streets, parking lots and buildings through natural drainage channels, porous paving, and wetlands (collectively known as green infrastructure or sustainable urban drainage systems (SUDS)). Areas identified as flood-prone can be converted into parks and playgrounds that can tolerate occasional flooding. Ordinances can be adopted to require developers to retain stormwater on site and require buildings to be elevated, protected by floodwalls and levees, or designed to withstand temporary inundation. Property owners can also invest in solutions themselves, such as re-landscaping their property to take the flow of water away from their building and installing rain barrels, sump pumps, and check valves.

=== Flood safety planning ===
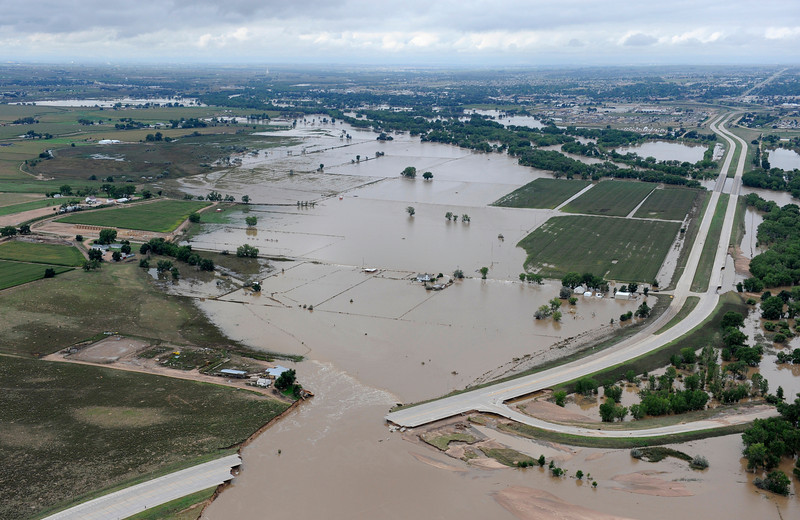
Aftermath of flooding in Colorado, 2013

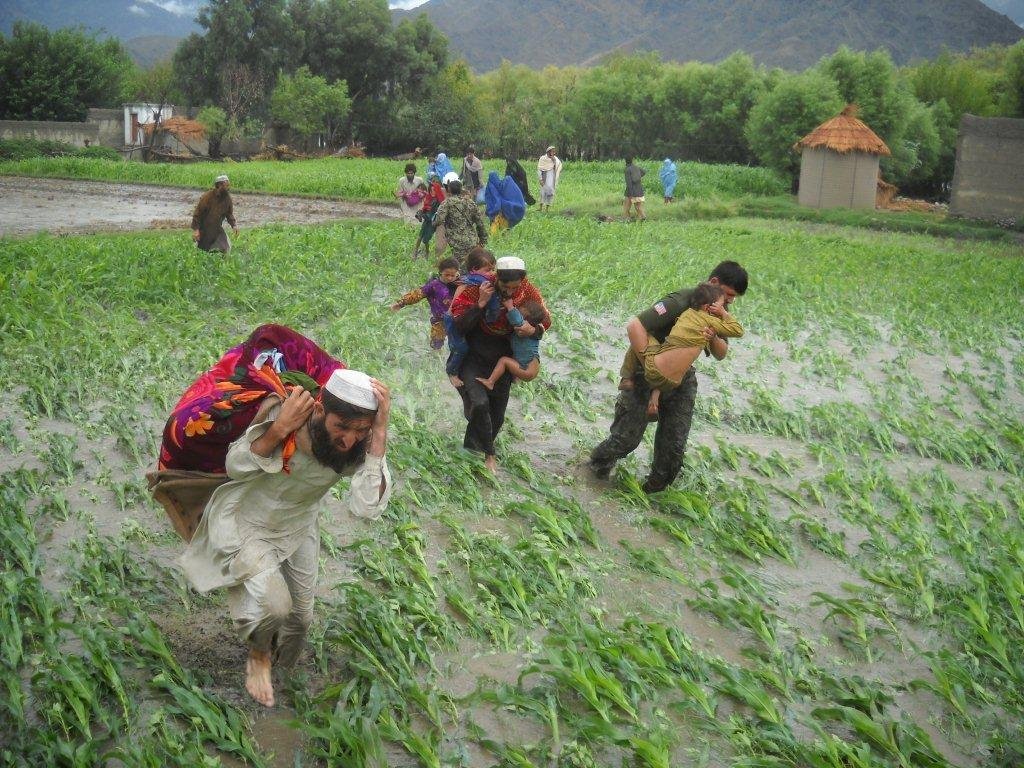
Flood rescue in Nangarhar, Afghanistan in 2010

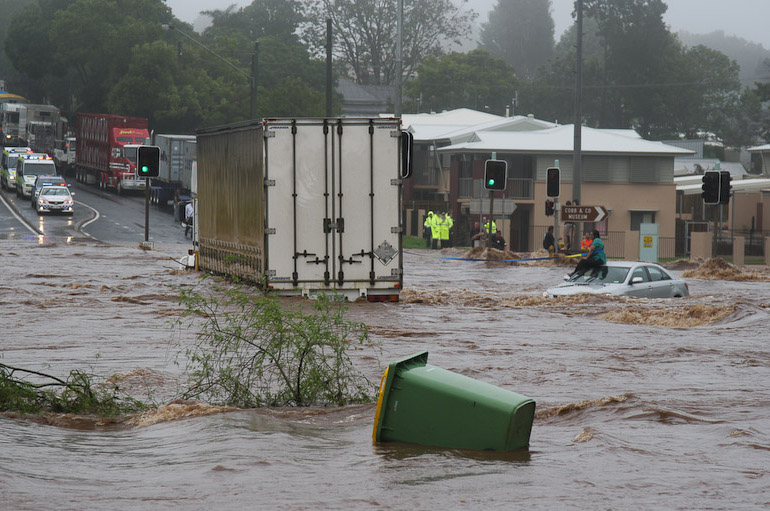
Flash flooding caused by heavy rain falling in a short amount of time

In the United States, the National Weather Service gives out the advice "Turn Around, Don't Drown" for floods; that is, it recommends that people get out of the area of a flood, rather than trying to cross it. At the most basic level, the best defense against floods is to seek higher ground for high-value uses while balancing the foreseeable risks with the benefits of occupying flood hazard zones. Critical community-safety facilities, such as hospitals, emergency-operations centers, and police, fire, and rescue services, should be built in areas least at risk of flooding. Structures, such as bridges, that must unavoidably be in flood hazard areas should be designed to withstand flooding. Areas most at risk for flooding could be put to valuable uses that could be abandoned temporarily as people retreat to safer areas when a flood is imminent.

Planning for flood safety involves many aspects of analysis and engineering, including:

- observation of previous and present flood heights and inundated areas,
- statistical, hydrologic, and hydraulic model analyses,
- mapping inundated areas and flood heights for future flood scenarios,
- long-term land use planning and regulation,
- engineering design and construction of structures to control or withstand flooding,
- intermediate-term monitoring, forecasting, and emergency-response planning, and
- short-term monitoring, warning, and response operations.

Each topic presents distinct yet related questions with varying scope and scale in time, space, and the people involved. Attempts to understand and manage the mechanisms at work in floodplains have been made for at least six millennia.

In the United States, the Association of State Floodplain Managers works to promote education, policies, and activities that mitigate current and future losses, costs, and human suffering caused by flooding and to protect the natural and beneficial functions of floodplains – all without causing adverse impacts. A portfolio of best practice examples for disaster mitigation in the United States is available from the Federal Emergency Management Agency.

=== Flood clean-up safety ===
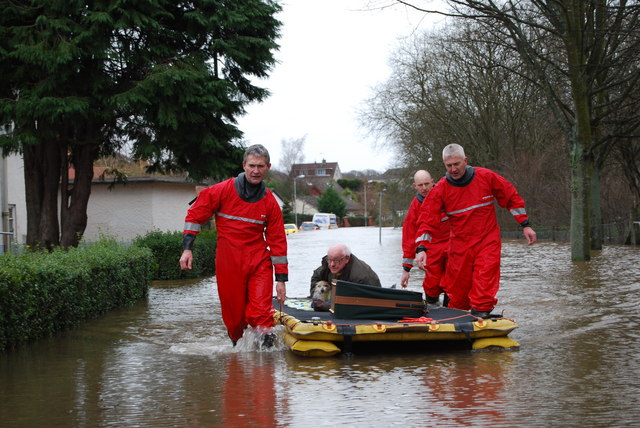
a picture insert on flood safety

Clean-up activities following floods often pose hazards to workers and volunteers involved in the effort. Potential dangers include electrical hazards, carbon monoxide exposure, musculoskeletal hazards, heat or cold stress, motor vehicle-related dangers, fire, drowning, and exposure to hazardous materials. Because flooded disaster sites are unstable, clean-up workers might encounter sharp jagged debris, biological hazards in the flood water, exposed electrical lines, blood or other body fluids, and animal and human remains. In planning for and reacting to flood disasters, managers provide workers with hard hats, goggles, heavy work gloves, life jackets, and watertight boots with steel toes and insoles.

== Flood predictions ==
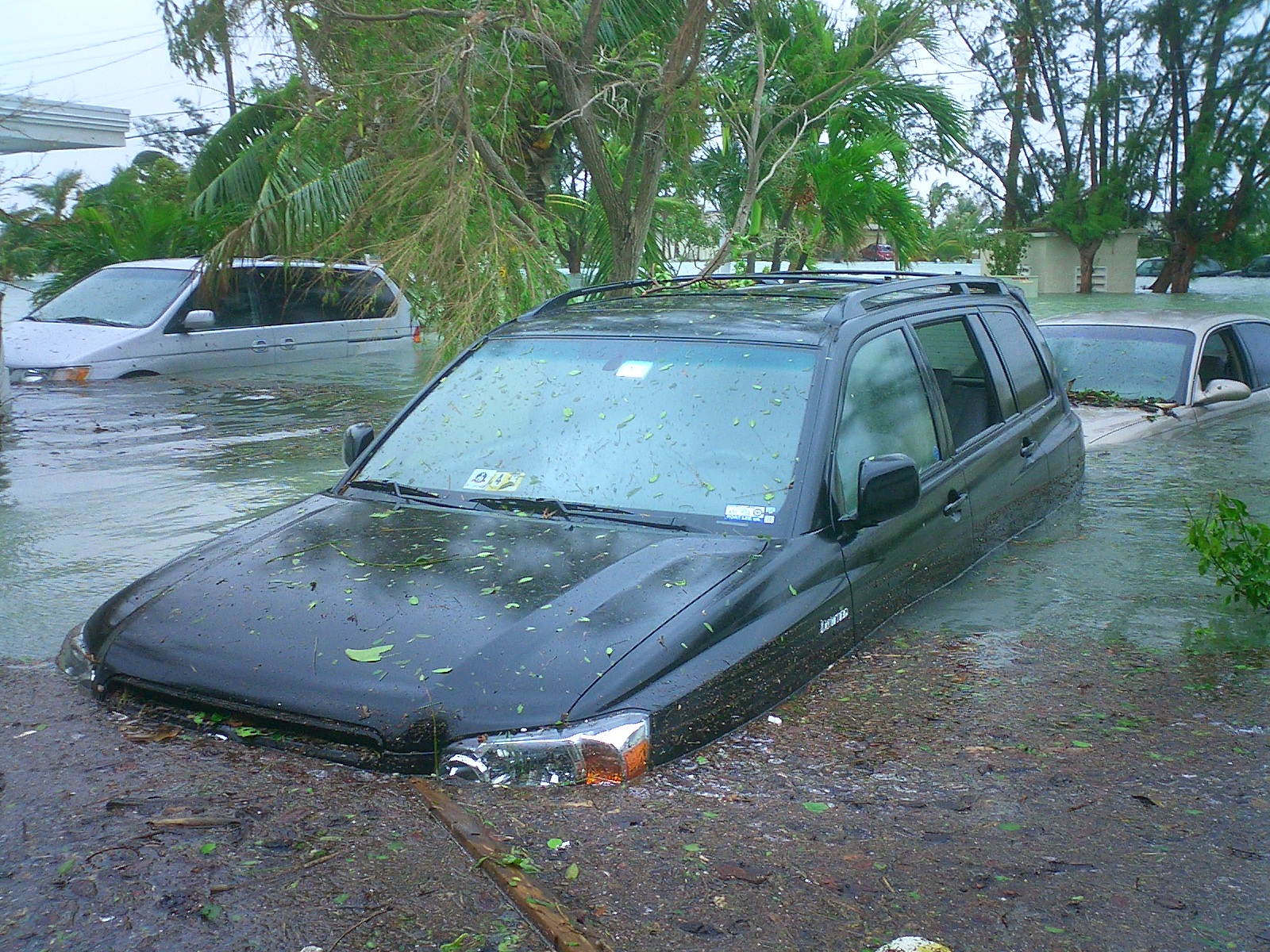
Flooding near Key West, Florida, United States from Hurricane Wilma's storm surge in October 2005

A series of annual maximum flow rates in a stream reach can be analyzed statistically to estimate the 100-year flood and floods of other recurrence intervals there. Similar estimates from many sites in a hydrologically similar region can be related to measurable characteristics of each drainage basin to allow indirect estimation of flood recurrence intervals for stream reaches without sufficient data for direct analysis.

Physical process models of channel reaches are generally well understood and will calculate the depth and area of inundation for given channel conditions and a specified flow rate, such as for use in floodplain mapping and flood insurance. Conversely, given the observed inundation area of a recent flood and the channel conditions, a model can calculate the flow rate. Applied to various potential channel configurations and flow rates, a reach model can contribute to selecting an optimum design for a modified channel. Various reach models are available as of 2015, either 1D models (flood levels measured in the channel) or 2D models (variable flood depths measured across the extent of a floodplain). HEC-RAS, the Hydraulic Engineering Center model, is among the most popular software, if only because it is available free of charge. Other models such as TUFLOW, CREST-iMAP, and Inunda combine 1D and 2D components to derive flood depths across both river channels and the entire floodplain.

Physical process models of complete drainage basins are even more complex. Although many processes are well understood at a point or for a small area, others are poorly understood at all scales, and process interactions under normal or extreme climatic conditions may be unknown. Basin models typically combine land-surface process components (to estimate how much rainfall or snowmelt reaches a channel) with a series of reach models. For example, a basin model can calculate the runoff hydrograph that might result from a 100-year storm, although the recurrence interval of a storm is rarely equal to that of the associated flood. Basin models are commonly used in flood forecasting and warning, as well as in analysis of the effects of land use change and climate change.

In the United States, an integrated approach to real-time hydrologic computer modelling uses observed data from the U.S. Geological Survey (USGS), various cooperative observing networks, various automated weather sensors, the NOAA National Operational Hydrologic Remote Sensing Center (NOHRSC), various hydroelectric companies, etc. combined with quantitative precipitation forecasts (QPF) of expected rainfall and/or snow melt to generate daily or as-needed hydrologic forecasts. The NWS also cooperates with Environment Canada on hydrologic forecasts that affect both the US and Canada, like in the area of the Saint Lawrence Seaway.

The Global Flood Monitoring System, "GFMS", a computer tool which maps flood conditions worldwide, is available online. Users anywhere in the world can use GFMS to determine when floods may occur in their area. GFMS uses precipitation data from NASA's Earth observing satellites and the Global Precipitation Measurement satellite, "GPM". Rainfall data from GPM is combined with a land surface model that incorporates vegetation cover, soil type, and terrain to determine how much water is soaking into the ground, and how much water is flowing into streamflow.

Users can view statistics for rainfall, streamflow, water depth, and flooding every 3 hours, at each 12-kilometer gridpoint on a global map. Forecasts for these parameters are 5 days into the future. Users can zoom in to see inundation maps (areas estimated to be covered with water) in 1-kilometer resolution.

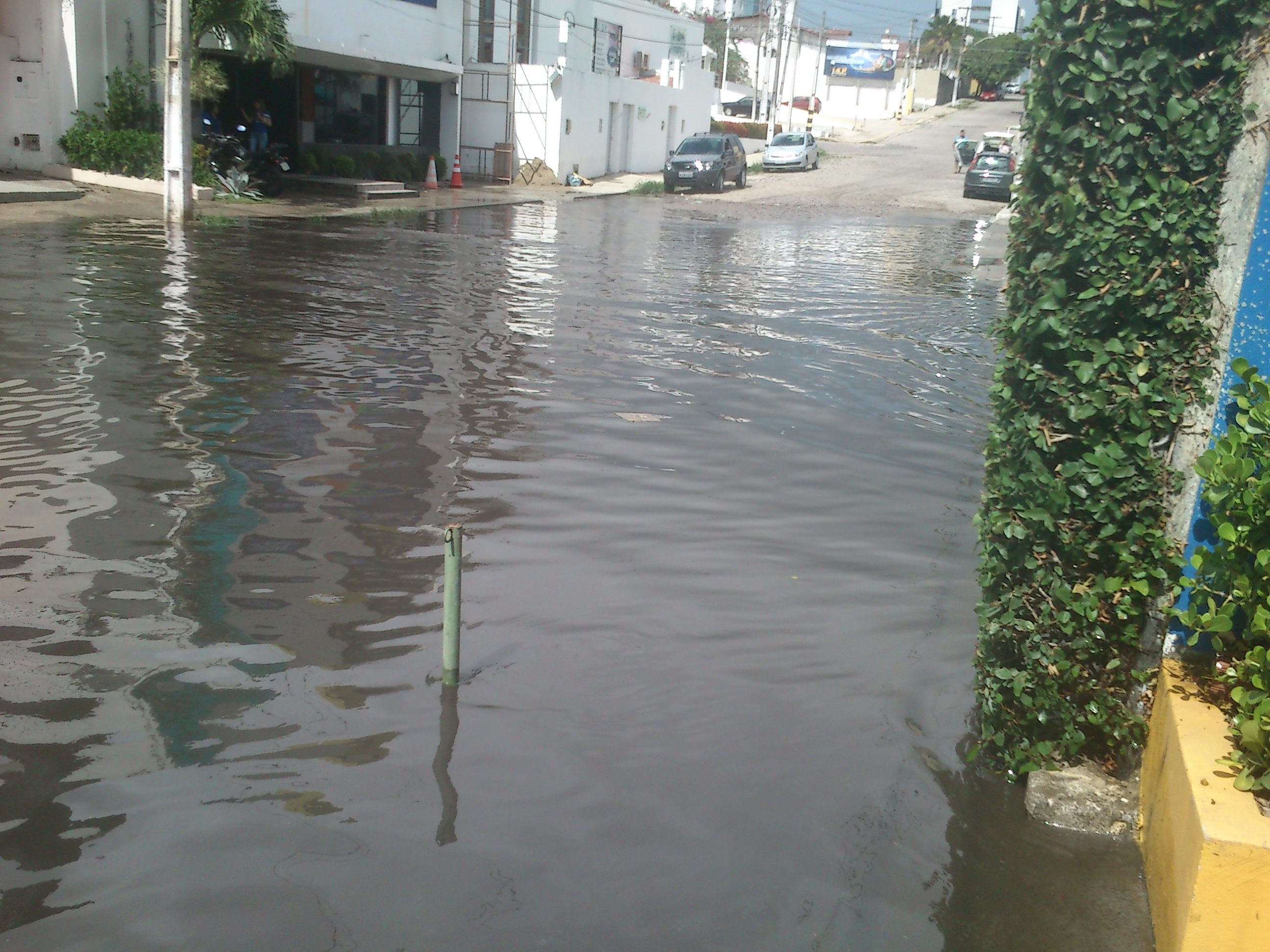
Flooding in a street of Natal, Rio Grande do Norte, Brazil in April 2013

Anticipating floods before they occur allows for precautions to be taken and people to be warned so that they can be prepared in advance for flooding conditions. For example, farmers can remove animals from low-lying areas and utility services can put in place emergency provisions to re-route services if needed. Emergency services can also make provisions to have enough resources available ahead of time to respond to emergencies as they occur. People can evacuate areas to be flooded.

In order to make the most accurate flood forecasts for waterways, it is best to have a long time-series of historical data that relates stream flows to measured past rainfall events. Coupling this historical information with real-time knowledge about volumetric capacity in catchment areas, such as spare capacity in reservoirs, ground-water levels, and the degree of saturation of area aquifers is also needed in order to make the most accurate flood forecasts.

Radar estimates of rainfall and general weather forecasting techniques are also important components of good flood forecasting. In areas where good quality data is available, the intensity and height of a flood can be predicted with fairly good accuracy and plenty of lead time. The output of a flood forecast is typically a maximum expected water level and the likely time of its arrival at key locations along a waterway, and it also may allow for the computation of the likely statistical return period of a flood. In many developed countries, urban areas at risk of flooding are protected against a 100-year flood – that is a flood that has a probability of around 63% (i.e. 1 − 0.99^{100}, or roughly 1 − 1/e) of occurring in any 100-year period of time.

According to the U.S. National Weather Service (NWS) Northeast River Forecast Center (RFC) in Taunton, Massachusetts, a rule of thumb for flood forecasting in urban areas is that it takes at least 1 inch (25 mm) of rainfall in around an hour's time in order to start significant ponding of water on impermeable surfaces. Many NWS RFCs routinely issue Flash Flood Guidance and Headwater Guidance, which indicate the general amount of rainfall that would need to fall in a short period of time in order to cause flash flooding or flooding on larger water basins.

=== Flood risk assessment ===
Flood risks can be defined as the risk that floods pose to individuals, property and the natural landscape based on specific hazards and vulnerability. The extent of flood risks can impact the types of mitigation strategies required and implemented.

A large amount of the world's population lives in close proximity to major coastlines, while many major cities and agricultural areas are located near floodplains. There is significant risk for increased coastal and fluvial flooding due to changing climatic conditions.

== Examples by country or region ==
- Worldwide: List of floods
- Africa: List of floods#Africa
- Asia: List of floods#Asia
- Europe: List of floods in Europe
  - North Sea: Storm tides of the North Sea
  - The Netherlands: Floods in the Netherlands, Flood control in the Netherlands
- Oceania: List of floods#Oceania
  - Australia: Floods in Australia
- United States: Lists of floods in the United States

== Society and culture ==
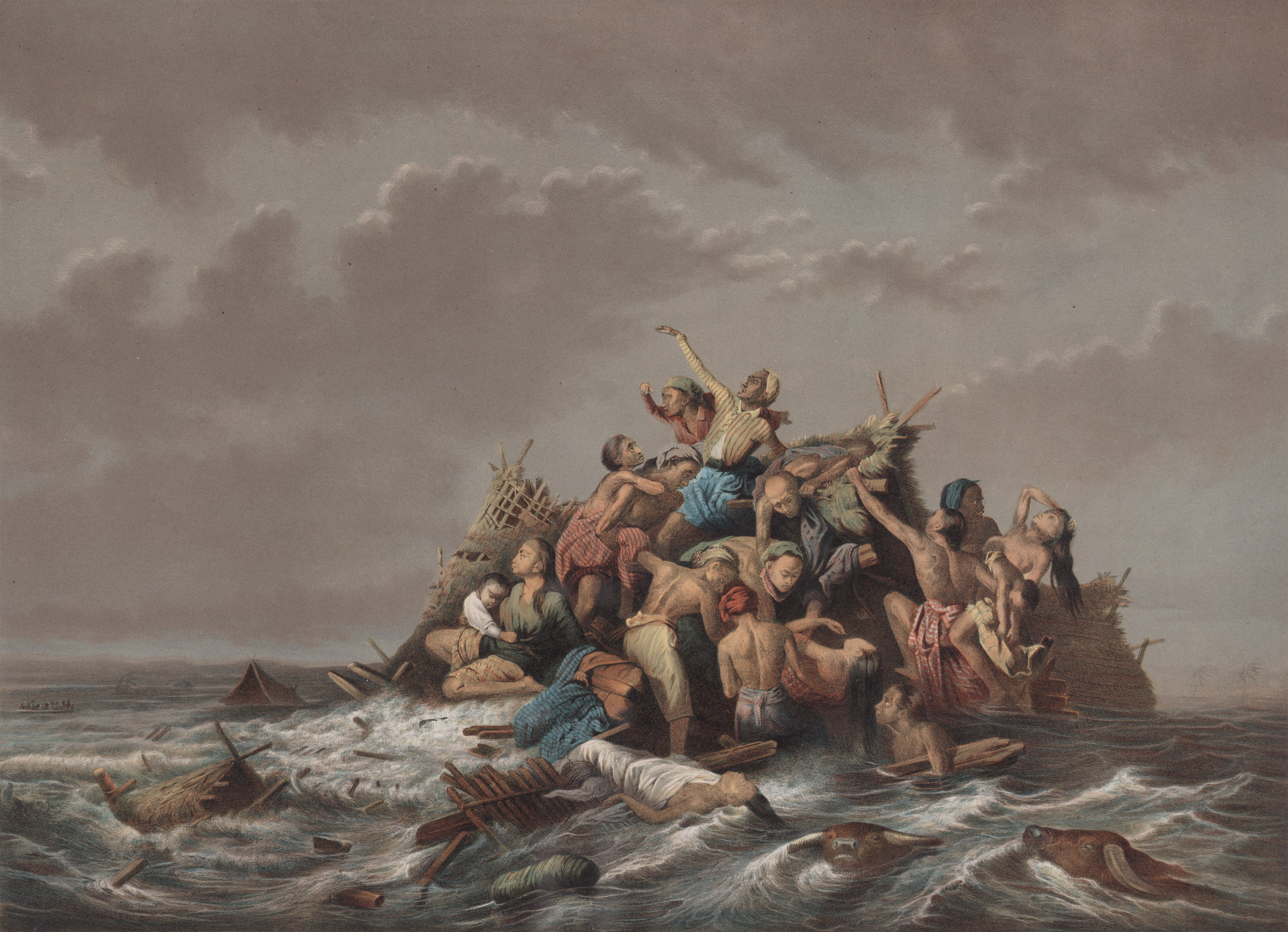
People seeking refuge from flood in Java, c. 1865–1876

=== Myths and religion ===
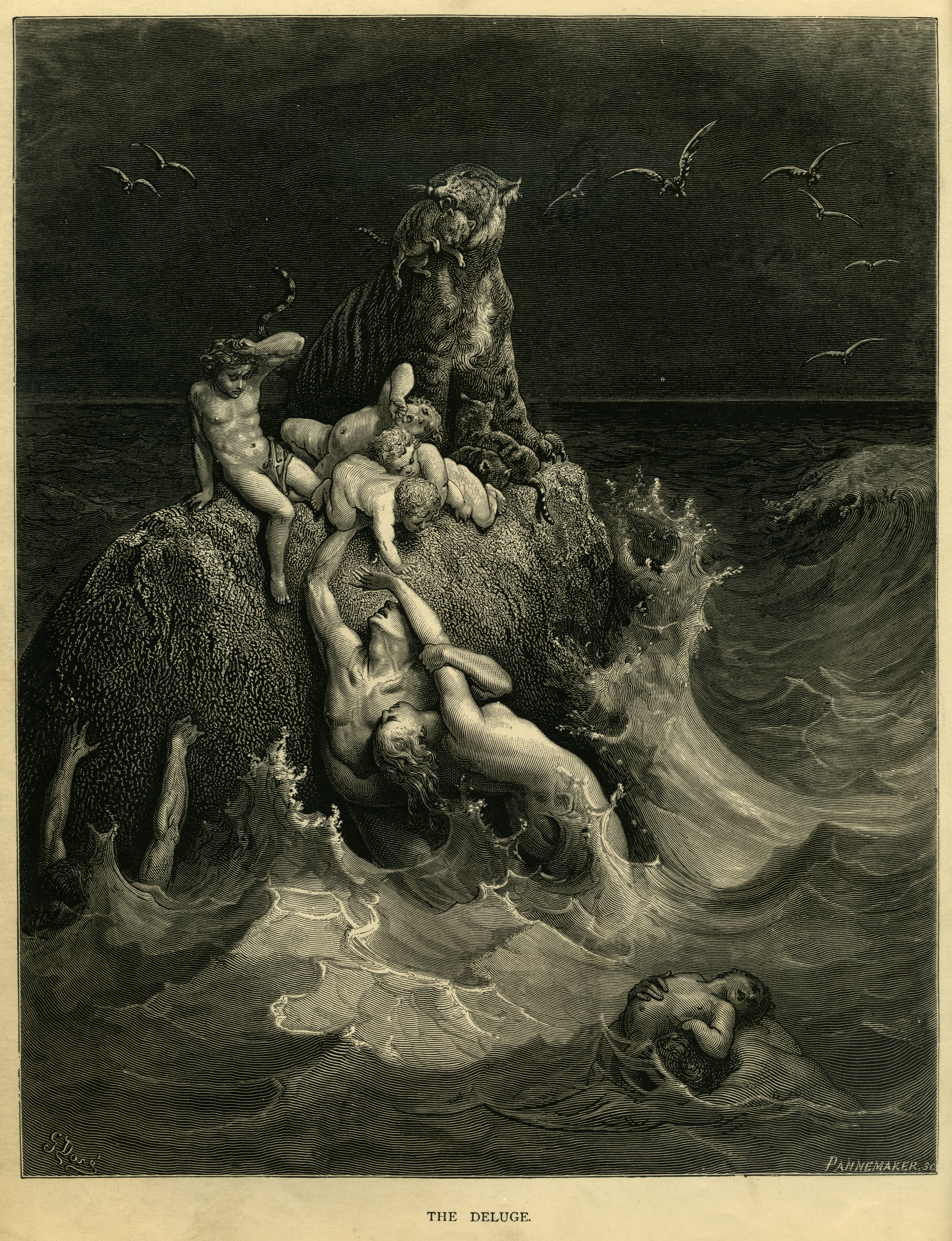
"The Deluge", frontispiece to Gustave Doré's illustrated edition of the Bible

A flood myth or a deluge myth is a narrative in which a great flood—usually sent by one or more deities—destroys civilization, typically as an act of divine retribution. Parallels are often drawn between the floodwaters of these myths and the primordial cosmic ocean that appears in certain creation myths, because the floodwaters are described as a means of social cleansing or purifying humanity of its corruption, for example, in preparation for rebirth. Most flood myths also feature a culture hero who "represents the human craving for life".

The oldest known narrative of a divinely initiated flood originates from the Sumerian culture in Mesopotamia, among others expressed in the Akkadian Atra-Hasis epic, which dates to the 18th century BCE. Comparable flood narratives appear in many other cultures, including the biblical Genesis flood narrative, manvantara-sandhya in Hinduism, Deucalion in Greek mythology, and in Indigenous North American cultures.

== See also ==
- Disaster response – Second phase of the disaster management cycle
- Diversion dam – Dam that diverts some flow of a river
- Emergency management – Dealing with all humanitarian aspects of emergencies
- Flood alert – Weather warning indicating areal flooding has been observed or is imminent
- Mudflow – Form of mass wasting

== Sources ==
This article incorporates text from a free content work. Licensed under CC BY 4.0 (license statement/permission). Text taken from The Impact of Disasters on Agriculture and Food Security 2025, The Food and Agriculture Organization of the United Nations.
