= Effects of flooding on skin =

Health effects of flooding

In the event of a flood, many residents and emergency personal are exposed to unclean water, which can result in several different types of skin conditions. Flood waters contain pathogens and chemicals from coming in contact with raw sewage, oil, gasoline, and household chemicals such as paints (sometimes lead based) and insecticides. A major concern is large scale, unintentional release of contaminants from industrial, superfund, or agricultural sites. The unknown severity of floodwater contamination can raise concerns for skin infections, inflammation, as well as psychological stress-related skin diseases.

== Dermatological manifestations ==
=== Communicable diseases ===
Both bacterial and fungal skin infections have been reported after floodwater exposure. The risk of infection is increased with traumatic injury to the skin and also in people with certain underlying conditions such as diabetes, chronic venous insufficiency and immunosuppression. Staphylococcal and Streptococcal organisms remain the most common causes of superficial infection after a flooding event. Exposure to floodwaters is associated with increased risk of infection from atypical bacteria such as vibrio vulnificus and mycobacterium marinum when exposed to saltwater and aeromonas when exposed to contaminated freshwater. People with liver cirrhosis or immunosuppression are at an increased risk of developing severe disease with vibrio and aeromonas infections. Fungal infections such as tinea corporis have also been reported especially in warm humid climates.

=== Contact dermatitis ===
Contact dermatitis occurs when the skin comes into contact with chemicals that cause a reaction, often redness, swelling or itchiness. Flood water often contains chemicals such as pesticides, bleach, and detergents from industries or households that can cause such a reaction.

=== Traumatic injuries ===
Flood water can increase the potential risks for traumatic injuries from concealed objects picked up in the water. This includes sharp objects (metals, glass, sticks), rocks, electrical hazards (broken power lines) and animals that can be displaced from the flood waters.

=== Other manifestations ===
Additionally, psychological stress associated with a flooding event can lead to psycho-emotional aggravated primary skin disease, which exacerbates pre existing skin diseases such as: atopic dermatitis, alopecia areata, and psoriasis.

== Prevention ==
In systems already stressed by the natural disaster, the potential morbidity associated with skin infections or reactions can be life-threatening and is preventable with limited-exposure and post-exposure safety measures are taken.

Centers for Disease Control and Prevention recommendations:

- Avoiding contact with flood waters if one has an open wound.
- Covering clean, open wounds with a waterproof bandage to reduce the chance of infection.
- Keeping open wounds as clean as possible by washing well with soap and clean water.
- If a wound develops redness, swelling, or oozing, one should seek immediate medical care.
