= Aquifer storage and recovery =

Injection of water into an aquifer for later use

Aquifer storage and recovery (ASR) is the direct injection of surface water supplies such as potable water, reclaimed water (i.e. rainwater), or river water into an aquifer for later recovery and use. The injection and extraction is often done by means of a well. In areas where the rainwater cannot percolate the soil or where it is not capable of percolating it fast enough (i.e. urban areas) and where the rainwater is thus diverted to rivers, rainwater ASR could help to keep the rainwater within an area. ASR is used for municipal, industrial and agricultural purposes.

== In the United States ==
=== Colorado ===
The first ASR well with a downhole control valve was installed in Highlands Ranch, Colorado, in 1992 for Centennial Water and Sanitation District. Since then, over 40 ASR wells have been installed for many different municipalities. These wells range in depths from 1,000 ft (300 m) to 3,000 ft (910 m) below ground surface, with injection rates commonly between 100 US gal (380 L; 83 imp gal) and 500 US gal (1,900 L; 420 imp gal) per minute (gpm) per well.

=== Florida ===
The use of ASR in Florida has been examined to determine potential benefits for the Everglades and other Floridian water systems under the Comprehensive Everglades Restoration Plan (CERP). An estimate of 333 ASR wells would be implemented as part of CERP and used to store, treat and supply excess surface water to the Everglades and other systems of water during dry periods.

As of 2004, doubts remained about the benefit of introducing ASR in such large capacity to Florida due to a predominantly karst geography. Current or potential problems include: (1) poor recovery due to mixing of the injected fresh water with the existing brackish to saline water in the aquifer; (2) pre-existing quality of water introduced to ASR; and (3) potential risk of resulting water quality due to mixing of injected freshwater and existing aquifer.

=== Oregon ===
The first agriculture ASR wells were put into service in Oregon in the autumn of 2006 and have injected well over 3,000 acre-feet (3,700,000 m^{3}) of water during the winter and spring flood flow times using artificial recharge (AR) of flood water as their water source. This shallow recharged water is then recovered as potable water and injected into the deep basalt aquifer.

During the injection process, electrical energy can be generated by the head pressure of the water flowing back into the aquifer. This stored water is recovered during late summer and early autumn for irrigation needs.

Both of these well types use a down-hole control valve. ASR can also be used to re-inject water used by HVAC systems to maintain the ground water levels and store the thermal differences from summertime cooling for winter time heating. Industry can also capture cold winter waters and store it for summertime use and avoid the need for cooling water in the summer for industrial processes. This may also free up short supplies of summer time water for other beneficial uses. This reinjection process may also avoid the cost of surface disposal and avoid the increased thermal load to the rivers and streams during the summer air conditioning season.

=== Texas ===
As of 2014, the Texan cities of El Paso, Kerrville and San Antonio used ASR, providing water resources to these water-vulnerable communities. A University of Florida report ranked daily per-capita water availability for 225 large urban areas across the U.S. The study weighed fresh water available to cities from naturally occurring and constructed sources such as reservoirs, aquifers and imports. Of the cities reviewed, San Antonio ranked last, or most vulnerable, and El Paso ranked as 10th-worst, though other Texas cities made the list.

San Antonio stores drinking water in its Carrizo ASR facility, which contains more than 91,000 acre-feet of water and has a maximum capacity of 120,000 acre-feet.

A 2010 Texas Water Development Board (TWDB) survey of Texas water utilities found four primary objections to ASR in other parts of Texas: legal and physical limitations, the quality of the recovered water, cost-effectiveness and the potential for other pumpers to capture the utility's stored water.

== Virginia ==
In the Hampton Roads region, the Virginia Beach–Chesapeake–Norfolk metropolitan area, treated waste water is pumped back into the Potomac Aquifer, to limit the existing sinking and prevent saltwater contamination.

== In Australia ==
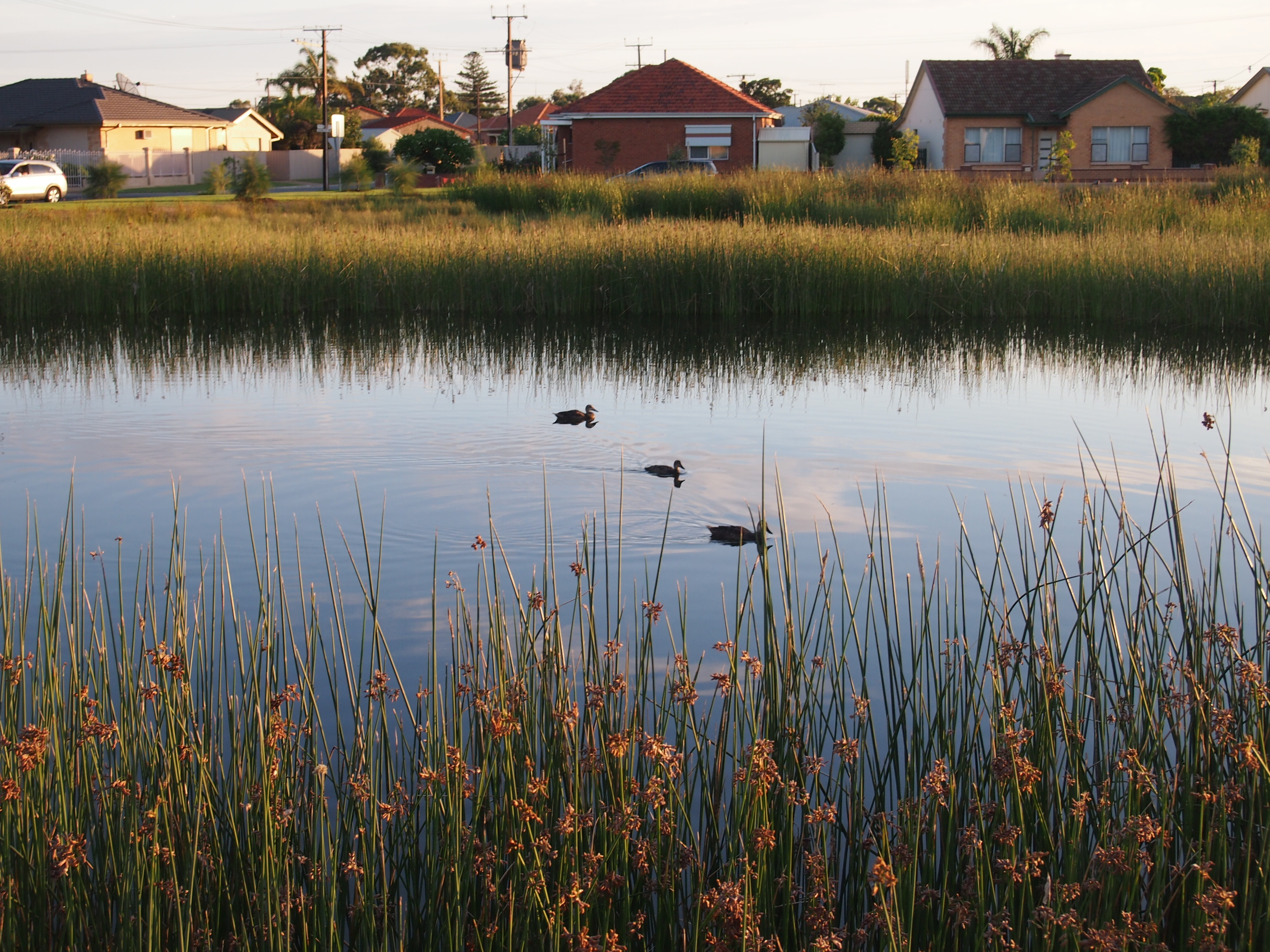
Newly constructed wetland for final stage treatment of urban stormwater runoff for an ASR scheme in western Adelaide, South Australia

In South Australia, the City of Salisbury in northern Adelaide has since 1994 played a pioneering role in establishing the viability of the capture and treatment of urban stormwater runoff within artificial wetlands, and injecting the treated water into Tertiary aquifers in winter, for later use by industry, and for irrigation of city parks and school playing fields in summer. In 2009 the capacity of the Salisbury ASR schemes was around 5 gigalitres per annum (expected to rise to 14 GL by 2014) and this success has led to other local government areas across Adelaide undertaking similar ASR projects.

== In Europe ==
In Spain, the SubSol ASR project is active and in the Netherlands, there is the COASTAR project.

== See also ==
- Acre-foot
- Groundwater recharge
- Groundwater banking
