= Open space =

Open space may refer to:

In architecture, urban planning and conservation ethics:

- Open plan, a generic term used in interior design for any floor plan, especially in workspaces, which makes use of large, open spaces and minimizes the use of small, enclosed rooms
- Landscape, areas of land without human-built structures
- Open space reserve, areas of protected or conserved land on which development is indefinitely set aside
- Urban open space, urban areas of protected or conserved land on which development is indefinitely set aside
- Greenway (landscape), a linear chain of open space reserves or a recreational corridor through the same
- Public space, areas left open for the use of the public, such as a piazza, plaza, park, and courtyard

In business:

- Open Space Technology, a procedure for conducting a business conference

In other uses:

- Open Space (band), an indie rock band from Minsk, Belarus
- Open Space (Italy), a faction within the Italian political party The People of Freedom
- Open Space (magazine), magazine of the Open Spaces Society in the UK
- Open Space (TV programme), a BBC TV programme produced by their Community Programme Unit
- Open Space (publications), a music publishing collective
- Open Space Theatre, a defunct London theatre run by Charles Marowitz
- Open Space Technology, a method for organizing a participant-driven conference

== See also ==
- Outer space
- Floor area ratio
