= Frisian Waterline =

Defence line

- Netherlands
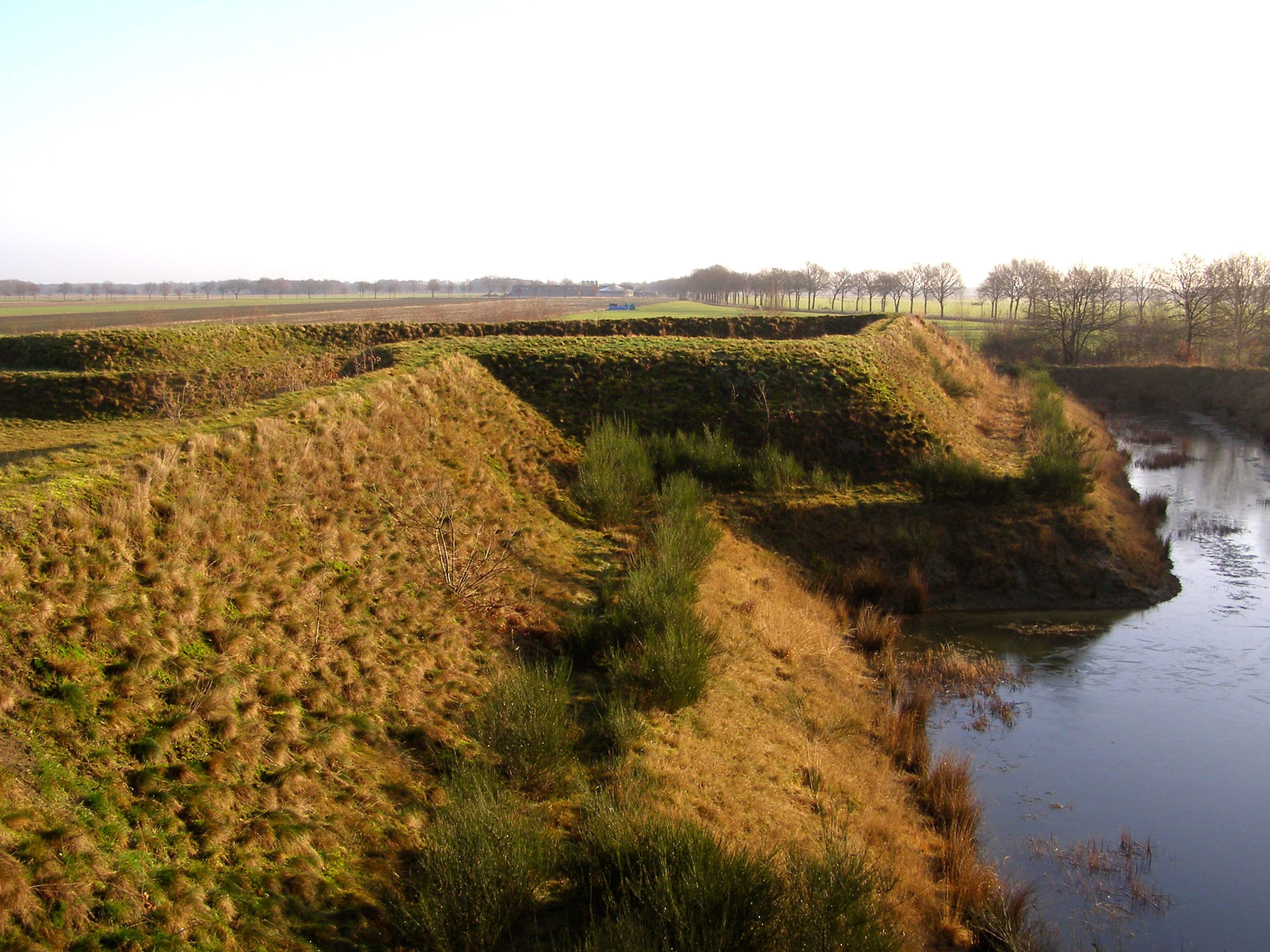
- Zwartendijksterschans (Fort)

Site information
- Type: Defensive line
- Controlled by: Netherlands
- Open to the public: Yes
- Condition: In restoration

Site history
- Built: started in 1580
- In use: 16th & 17th century
- Materials: Flooded plains, earth wall forts
- Battles/wars: Eighty Years' War

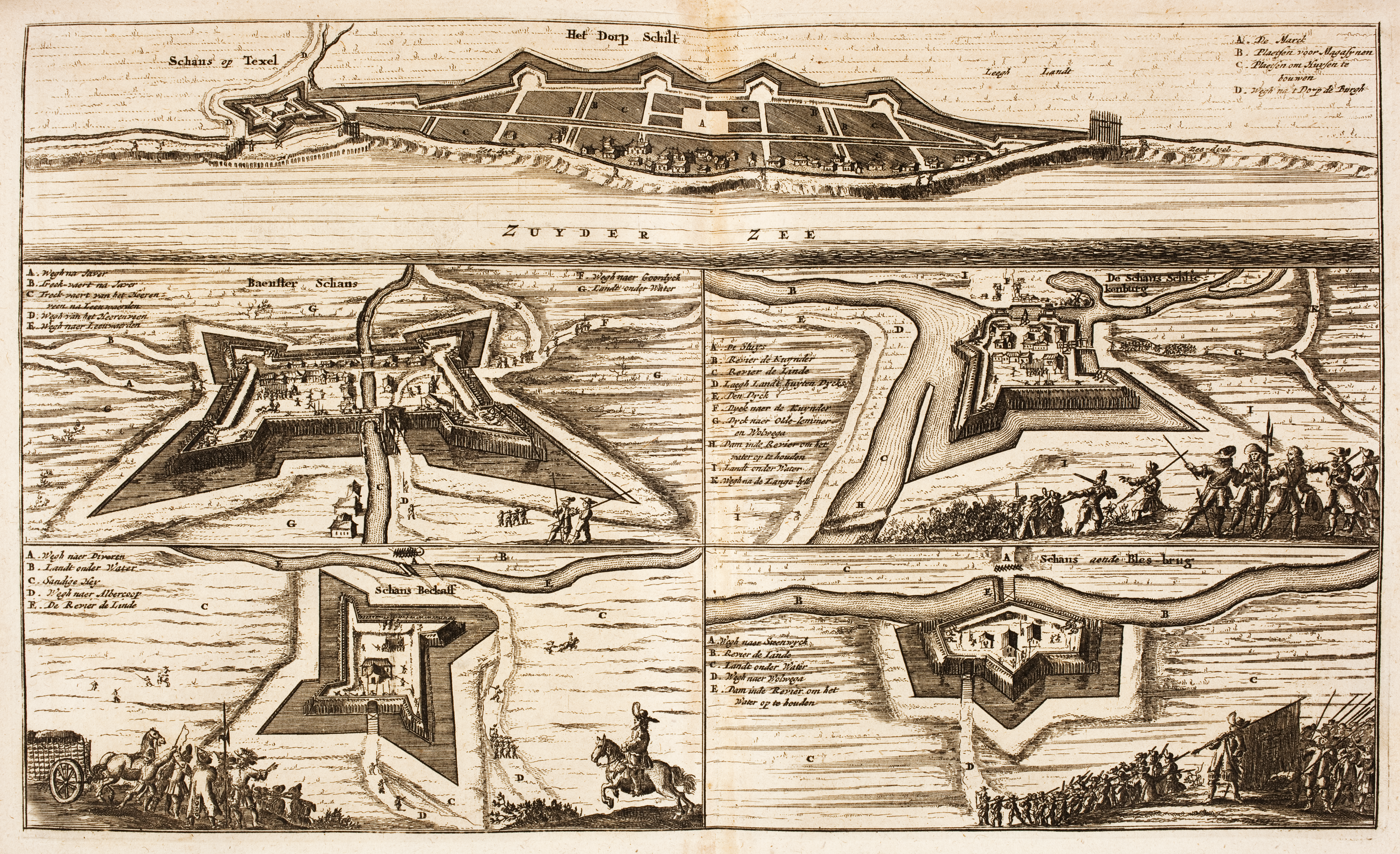
Four forts of the Frisian waterline, around 1675.

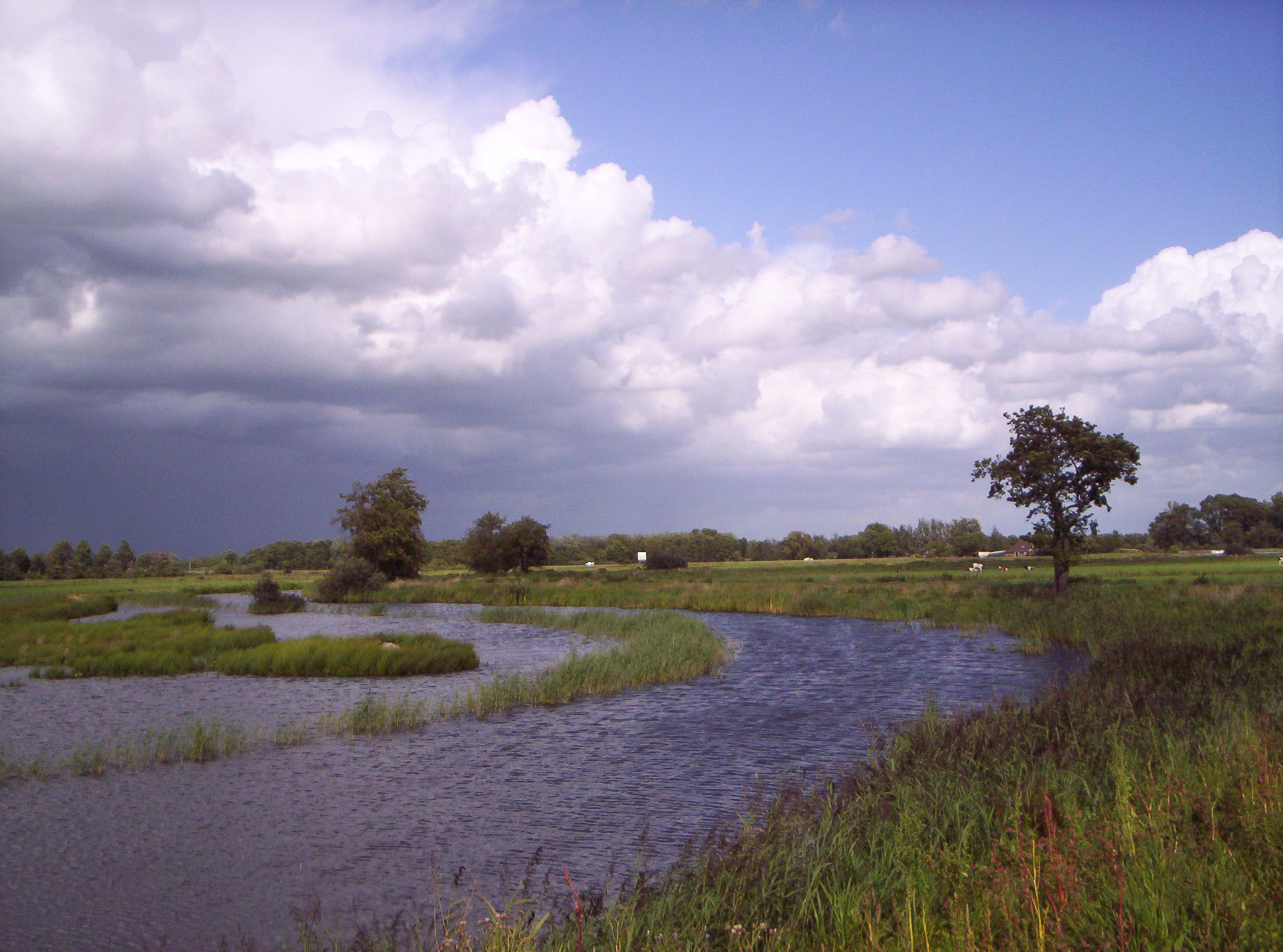
Linde valley nearby De Blesse

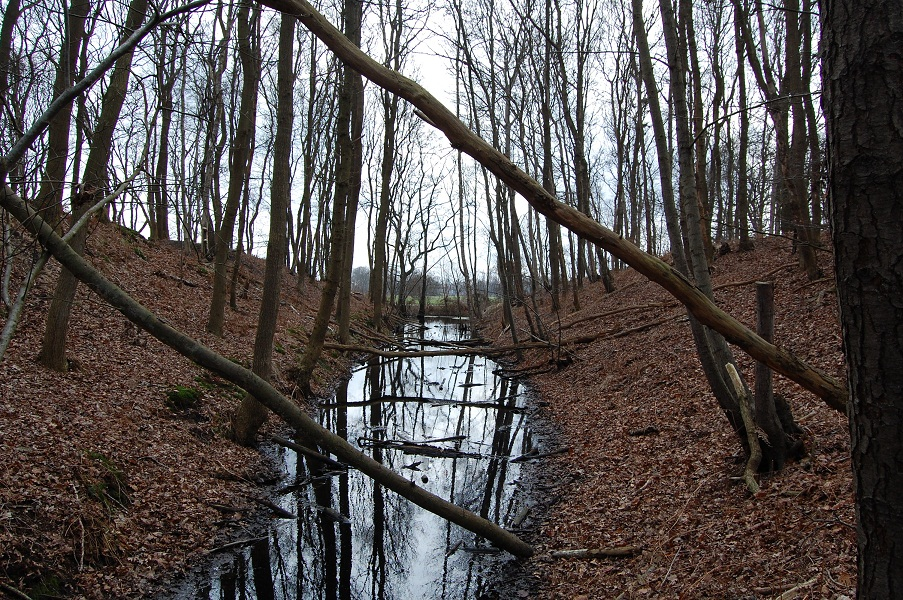
Fort of Frieschepalen

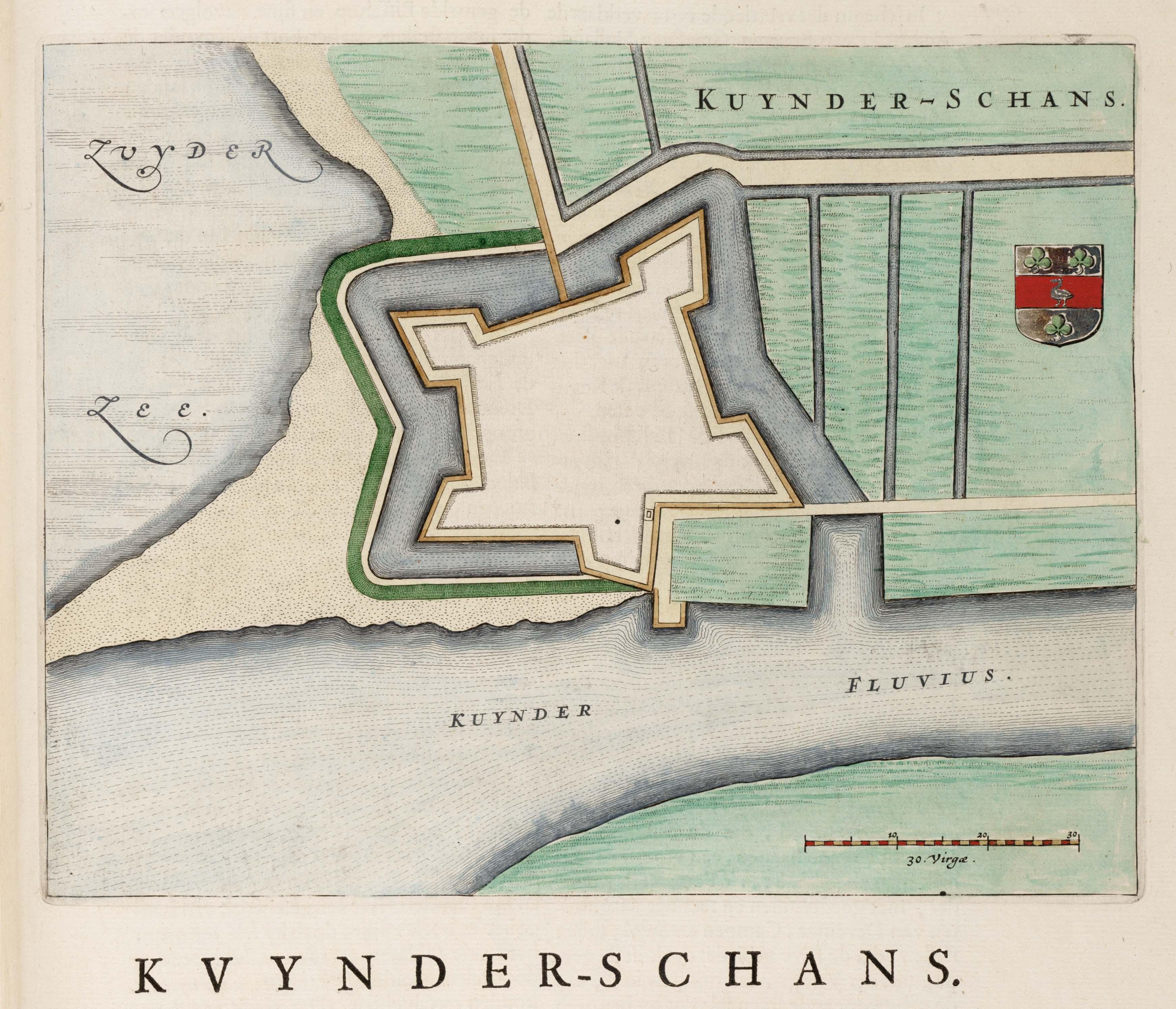
Fort Kuinre

The Frisian waterline started being built around 1580. The defence line goes from the Zuidersea, along the River Linde, to the De Blesse Bridge. Then, the defence line goes northward to Kuinre by way of Heerenveen, Terband, Gorredijk, Donkerbroek, Bakkeveen and Frieschepalen.

The area along the forts had dams flooded during the Eighty Years' War against the Spanish and in 1672 Rampjaar (Disaster Year) against Bernard von Galen and the French troops who were the bishop of Munster.

In the east, the defence line is connected to the Groninger waterlinie, which continues to Delfzijl.

Part of the defence line is also called the Tjonger-Lindelinie.

The ten schansen were in Schoterland nearby Oudehorne, just north of the River Tjonger, near Oudeschoot, along the road to Wolvega and nearby Terbant. The defence line is currently under restoration.

The defence line contains these forts:

- Sterrenschans (nearby Bakkeveen)
- Zwartendijksterschans
- Breebergschans
- Schans Frieschepalen
- Makkingaasterschans
- Bekhofschans
- Kuinderschans
- Sliekenborgschans
- Blessebergeschans
- Tolbrugschans

== See also ==
Dutch waterlines:

- Old / New Dutch Waterline
- Grebbe line
- IJssel Line
- Maas Line
- Peel-Raam Line

Other:

- Defence lines of the Netherlands
