= West Brabant waterline =

Defenses in a plan to strategically flood the Netherlands

West Brabant Waterline
- Western part of Noord Brabant
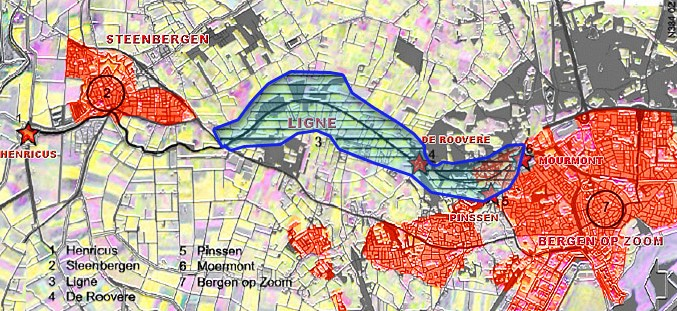

Site information
- Type: Defensive line
- Controlled by: Netherlands
- Open to the public: Yes

Site history
- Built: 1628
- In use: 1628-1830
- Battles/wars: Eighty Years' War War of the Austrian Succession Belgian Revolution

The West Brabant waterline (Dutch: West-Brabantse waterlinie) (later: Stelling West Noord-Brabant) is a Dutch military defense line based on inundation.

The West Brabant waterline is said to be the second oldest in The Netherlands (after the Eendrachtslinie) and was constructed in 1628. It is located between the fortresses of Bergen op Zoom and Steenbergen and consisted of four forts. From Bergen op Zoom, the line consists successively of the fortresses Moermont (disappeared), Pinssen and De Roovere, the inundation plain Halsterens Laag, the fortress Steenbergen and finally fort Henricus. By opening a sluice in the Steenbergse Vliet, seawater could flow from this last fort, causing the Halsters and Oudlands to flood low. The brooks Ligne and Zoom could also be used to flood the land.

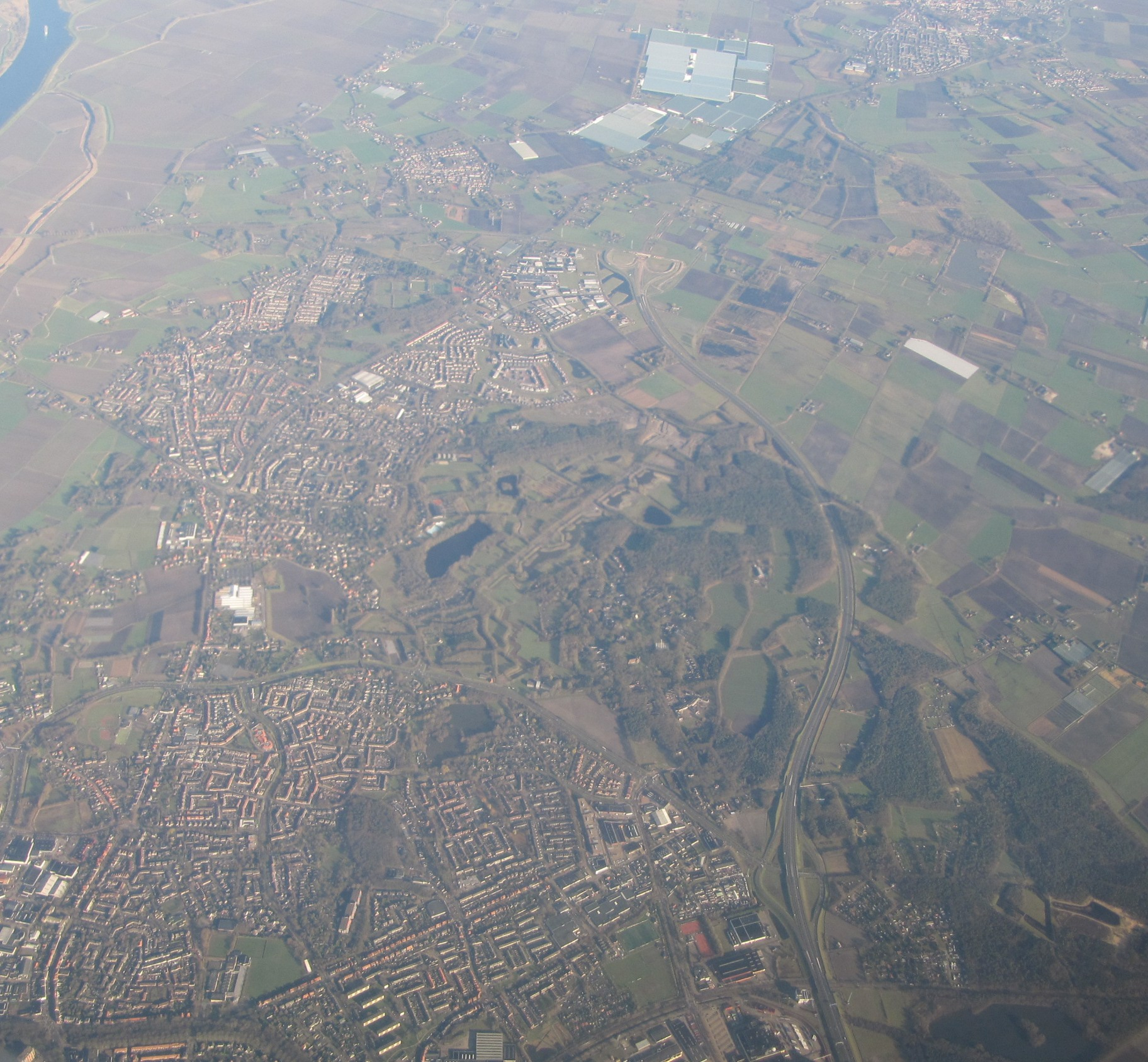
Aerial photograph

The initiative for the construction was taken by the Staten van Zeeland and Staten van Holland. The purpose of the line was to protect the mentioned cities against a Spanish attack from the east. The second goal was to secure the Eendracht, the natural waterway between these regions.

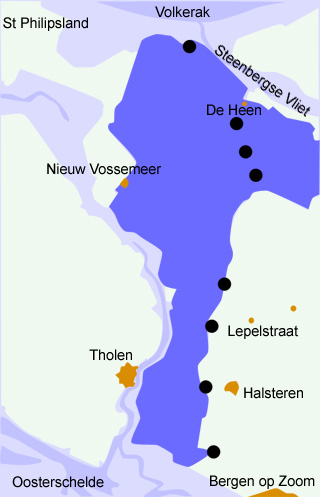
"West Brabantse waterlinie" (military defensive line) in the Netherlands. Disclaimer: The exact location of the forts and inundation areas may differ from reality to a slight extent.

Between 1628 and 1830 refuge was sought in inundation six times, once against the Spaniards, four times against the French and the last time against the Belgians.

The line was extended south of Bergen op Zoom in the World War I to be able to repel a possible attack by England. In that period the line was called the 'Stelling West Noord-Brabant' for the first time. Via Zeeland, the Anglo-French coalition would be able to reach Belgium and Germany more easily. In 1809 an invasion of Zeeland by England was repulsed by French and Dutch troops of Napoleon. On the other hand, in World War I, Germany could benefit from using the Antwerp harbour and the extra supply lines to Belgium.

In the Bergen op Zoom part of the waterline, at Fort de Roovere, in 2011 a "sunken" bridge called the Moses Bridge was opened.

It is part of the Zuiderwaterlinie (Southern water line), a line of defence that stretches from the western part to the eastern part of North Brabant.

La Vuelta 2022 will pass through the area.

== Forts along the water line ==
- Fort Henricus
- Fort de Roovere
- Fort Moermont
- Fort Pinssen

== See also ==
=== Dutch waterlines ===
- Defence Line of Amsterdam
- Frisian Water Line
- Grebbe line
- IJssel Line
- Peel-Raam Line
- Dutch Water Line

=== Other ===
- Defence lines of the Netherlands
- List of fortifications
