= PAG Casemate =

Type of Dutch fortification

PAG Casemate P11, which is now on a farm.

The PAG Casemate is a type of Dutch fortified structure. The structures date from between the world wars.

== Characteristics ==
The design for the PAG Casemate was approved in 1936 and began being built that year. PAG is an abbreviation for Pantser Afweer Geschut (Anti-tank Artillery/Gun) so the purpose is in the name. The need for a frontline position for anti-tank guns arose in the late 1930s, but the Dutch Army knew that an anti-tank gun would need a structure to keep it out of the weather and protect it from enemy fire. The bunker could be armed with a 4.7cm, 5cm or 6-veld (5.7cm) anti-tank gun and a Schwarzlose M.08/15 heavy machine gun. The walls were anywhere between 80cm and 1m thick and shored up with steel reinforcements. Thus was born the PAG Casemate. The casemate was designed to be shrapnel-proof, but couldn’t resist artillery fire. The roof and walls were only 20mm thick with some steel reinforcement. Only a few of these casemates were built. Only 2 casemates of this design were ever built.

== Deployment ==
The PAG Casemates were used in half of all Dutch defensive line, though not in mass quantities.

Grebbe Line: half of the PAG casemates were built in this line, the best preserved is the PAG casemate Rhenen.

Peel-Raam Line: The PAG casemate was located behind anti-tank ditch.

== Combat ==
Battle of Grebbe: The casemates successfully repelled German armored cars when they tried to assault the main defensive line. The bunker was later gone around and neutralized using a satchel charge.

== Post-war ==
After the war, the defensive lines of the pre-war period were obsolete, and were thus disarmed and decommissioned. The 4.7cm anti-tank guns were obsolete and were removed from the bunkers. The only 2 bunkers ever built have been located, but are either buried or abandoned. The 2 casemates are P11 and P12. P11 is located on private property near Rhenen, and is used as a shed. P12 is buried entirely underground west of the town of Grebbeberg.
