= Adrianus Antonius van Nijnatten =

Dutch military officer

General Adrianus Antonius van Nijnatten
- Born: 9 February 1880; Breda, Netherlands
- Died: 15 August 1948 (aged 68); Breda, Netherlands
- Spouse: Sofia Louisa Kats
- Children: 4
- Military career
- Allegiance: Netherlands
- Branch: Dutch Army; Royal Netherlands East Indies Army
- Service years: 1898–1946
- Rank: Lieutenant general
- Commands: 13th Infantry Regiment; 3rd Army Corps; Royal Netherlands East Indies Army
- Conflicts: World War II; Battle of the Netherlands; Battle of Mill

Adrianus Antonius van Nijnatten (9 February 1880 – 15 August 1948) was a Dutch military officer who served in World War II.

== Biography ==
Adrianus Antonius van Nijnatten was born on 9 February 1880 in Breda to Gerardus van Nijnatten and Cornelia Koremans. In 1899 he entered the Royal Military Academy in Breda as a cadet. He was sworn in around 1904 as a 2nd lieutenant and was stationed in Doesburg. On 30 October 1905 he married Sofia Louisa Kats in Breda. He had four daughters with her. From 1909 to 1914 he served as a 2nd lieutenant in the Royal Netherlands East Indies Army on Celebes. From 1914 to 1921 he was a captain in Breda and then in Maastricht, where he later became a major. Afterwards he was stationed in Venlo as an instructor of the Civil Guard Limburg. Until 1935 he was commander of the 13th Infantry Regiment in Maastricht with the rank of lieutenant colonel.

From 1935 to 1938 he was a colonel and commandant of the forces in Amersfoort. On 1 May 1938 he was promoted to major general and made commander of the Third Army Corps. During the Dutch mobilization following the outbreak of World War II, he operated out of the headquarters in Vught. During the German invasion of the Netherlands in May 1940 he commanded the Third Army Corps in the south and oversaw their retreat behind the water lines. In July 1940 he was demobilized. In May 1942 he went with all the Dutch officers into captivity, first being incarcerated in a hospital in Aachen, then in Nuremberg, Germany. After a few months he was released because he was over 60 years of age. Following an Axis search for him during the beginning of the liberation in June 1944, he went into hiding in Den Bosch. After the liberation of Breda in October 1944 he went to Eindhoven. He was promoted to lieutenant general and began organizing a new Royal Netherlands East Indies Army. He kept a diary throughout the war. In February 1946 he suffered a stroke in Eindhoven, retiring two months later. He died in Breda on 15 August 1948. His wife died a year later.

== Military decorations ==
- Knight of the Order of the Netherlands Lion (23 August 1939)
- Knight of the Order of Orange-Nassau (4 June 1926)
- Officers' Cross (6 December 1917)
- Pro Ecclesia et Pontifice (9 March 1931)
- Grand Officer of the Order of the Crown (27 April 1939)
