= Defence lines of the Netherlands =

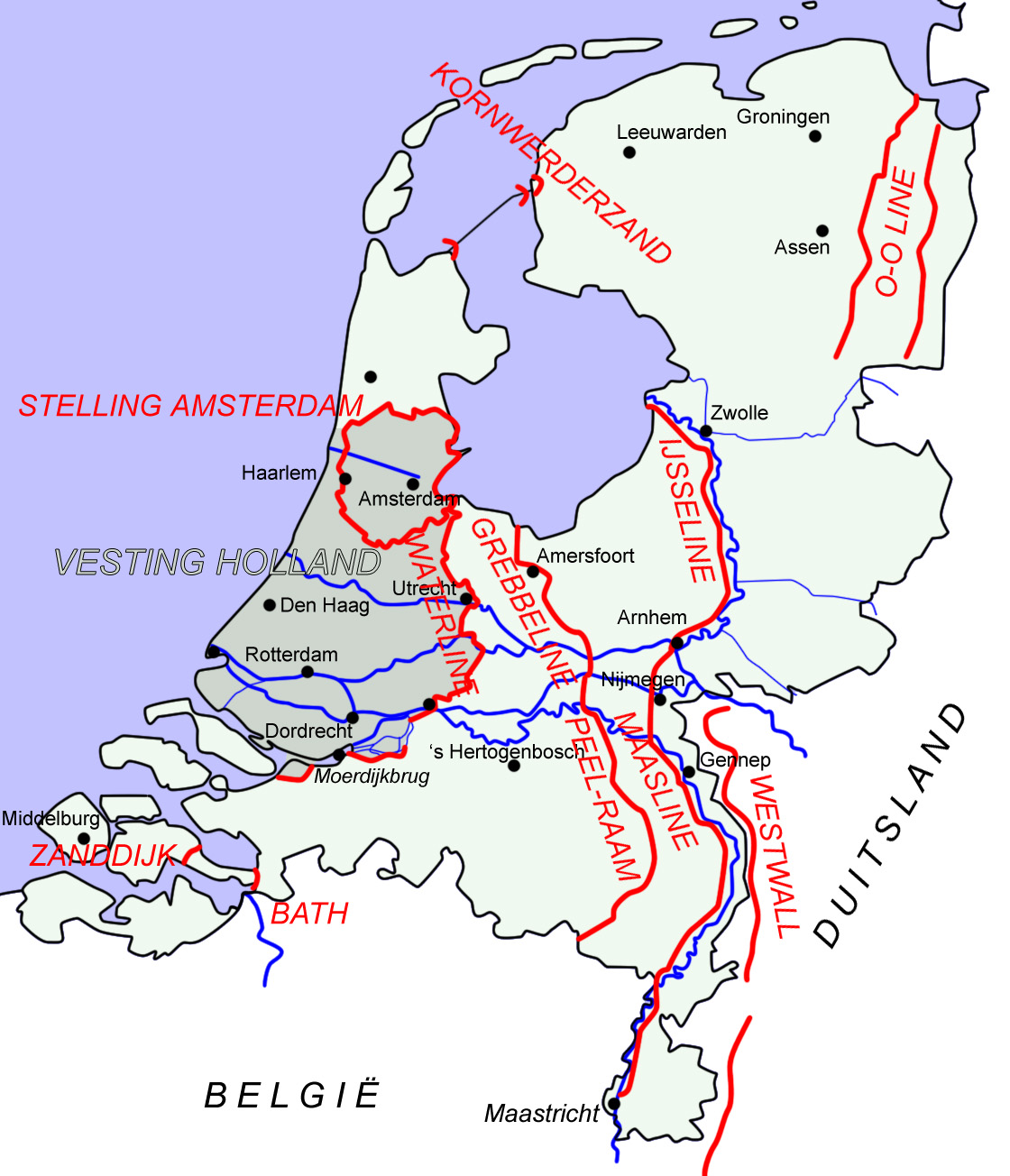
Overview of the Dutch defense lines in 1940

== Roman defense line ==
- Upper German Limes Limes Germanicus

== Pre-1874 defense lines ==
- Circumvallatielinie van Groenlo
- Frisian Water Line (Friese Waterlinie)
- Groningse Waterlinie
- Helperlinie
- West Brabant waterline
- Linie van Beverwijk
- Linie van de Eems
- Linie van de Eendracht
- Linie van Noord-Holland
- Oostfrontier
- Hollandic Water Line (Oude Hollandse Waterlinie)
- Positie van 's-Hertogenbosch
- Posten van Krayenhoff
- Staats - Spaanse Linies
- Stelling Den Helder
- Stelling West Noord-Brabant
- Zijper Stelling
- Zuider Frontier

== Fortification law 1874 ==
The Vestingwet (eng: Fortification Law) or Wet tot regeling en voltooiing van het vestingstelsel (eng: Law to regulate and complete the fortification) was signed on 18 April 1874. The law dealt with the defense of the Netherlands against enemy attacks.

The main principle was defense by flooding where as the army of the Netherlands would withdraw to the area around Amsterdam. After the Franco-Prussian War (1870–1871) it became clear that a new defense plan was needed. The law was made by the Minister of War August Weitzel under King Willem III. The Law became dysfunctional at 28 March 1938.

- Grebbe Line (Grebbelinie)
- IJssel Line (IJssellinie)
- New Hollandic Line (Nieuwe Hollandse Waterlinie)
- Defence Line of Amsterdam (Stelling van Amsterdam)
- Stelling van het Hollandsch Diep en het Volkerak
- Stelling van de monden der Maas en van het Haringvliet
- Werken aan de Westerschelde
- Zuiderwaterlinie (Which includes the West Brabant waterline)

== Interbellum (1918–1940) ==
- Bath & Zanddijk Stellingen
- Geullinie
- Grebbe Line (Grebbelinie)
- IJssel Line (IJssellinie)
- Kazematten Afsluitdijk
- Maaslinie
- Linge - Waallinie
- Oranjestelling
- Peel-Raam Line (Peel-Raamstelling)
- Waal-Maaslinie
- Weerstandslinies Noord-Oost Nederland

== World War II (1939–1945) ==
During the occupation of the Netherlands, the Germans made fortifications to stop the Allies from liberating the Netherlands and to protect their V2 rocket platforms in the Netherlands. The Germans built new defense lines like the Atlantic Wall but also reused the Dutch defense line like the Grebbe line.

- Assenerstellung / Frieslandriegel
- Atlantic Wall (Atlantikwall)
- Brabantstellung
- Vordere Wasserstellung
- Hintere Wasserstellung
- Panther Line (Pantherstellung)
- IJsselstellung

== Cold War (1946–1991) ==
During the Cold War a defence line was created to slow down a potential Soviet attack on the Netherlands.

- IJssel Line (IJssellinie) (1953–1964)

== Maps of the defense lines ==
Stelling van Amsterdam
Defense line of Amsterdam

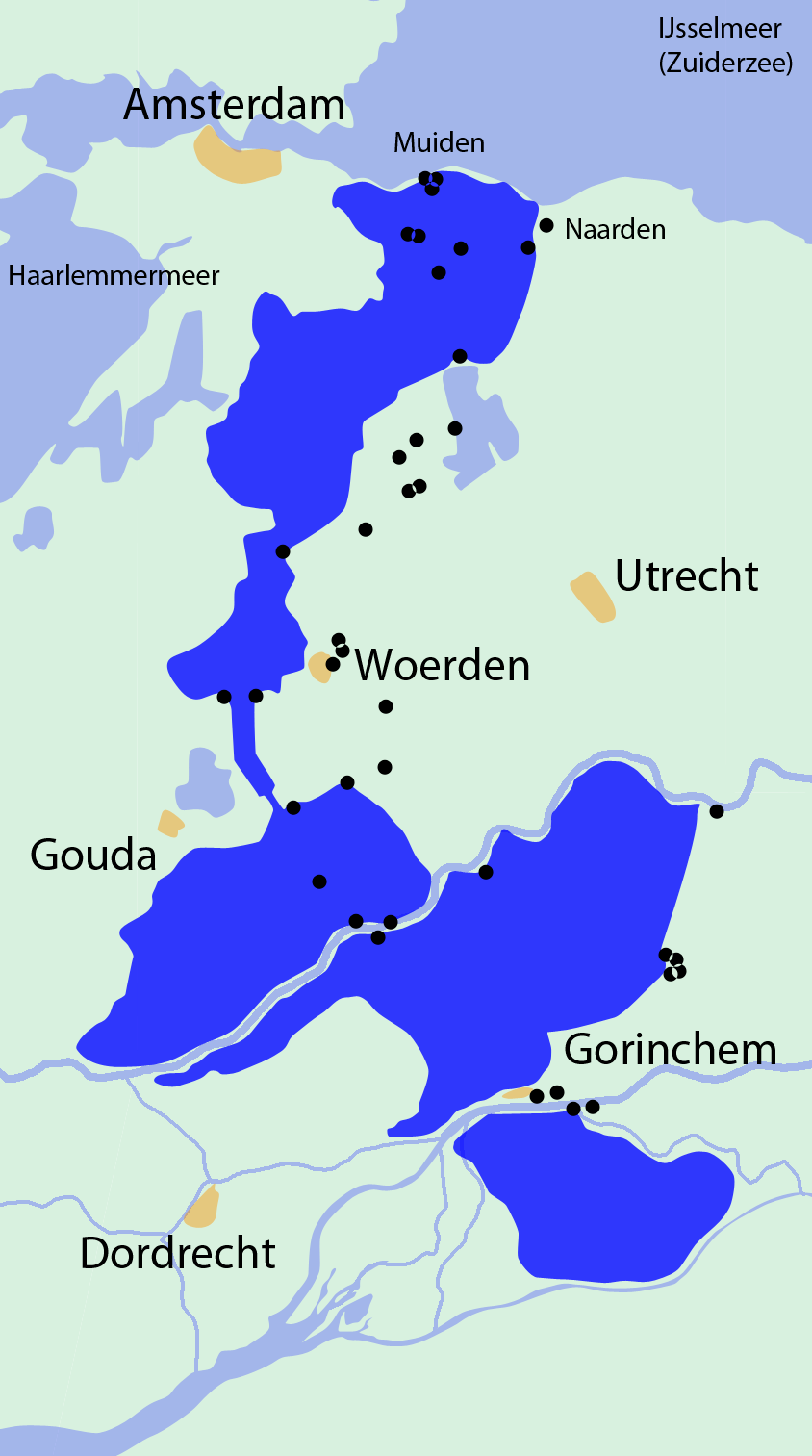
Oude Nederlandse waterlinie
Hollandic Water Line

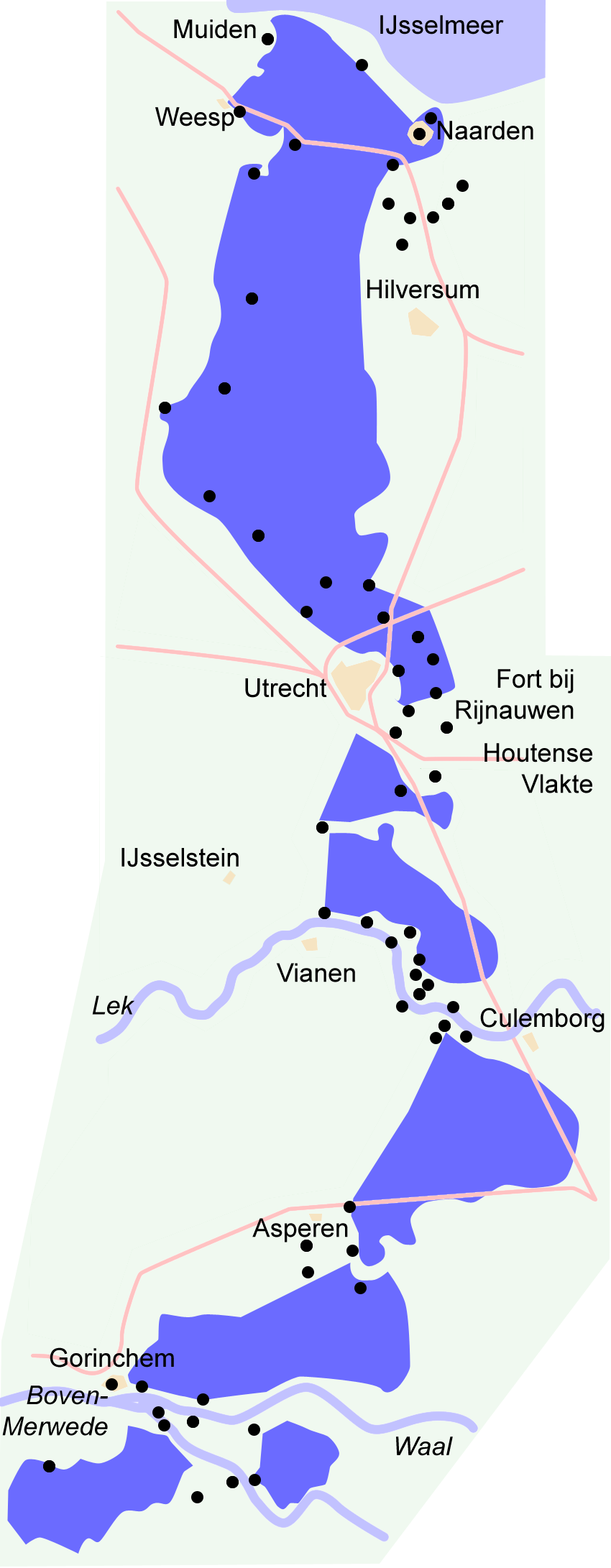
Nieuwe Nederlandse waterlinie
New Hollandic Water Line

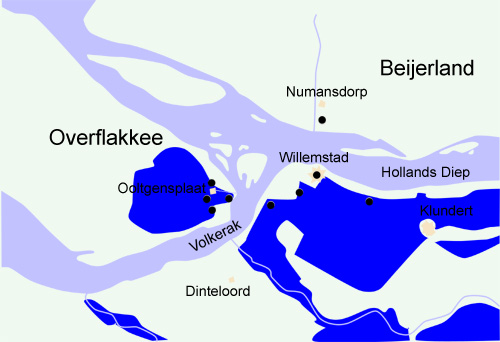
Stelling van het Hollands Diep en Volkerak
Defense line of Hollands Diep en Volkerak

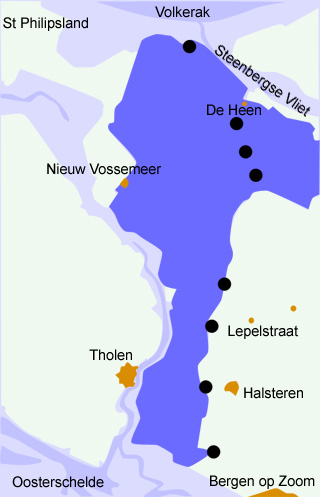
West Brabantse waterlinie
West Brabentse Water line

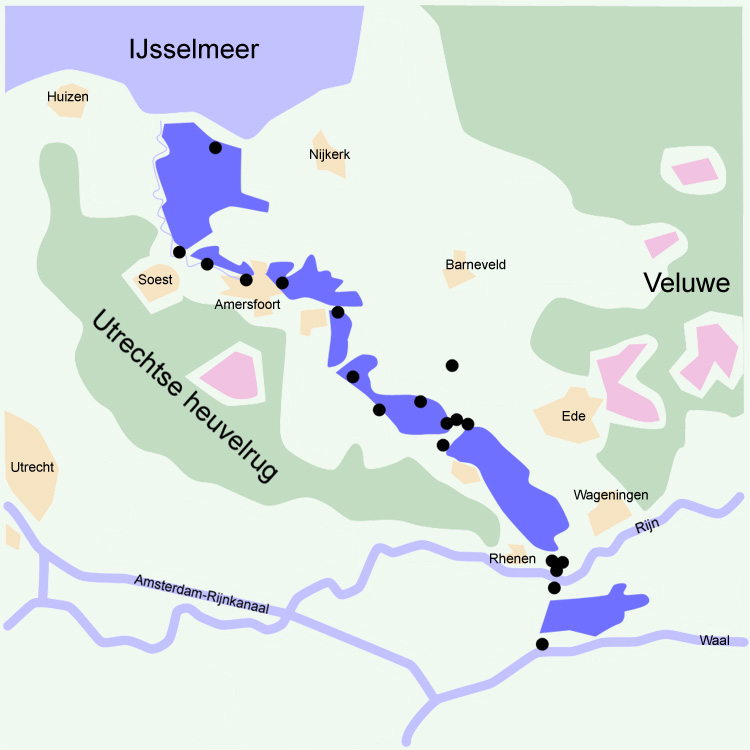
Grebbelinie
Grebbe line

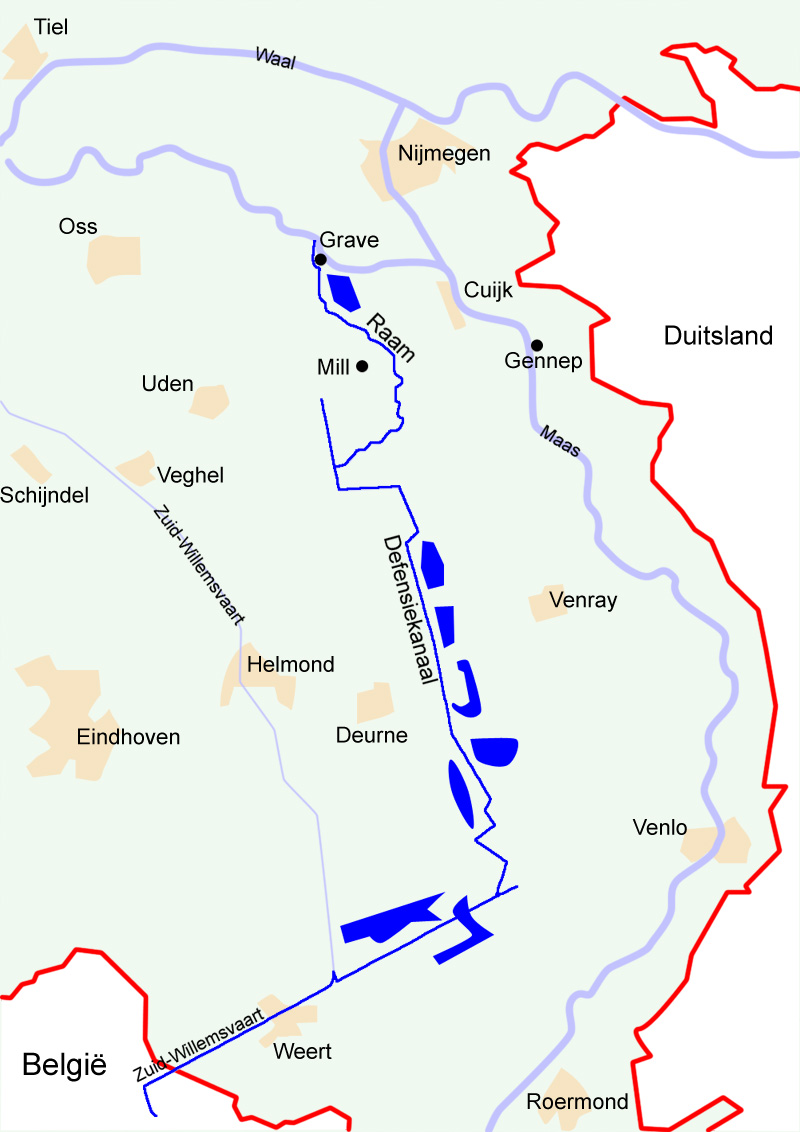
Peel-Raamstelling
Peel-Raam line

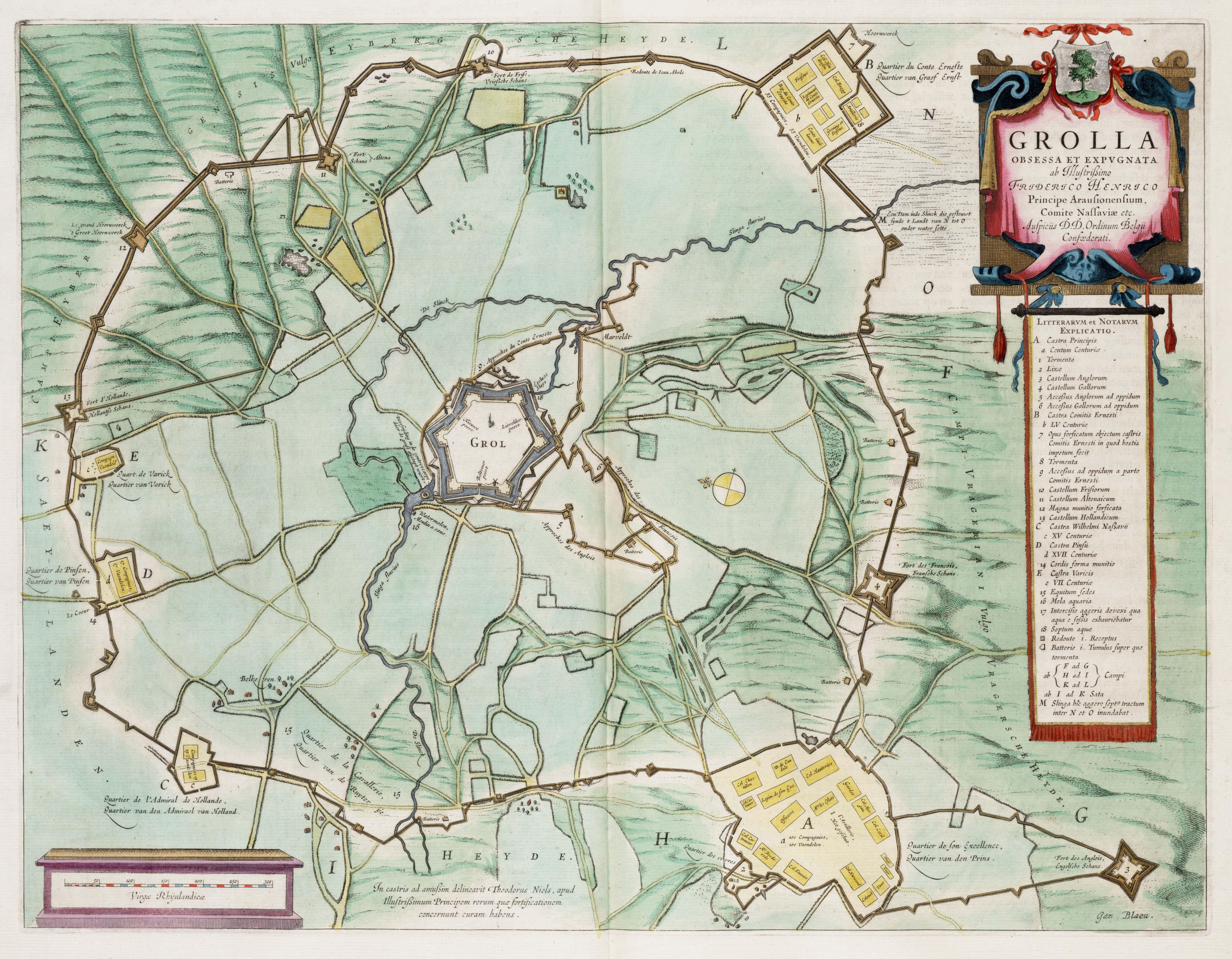
Circumvallatielinie van Groenlo
Circumvallation of Groenlo

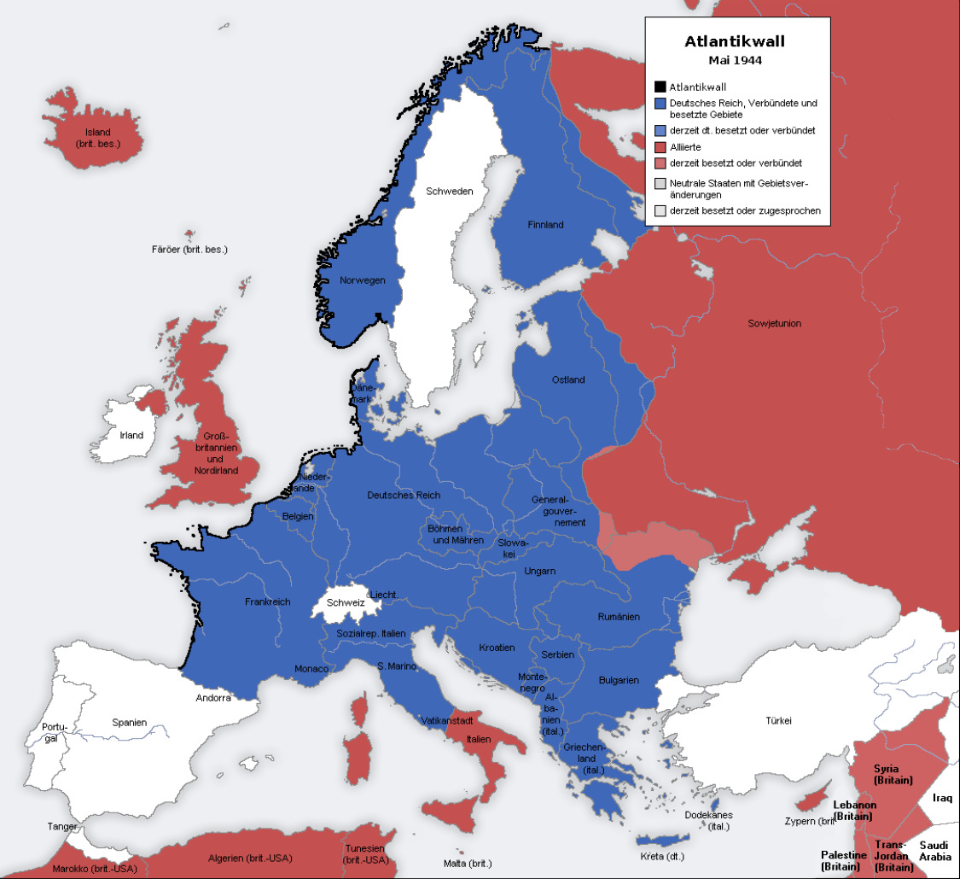
Atlantikwall
Atlantic Wall
