= Nieuweschoot =

Nieuweschoot Nijskoat
- Village
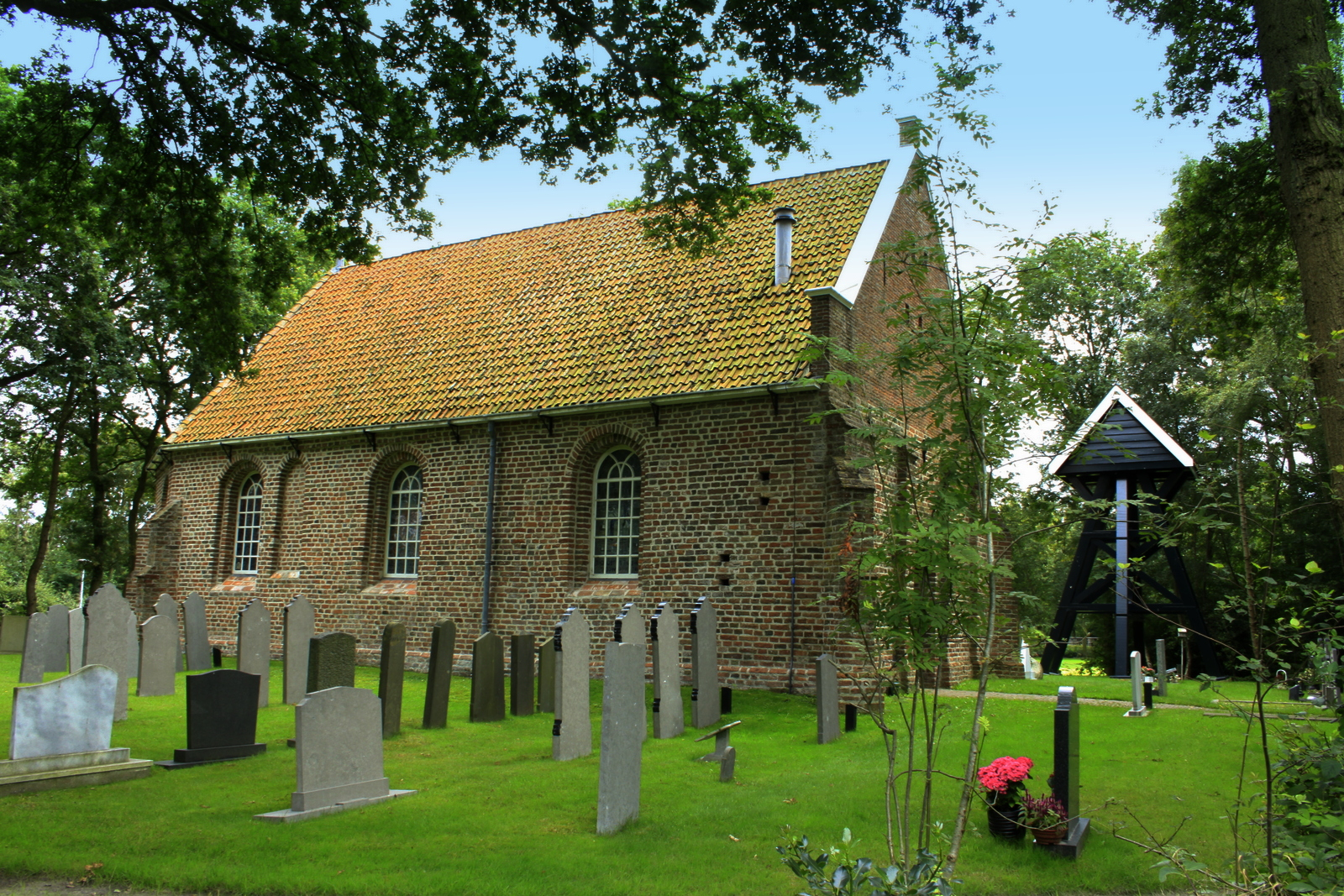
- Nieuweschoot church

- Flag Coat of arms

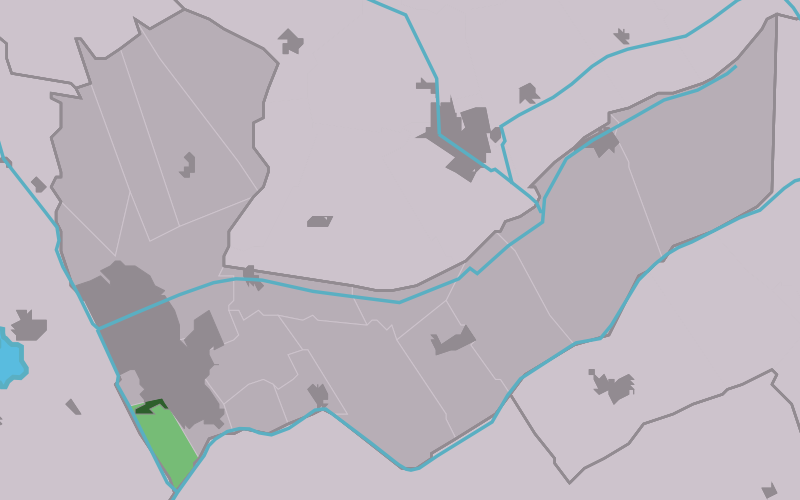
- Location in the Heerenveen municipality

- Location in the Netherlands Nieuweschoot (Netherlands)
- Country: Netherlands
- Province: Friesland
- Municipality: Heerenveen

Area
  - Total: 3.47 km^{2} (1.34 sq mi)
- Elevation: 0.5 m (1.6 ft)

Population (2021)
  - Total: 185
  - Density: 53.3/km^{2} (138/sq mi)
- Time zone: UTC+1 (CET)
  - Summer (DST): UTC+2 (CEST)
- Postal code: 8445
- Dialing code: 0513

Nieuweschoot (West Frisian: Nijskoat) is a village in Heerenveen in the province of Friesland, the Netherlands. It had a population of around 185 in January 2017.

== History ==
The village was first mentioned in 1408 as Nye Schoten, and means corner of higher ground. Nieuw (new) has been added to distinguish between Oudeschoot. The Dutch Reformed church of the village date from the 14th century. In 1840, Nieuweschoot was home to 164 people.

Before 1934, Nieuweschoot was part of the Schoterland municipality.

== Gallery ==
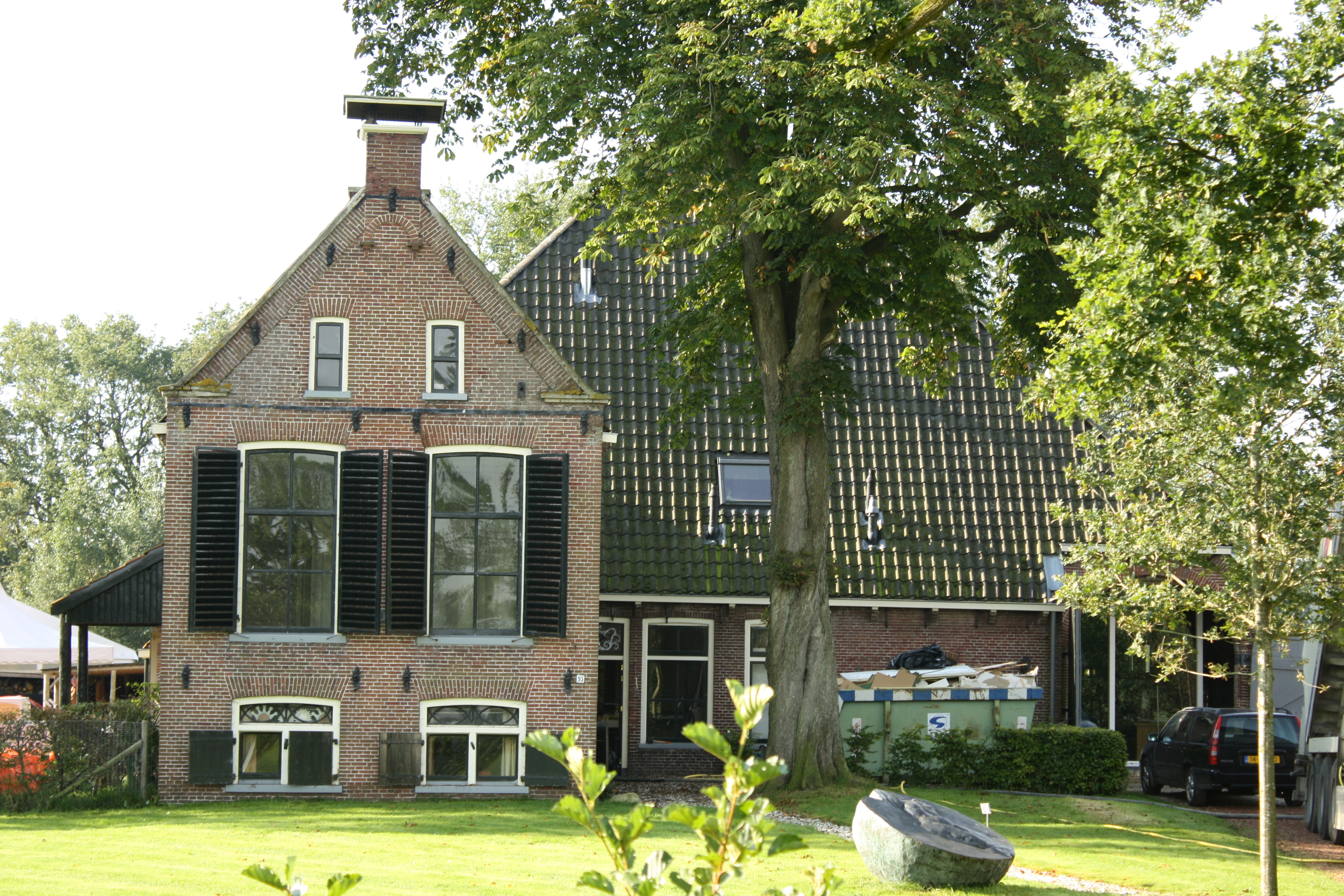
Farm Rika Zathe

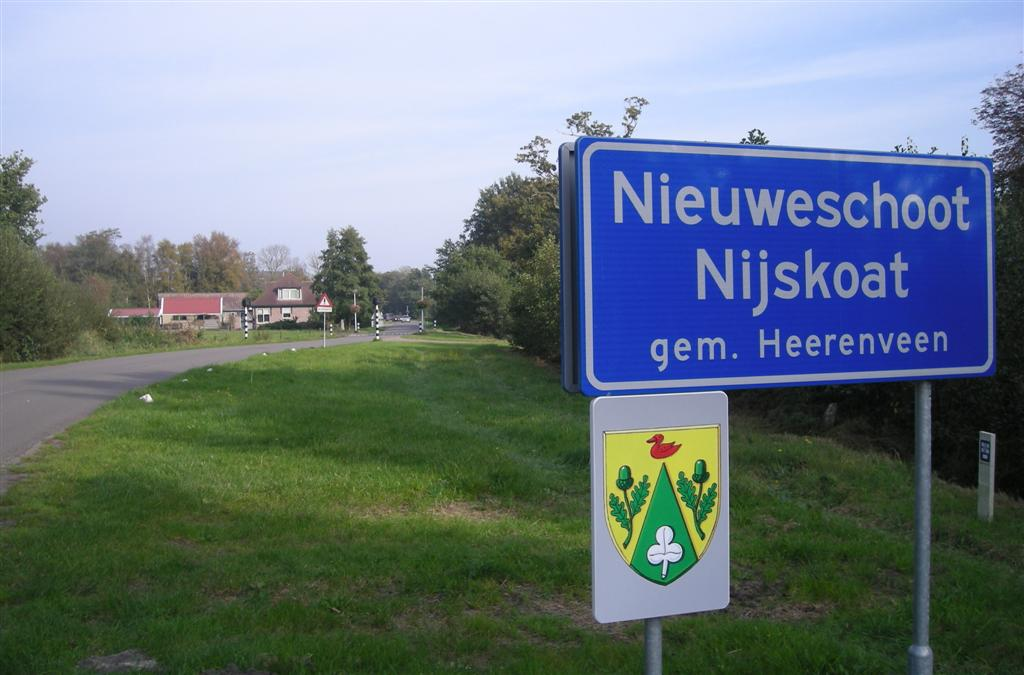
View on Nieuweschoot
