= Frieschepalen =

Frieschepalen Fryske Peallen
- Village
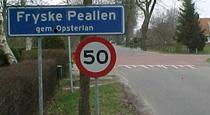

- Flag Coat of arms

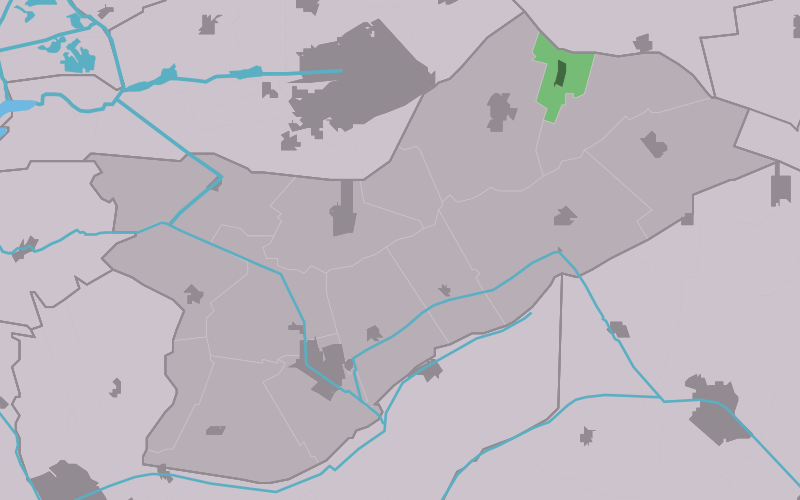
- Location in Opsterland municipality

- Location in the Netherlands Frieschepalen (Netherlands)
- Country: Netherlands
- Province: Friesland
- Municipality: Opsterland

Area
  - Total: 4.42 km^{2} (1.71 sq mi)
- Elevation: 5 m (16 ft)

Population (2021)
  - Total: 1,015
  - Density: 230/km^{2} (595/sq mi)
- Time zone: UTC+1 (CET)
  - Summer (DST): UTC+2 (CEST)
- Postal code: 9249
- Dialing code: 0512

Frieschepalen (West Frisian: Fryske Peallen) is a village in the municipality of Opsterland in the east of Friesland, the Netherlands. It had a population of around 1,015 in January 2017.

== History ==
The village was first mentioned in 1622 as Vriesche Palen, and means "Frisian border poles" which refers to the border with the province of Groningen. A sconce was built in 1593 on the border to guard against the Spanish. The sconce was conquered in 1672 by Christoph Bernhard von Galen, the Prince-Bishop of Münster.

In 1650, the Drachtster Compagnonsvaart was dug and Frieschepalen developed into a peat colony. In 1927, a Reformed Church was built in the village.

== Gallery ==
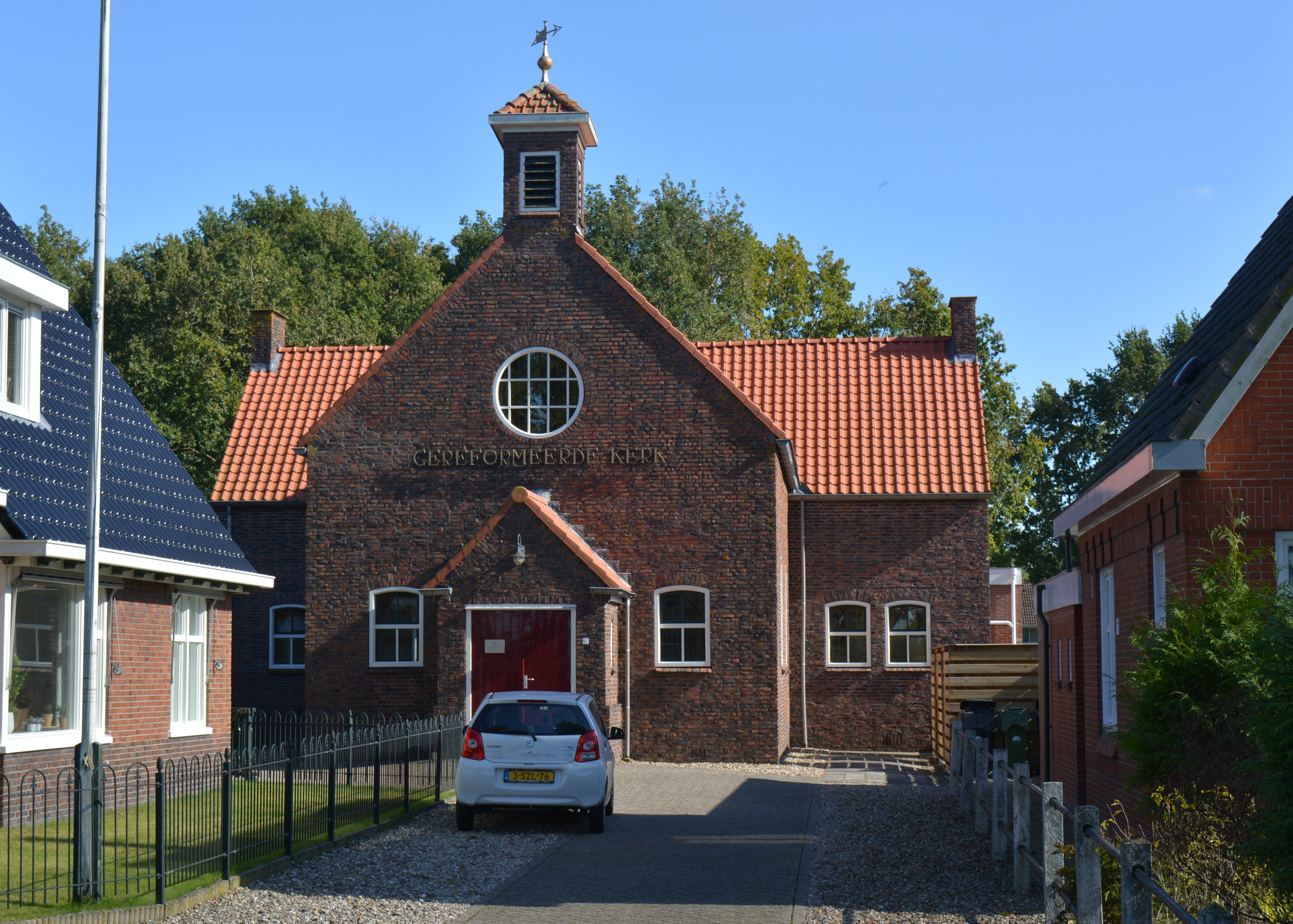
Reformed Church

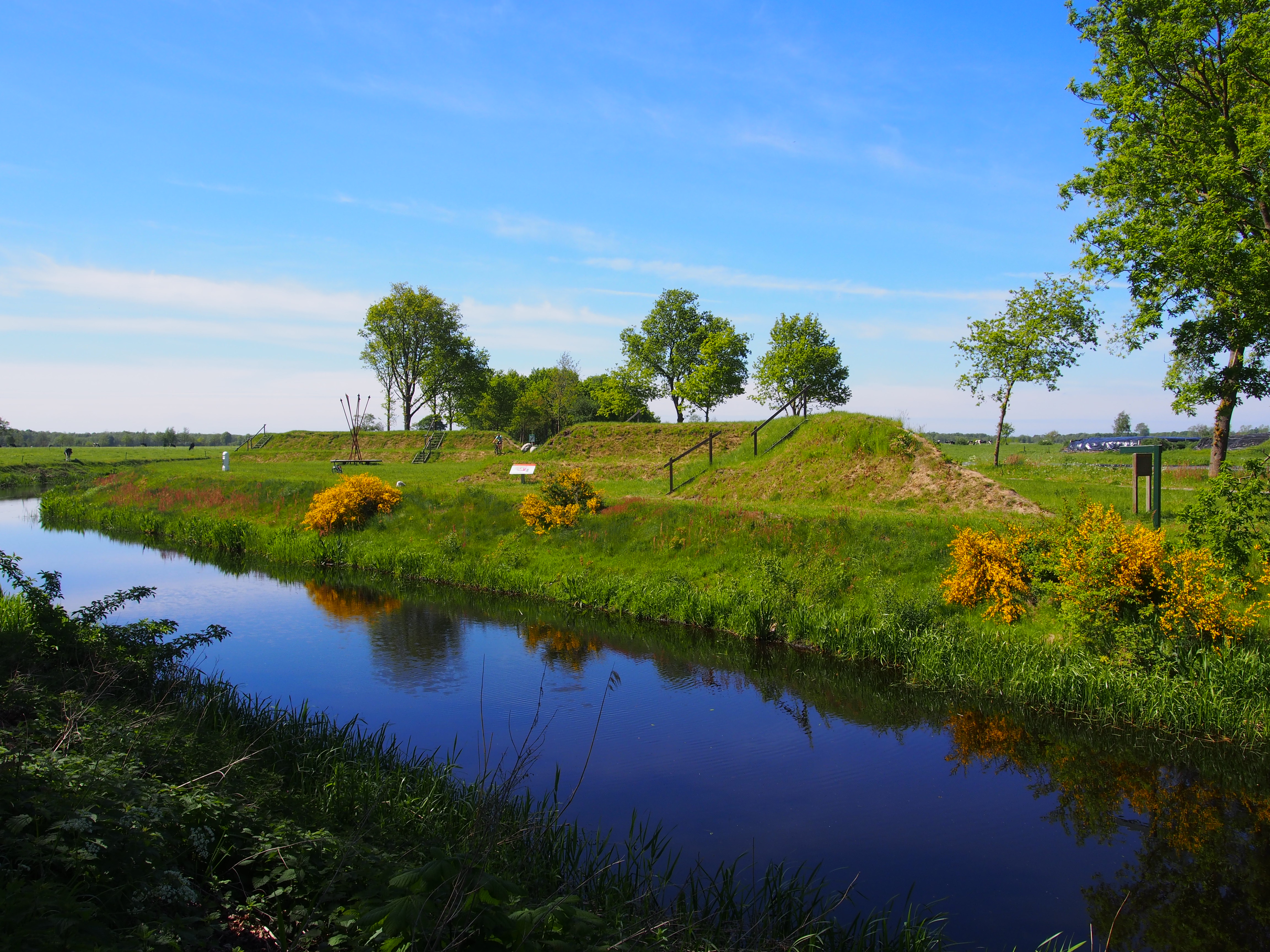
The sconce
