= Oudeschoot =

Oudeschoot Aldskoat
- Village
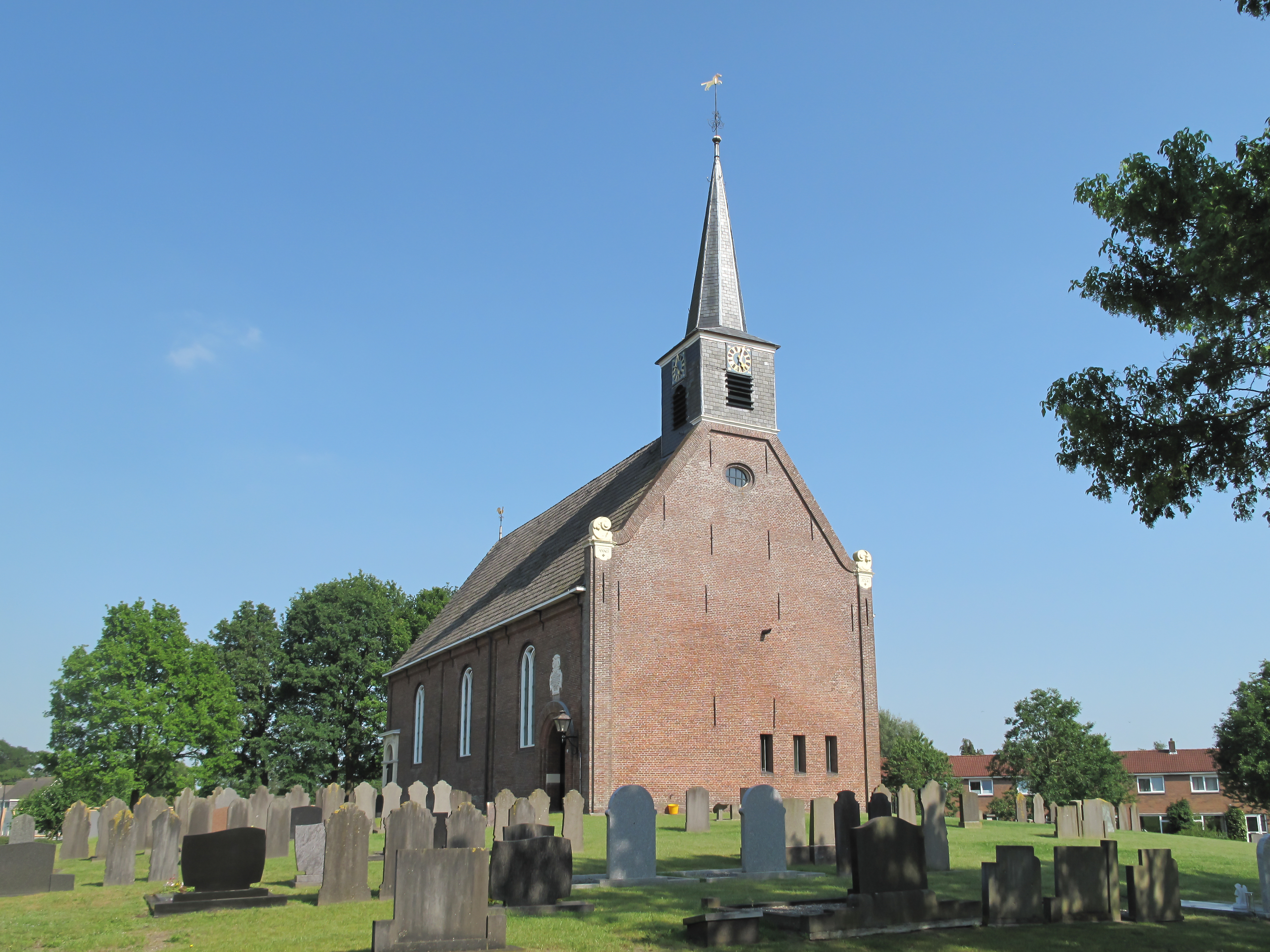
- Oudeschoot, chapel: Skoattertsjerke

- Flag Coat of arms

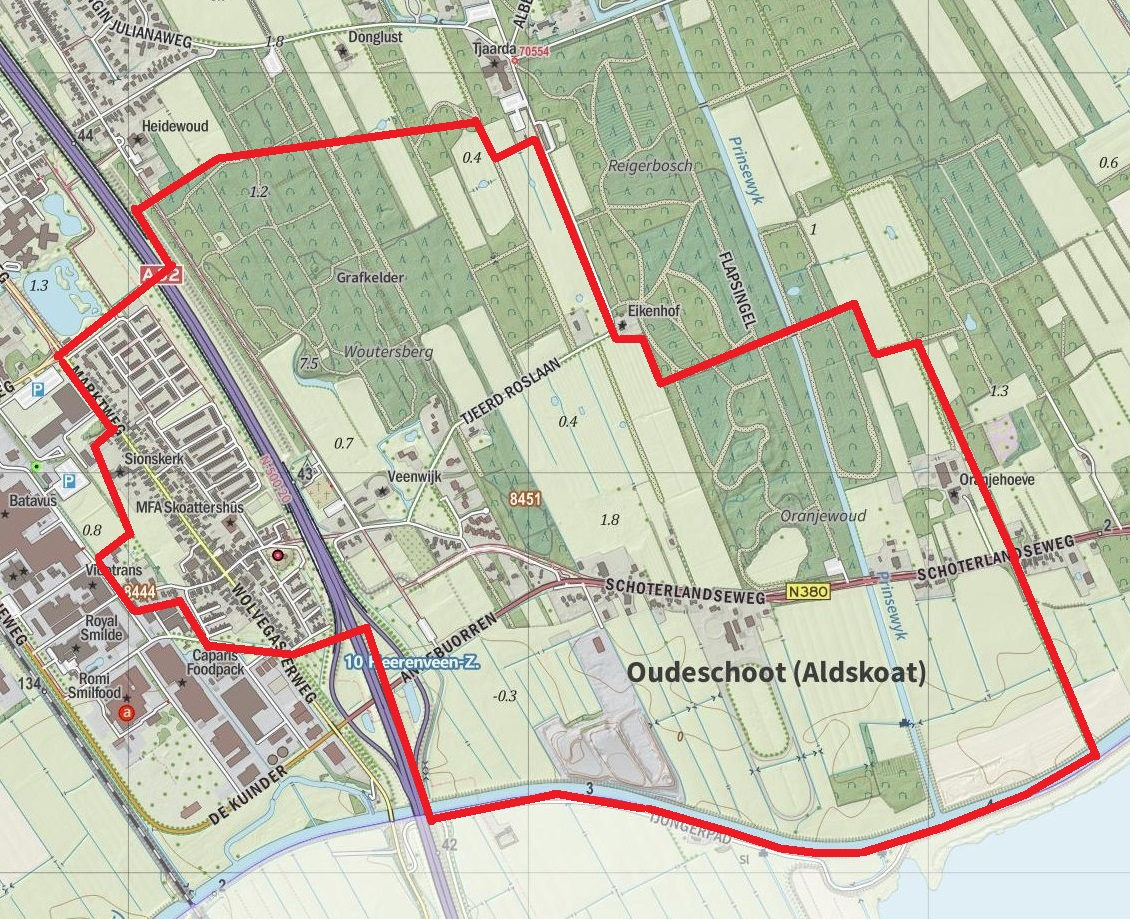
- Map of Oudeschoot

- Location in the Netherlands Oudeschoot (Netherlands)
- Country: Netherlands
- Province: Friesland
- Municipality: Heerenveen

Area
  - Total: 3.72 km^{2} (1.44 sq mi)
- Elevation: 2 m (6.6 ft)

Population (2021)
  - Total: 1,500
  - Density: 400/km^{2} (1,000/sq mi)
- Time zone: UTC+1 (CET)
  - Summer (DST): UTC+2 (CEST)
- Postal code: 8451
- Dialing code: 0513

Oudeschoot (West Frisian: Aldskoat) is a village in Heerenveen in the province of Friesland, the Netherlands. It had a population of around 1,580 in January 2017.

== History ==
The village was first mentioned in 1299 as van Scoeten. The name means "corner of higher land". Oude (old) has been added to distinguish between Nieuweschoot. In 1299, a nunnery of the German order was founded in Oudeschoot, and has existed until 1580. Oudeschoot used to be the capital of the grietenij (predecessor of a municipality) Schoterland until 1934. In 1828, the main road from Leeuwarden to Zwolle was built through the village, and was later joined by a railway line. Since 1600, the Skoattermerk, an annual market is held on the second day of Pentecost, and is the oldest extant market in the northern provinces.

The Dutch Reformed church was built in 1752. In 1840, it was home to 452 people. Julia Jan Woutersstichting is a retirement home which was built in 1901 on the grounds of the 1763 manor house Veenwijk. The home is built in Renaissance Revival style and is surrounded by a large park.

Before 1934, Oudeschoot was part of the Schoterland municipality. In 1965, a large part of the village was annexed by Heerenveen.

== Gallery ==
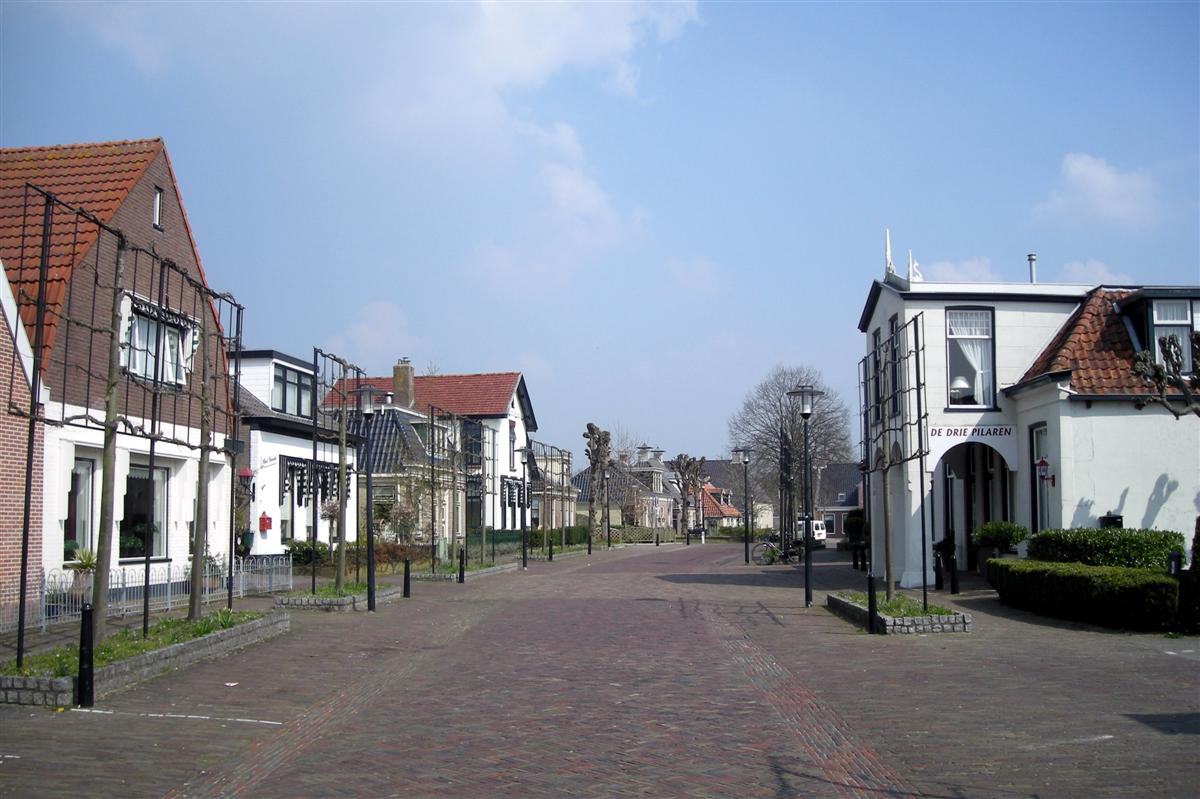
Street view

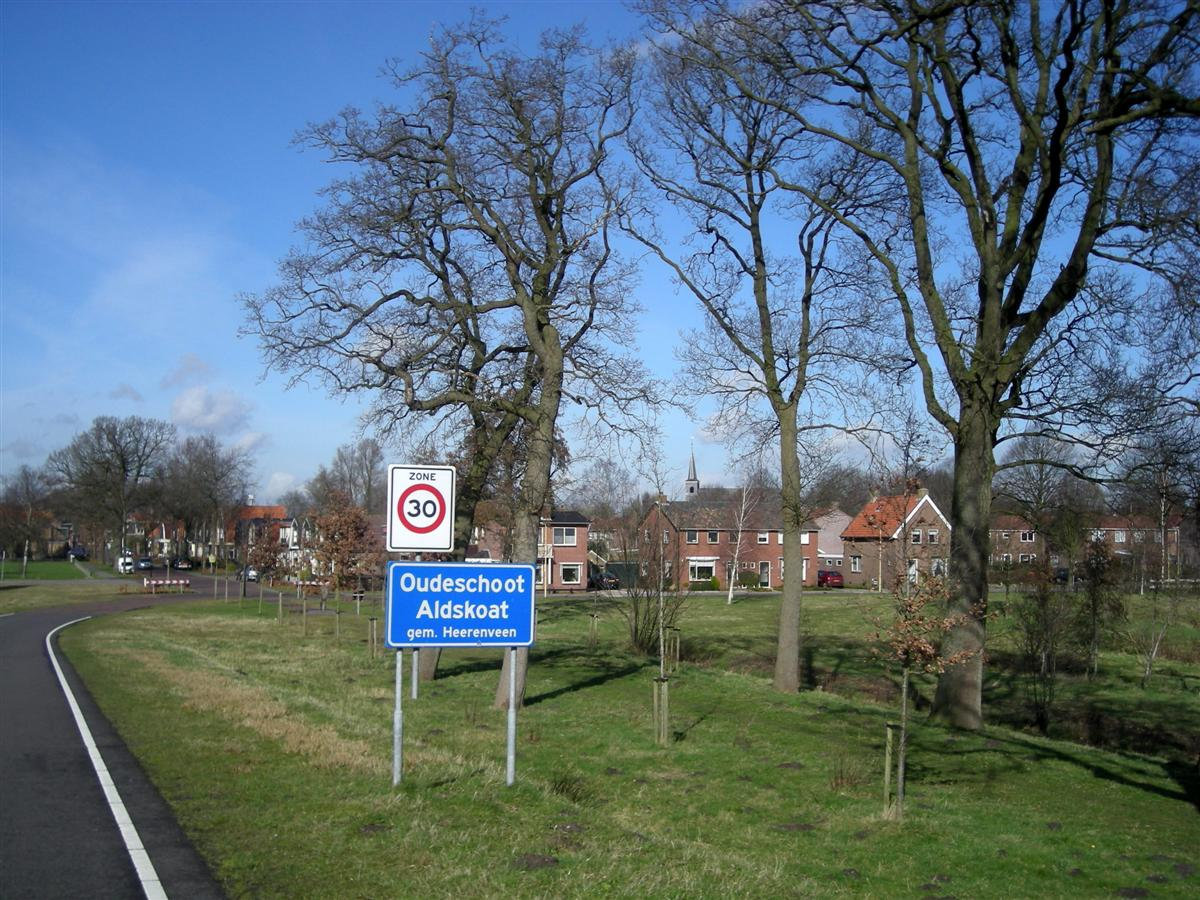
Welcome to Oudeschoot

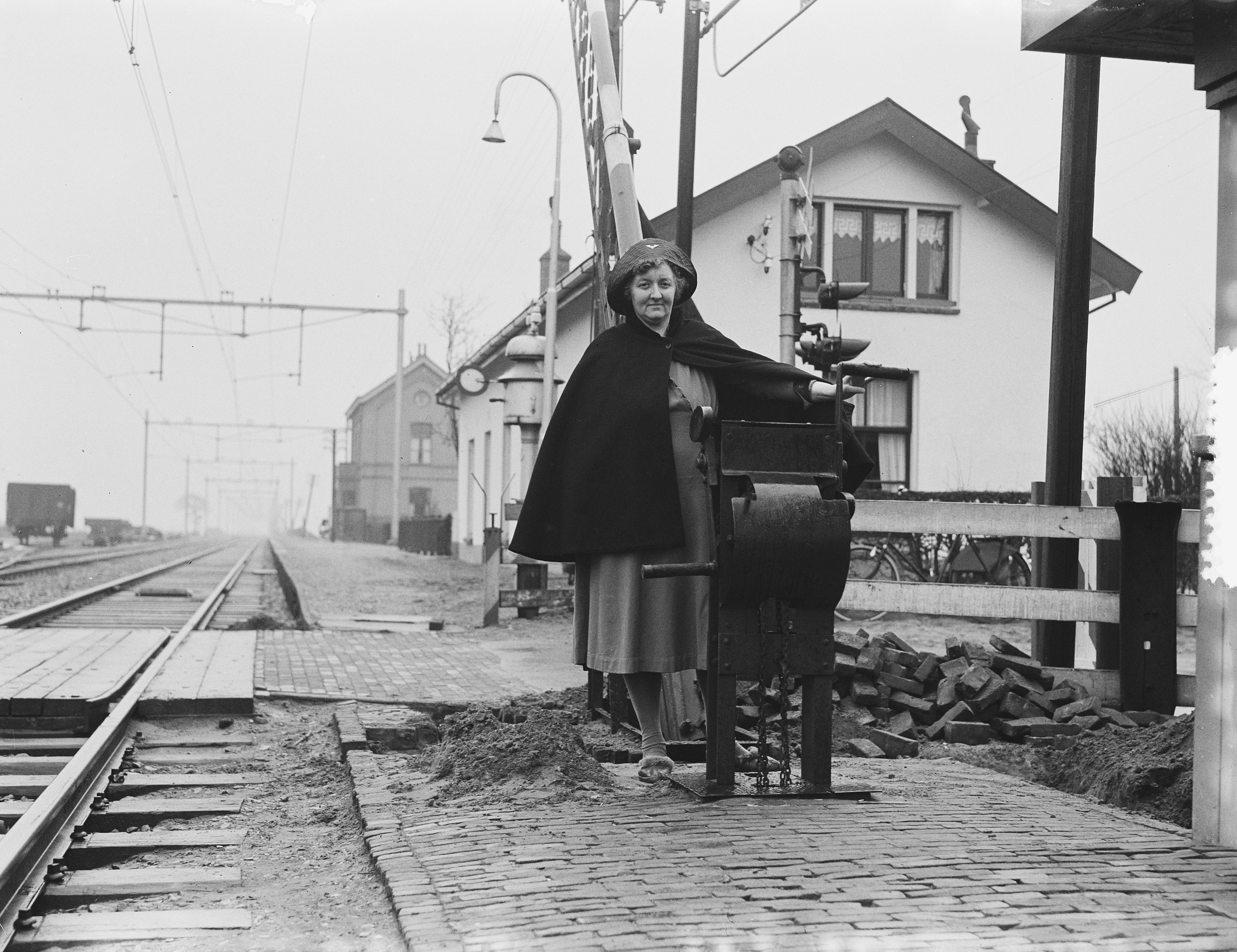
Former railway station (1952)
