= Grebbe Line =

Forward defence line of the Waterline

Coordinates: 52°04′43″N 5°27′50″E

- Grebbelinie
- Netherlands
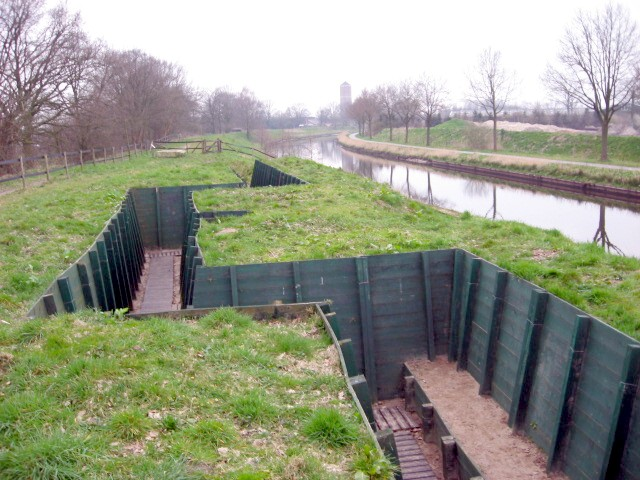
- Grebbe line near Scherpenzeel

Site information
- Type: Defensive line
- Controlled by: Netherlands

Site history
- Built: 1745–1940
- In use: 1745–1951
- Materials: Flooded plains, sluices, earth walls, brick, concrete, steel
- Battles/wars: Battle of the Grebbeberg

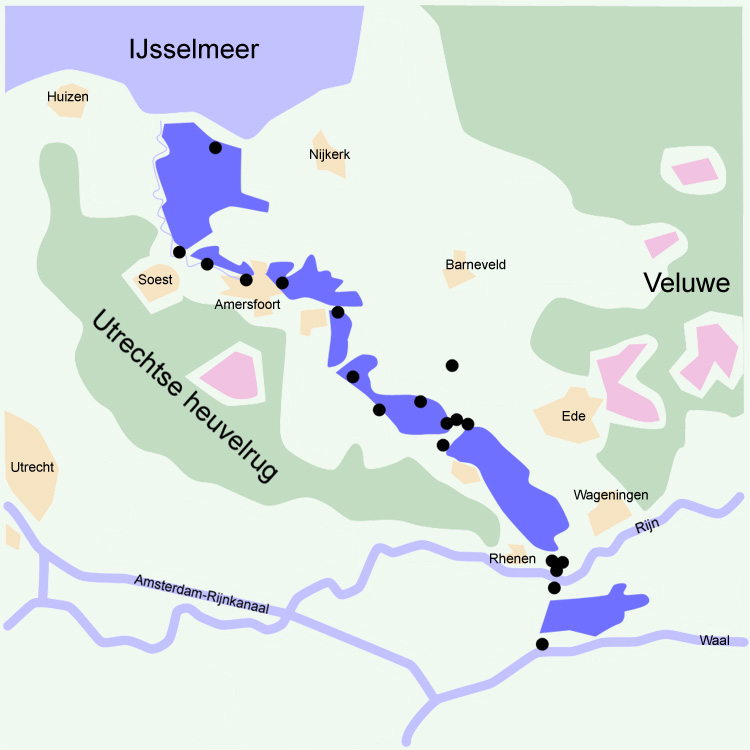
Grebbelinie

The Grebbe Line (Dutch: Grebbelinie) was a forward defence line of the Dutch Waterline, based on inundation. The Grebbe Line ran from the Grebbeberg in Rhenen northwards until the IJsselmeer.

== Early history and first decommissioning ==
The Grebbe Line was first established in 1745 as a line of defense to protect the Netherlands from invading armies. If an invasion was imminent, parts of the area between Spakenburg and the Grebbeberg were to be flooded. Until World War II, it was never actually used for that purpose; an attempt was made in 1794 to establish a defensive line against the invading French army under General Jean-Charles Pichegru, but the joint British-Dutch army abandoned the line when the French troops approached.

Throughout the 19th century, the Grebbe line was maintained as a defensive line. However, since no attacks appeared likely, it was deemed less necessary to maintain the costly fortifications, and in 1926, a large part of the fortifications was decommissioned.

== World War II ==
In 1939 the disused line was once again fortified against a German attack on the Netherlands, but due to cost issues reinforcements never reached an acceptable level. In the extensive 1939-defence plans, in which the Grebbeline would be provided with more extensive and much denser concrete reinforcements, the line would fulfill its ancient task as a forward line of defensive. These plans would however never be executed, surpassed as they were by the events of the German invasion in May 1940.

The Grebbeline by that time had been largely constructed behind vast inundations, after which a front line lay that was composed of classic trench works mixed with ferro and ferro-concrete bunkers of light and medium grade. The front-line trenches had hardly any depth and contained only half a battalion of infantry per single km of stretched line. Behind this front-line was a second row of trenches which had the function of a blocking defence should the front-line be penetrated. Reserves could be thrown in from this line and behind it were battalion and regimental CP's as well as forward light artillery positions. More to the rear were the medium and heavy artillery positions as well as divisional reserves.

The Grebbeline had three weak spots. The first two were near the city of Amersfoort, the third one near the village Rhenen, where the elevated Grebbeberg - a 150 feet high elevation - had made inundation works impossible. To combat this, half of all PAG Casemates, a type of anti-tank casemate, was constructed on the high ground. These sectors had been additionally fortified. Instead of inundations it had been decided to place forward positions ahead of the main defences. In the meantime a large and bomb-proof pump house had come under construction that, once it would be operable, would be able to flood the area in front of the Grebbeberg after all. Also this counter-measure came too late in time. This left the Grebbeberg as a very vulnerable position in the entire Grebbeline. That had not gone unnoticed by the attackers to be.

The Germans had extensively studied the battle grounds that they were to use in May 1940. Way ahead of the actual invasion German army staff officers managed to visit the Grebbeline in civilian outfits, carefully studying the actual threats and opportunities. Particularly the Rhenen area, close to the Rhine river, was noticed. It was the shortest away from German soil and seemed to be a weak spot in the Dutch defence line. The 207th Infantry Division chose to place its most formidable push at this point, for which it had the motorized SS Regiment Der Führer at its disposal too. The adjacent 227th Infantry Division, accompanied by the motorized SS Leibstandarte 'Adolf Hitler', had a less profound picture of the plans ahead. It chose to decide where to attack during the operation instead of before.

Come May 1940, the two German divisions c/w their respective SS Regiments and additional heavy artillery regiments had little trouble overcoming the first obstacles and managed to reach the Grebbeline on the second day, although the 227th division would need more time, meeting more Dutch resistance on the way. The 207th division was supported by five artillery battalions and spearheaded by the fanatic SS Der Führer regiment. The latter had first raided the Arnhem fortifications near Westervoort and subsequently massed in the city of Wageningen opposing the Grebbeline. On the second day the SS regiment managed to take the forward defences, albeit that it took them all day and losses mounted considerably. The third day they managed to penetrate the front line near the Grebbeberg itself, fighting the rest of the day and evening to widen the gap. The SS was blocked by the last Dutch defence line though, causing the commander of the 207th division to move in his own division and move SS Der Fuhrer away to the north of the Grebbeberg. The SS Regiment had by then suffered severe losses, its third battalion was out of action entirely. Overnight the Dutch planned a major counterattack by four infantry battalions, which operation was poorly executed and moreover collided with an SS assault along the northern perimeter of the Grebbeberg defences mid-day on the fourth day of the invasion. German dive bombers sealed the fate of both the Dutch counterattack and the local defences period. The 207th division assaults over the Grebbeberg itself had been successful too, although severe losses were absorbed. By the end of the day the German infantry stood in the village of Rhenen. Around night fall the Germans realized that the Dutch defences had moved back. A quick reaction force from SS motorized units was formed, but would not manage to overtake the Dutch forces, that had also left one or two blocking parties behind to slow potential enemies down. The battle of the Grebbeberg had demanded 420 Dutch and around 250 German KIA. The number of WIA was about quadruple those numbers. The Dutch had lost thousands of POWs too as well as a great deal of material and artillery pieces.

The second major battle during the German invasion was seen near the city of Scherpenzeel. The 227th Infantry Division had been slowed down by continuing Dutch cavalry efforts to counter their approach. Moreover, the SS Leibstandarte had been called off on the third day and been instructed to redeploy to the south of the Netherlands, where it had to push along the 9th Panzer Division. The 227th were on their own from then on and had decided to attack the Grebbeline near Scherpenzeel. That had been a poor selection of battlefield by the German division commander. The defences made a funny curve at this point, creating a right-angled shape with a steep corner in it. It was exactly at this point that two German infantry regiments had decided to assault the defences. By doing so they positioned themselves such that they got exposed to defensive fire from fixed and trench defences as well as artillery along two-thirds of their front and flank side. A basic offensive failure, hence a costly German defeat followed. Overnight the most forward pinned down German attackers managed to crawl back into their own lines. The 227th had lost 70 KIA during this effort, of which most of the 412th Regiment. Overnight Dutch artillery unleashed a heavy barrage on the suspected German positions, gradually bringing down the density of fire, which finally ceased shortly before dawn. The German command was quite under awe by this show of presence and had anticipated heavy fighting in the morning, but much to their surprise found the Dutch trenches deserted by morning. Behind the masquerade of the barrages the entire defence had moved back overnight. Pursued came much too late to overtake any Dutch formation before it had reached the next defences.

Directly after the cessation of hostilities a large war cemetery was established on top of the Grebbeberg. German and Dutch victims of the battle were the first to be buried at this location, but during the war the Germans would use and extend this burial ground further as their death toll rose. After the war the Dutch reburied the German victims on the summary German field of honour in Ysselsteyn, where over 30,000 Germans were buried. The Grebbeberg war cemetery now holds around 800 Dutch victims of the May War in 1940, as well as a few of later (wartime) date.

The Grebbe line was permanently decommissioned by the Dutch Government in 1951.

== Pantherstellung ==
During the war, the Germans made use of the Grebbe Line to create their own defence line, the Pantherstellung. On 26 October 1944 General Walter Model initiated the building of the Pantherstellung. At the time, it was clear that the enemy would come from not the west but the south. The Germans wanted to protect the Holland region because of the V-2 rocket attacks on London. The Germans did not want to lose the ability to fire the rockets but wanted to prevent the Allies from reaching the IJsselmeer.

The Germans had to make some changes to the design because the threat was expected from the south. From Veenendaal to Amersfoort, the defence line had the same configuration as the Grebbe Line.

== See also ==
Dutch waterlines

- Defence Line of Amsterdam
- Hollandic Water Line
- IJssel Line
- Maas Line
- Peel-Raam Line

Other

- Defence lines of the Netherlands
