= Peel-Raam Line =

Dutch defense line

- Netherlands
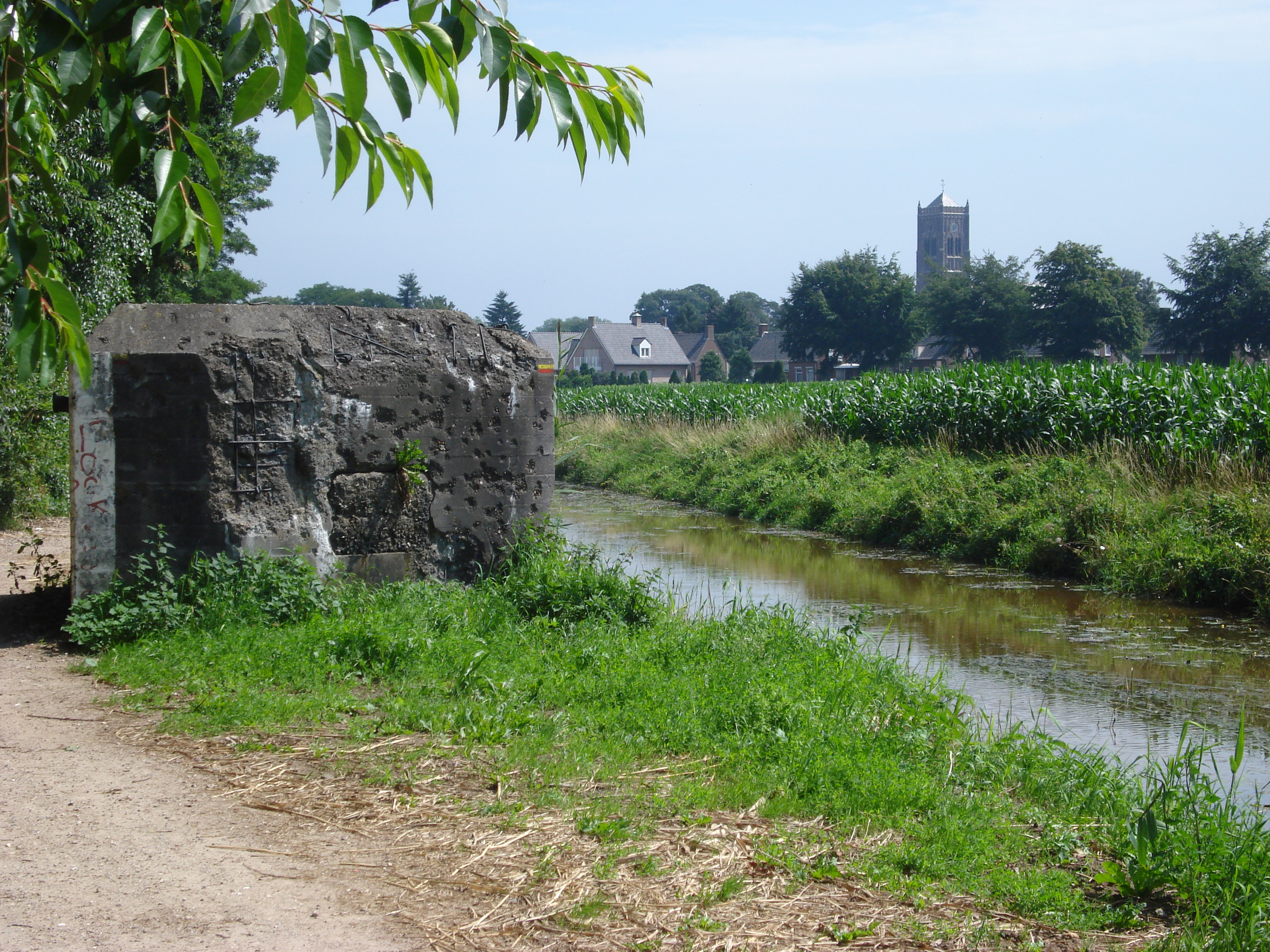
- Casemate nearby Mill and along the Defensiecanal

Site information
- Type: Defensive line
- Controlled by: Netherlands

Site history
- Built: 1939–1940
- In use: 1939–1940
- Materials: Flooded plains, earth walls, brick, concrete, steel
- Battles/wars: Battle of the Netherlands (Battle of Mill)

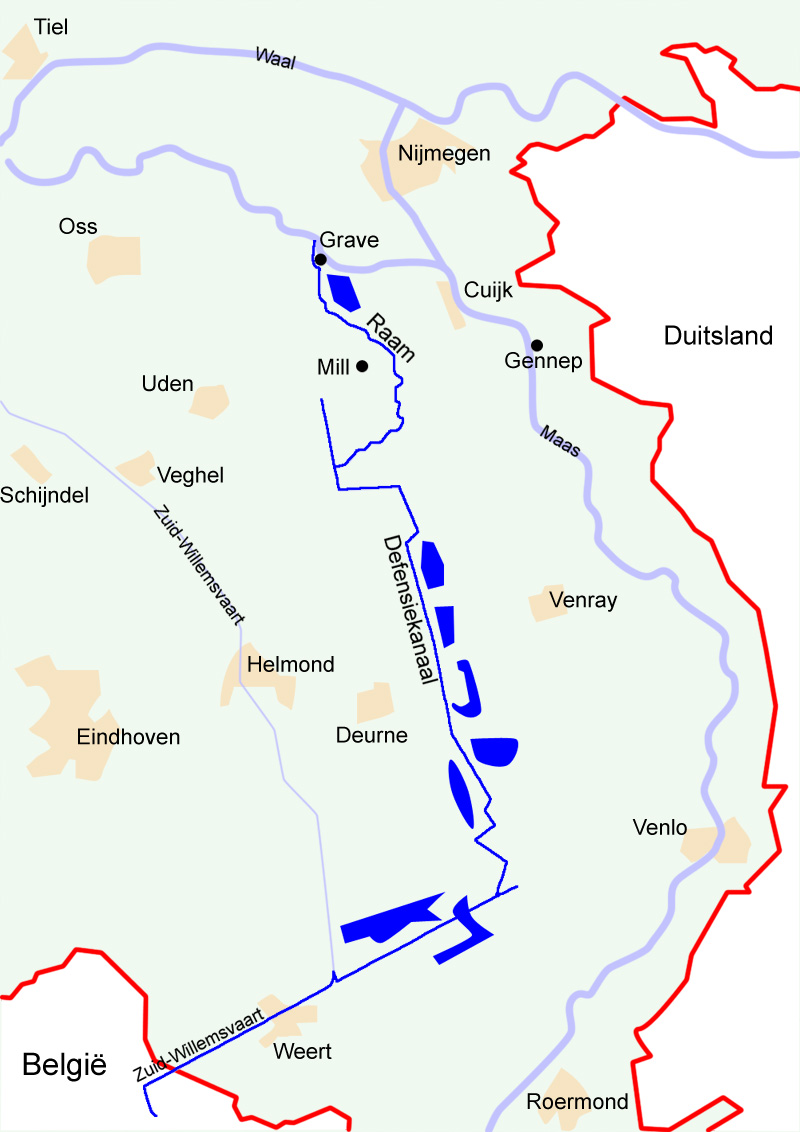
Peel-Raam Line

The Peel-Raam Line (Dutch: Peel-Raamstelling) was a Dutch defence line built in 1939 and attacked and conquered on 10 May 1940 by the German forces.

The defence line was behind the Maas Line (about 9 km to 21 km away) and started at Grave, where a barrack complex was built as part of the Peel-Raam line. From there, the line passed by Mill, Peel along the Zuid-Willemsvaart until the Belgium border nearby Weert. In the north, the defence line was connected to the Grebbe Line. The line could profit from the natural protection of the swamps, rivers and canals in the area. In the north, an artificial barrier was made, the Defensiekanaal, which was a canal. The line was made of casemates (200 m apart) and barbwire obstructions. The railway bridge on the Defensiekanaal near Mill, also had a spargel-obstruction (precursor of the Rommelspargel which the German Army used from 1943 onwards). On the first day of the German invasion, 10 May 1940, a German train crashed into this spargel-obstruction.

There were not many communication lines between the casemates and the main force of the infantry was far behind the line of casemates.

The Dutch would like to have connected their defence line with the one along the Albert Canal, in Belgium, but the Belgian army wanted a new defence line (the Orange Line (Dutch Oranjelinie) along the line Tilburg-Waalwijk and the Bergsche Maas. That meant the line was vulnerable, and the enemy could go around the line to cross into Belgian soil.

The Peel-Raam Line is, for most part, intact; particularly the northern part. The stretch between Griendtsveen and De Peel Air Base and the spot nearby Mill features several visible remains. The fortifications and the casemates in the municipalities of Deurne, Venray and Mill en Sint Hubert are protected as national monuments.

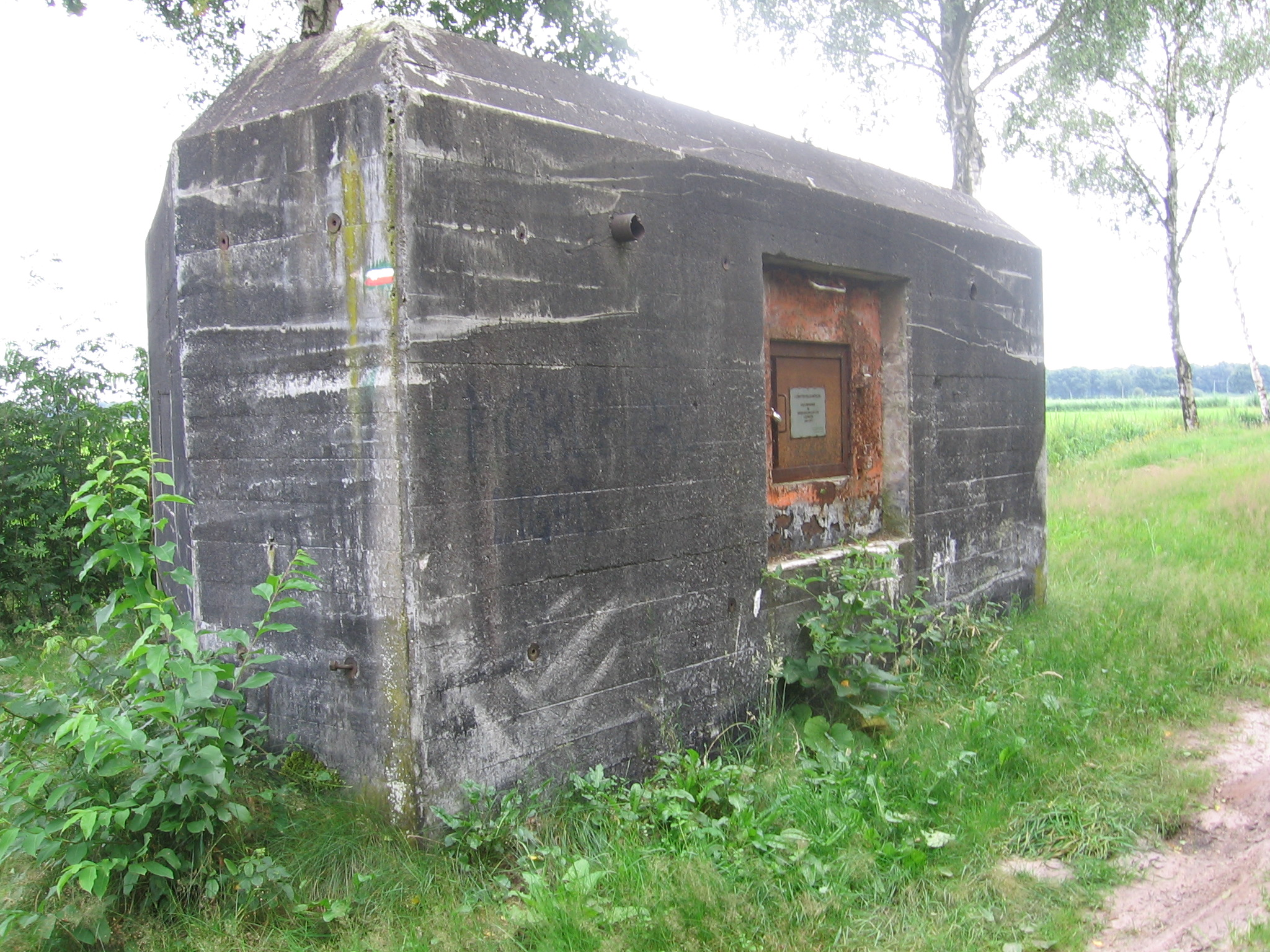
Casemate remains nearby Griendtsveen along the Defensiekanaal

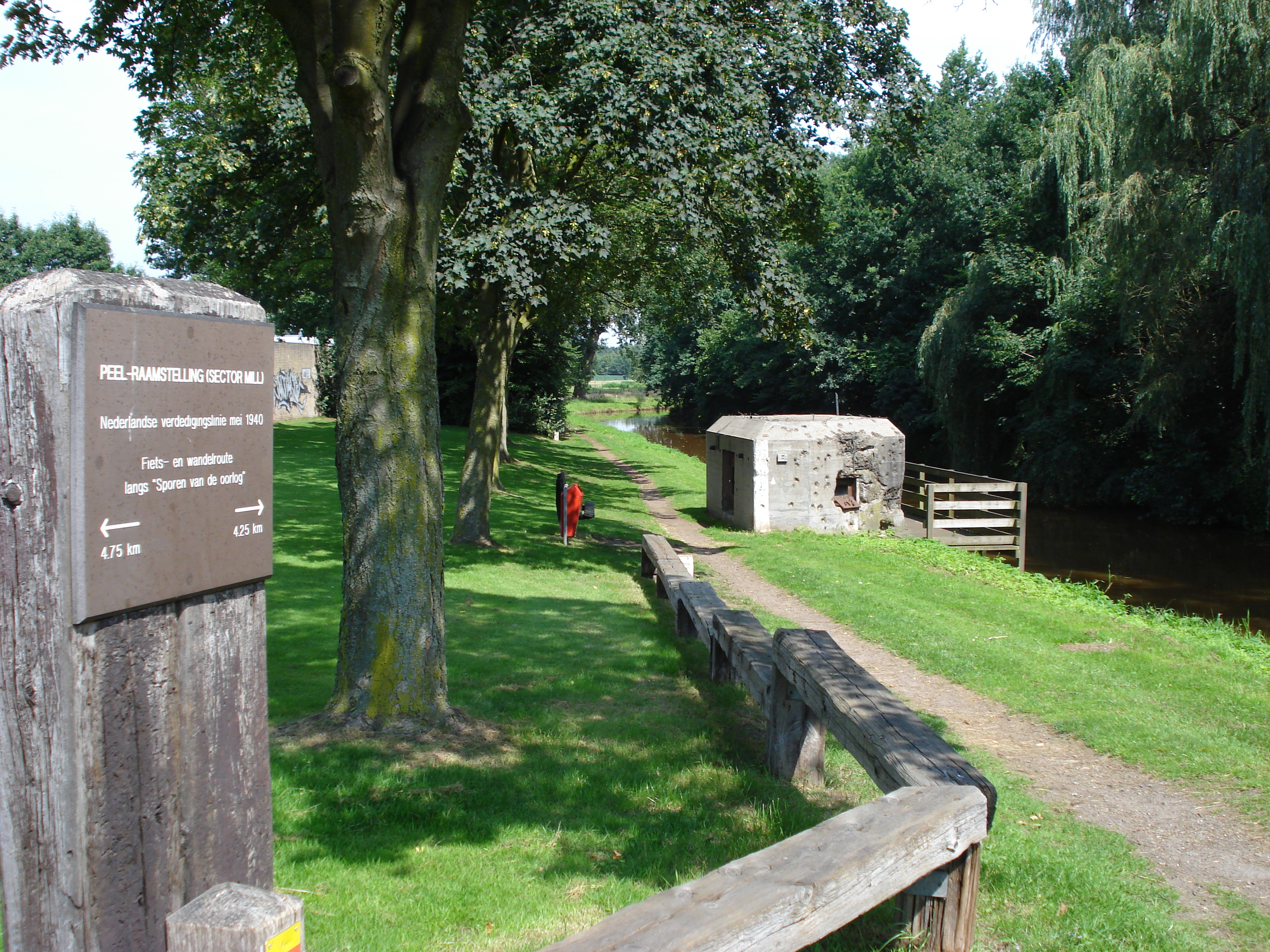
Casemate near Mill

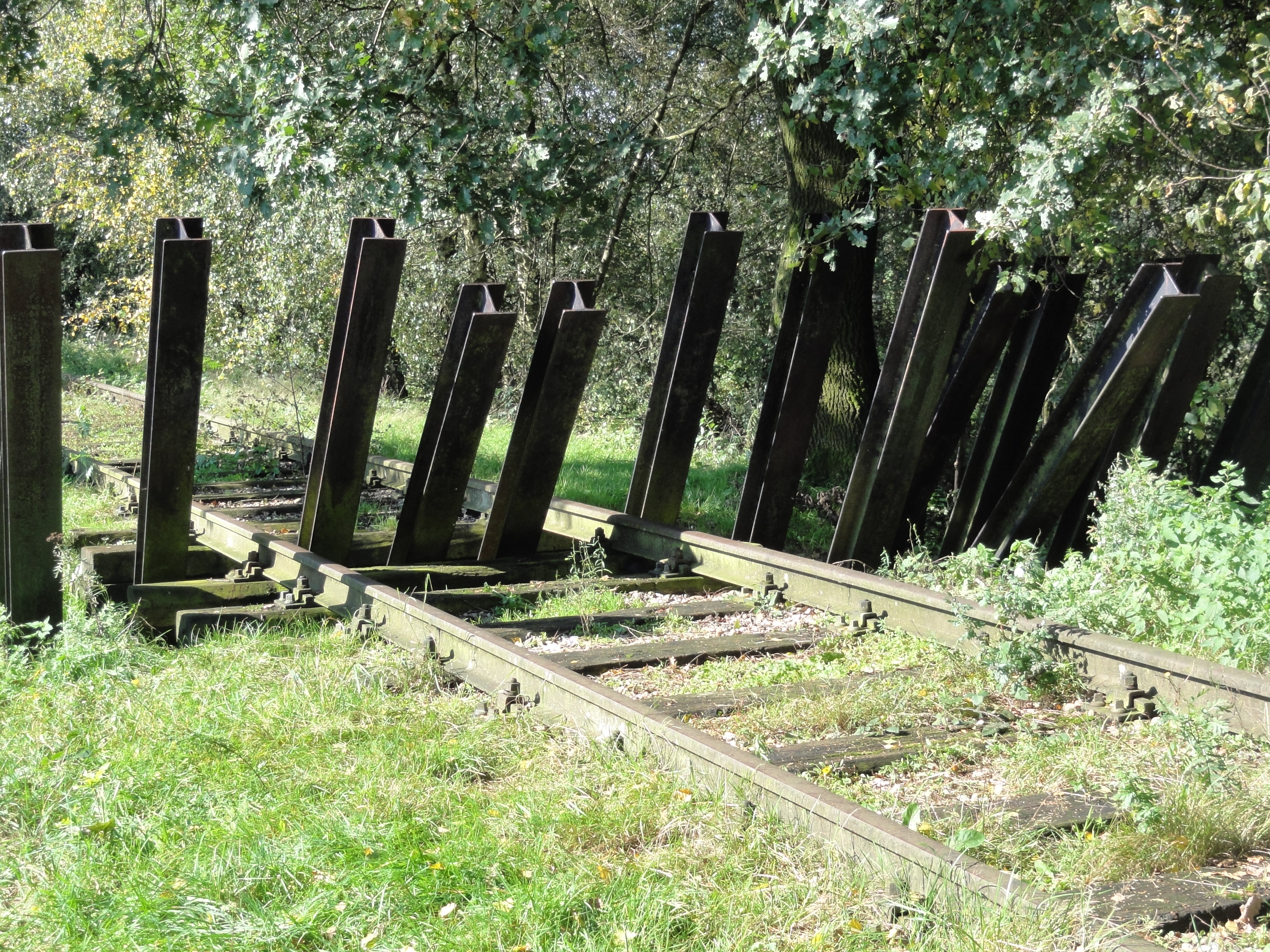
Spargelobstruction near Mill (reconstructed as national monument). 10 May 1940, a German train crashed on this obstruction.

== See also ==
- Defense Line of Amsterdam
- Dutch Water Line
- Grebbe Line
- IJssel Line
- Defense lines of the Netherlands
