= Kijfhoek =

Kijfhoek can refer to:

- Kijfhoek (village) in South Holland
- Kijfhoek (classification yard)
