= Lucien den Arend =

Dutch sculptor

- Lucien den Arend, Europa, 1986, Stainless steel, Haarlem
- Born: Lucien Armand Marco den Arend; 15 December 1943 (age 82); Dordrecht, The Netherlands
- Education: California State University, Willem de Kooning Academy
- Known for: Sculpture

Lucien Armand Marco den Arend (born 15 December 1943) is a geometric abstract sculptor. As is the case with concrete art, his work is not modeled after any existing object – his sculpture represents only itself. Most of his sculptures and Land art projects were made as public art.

== Biography ==
Den Arend was born in Dordrecht, Netherlands. In 1953 his family emigrated to the United States, where they settled in Los Angeles, California. Between 1964 and 1966 he studied art and Russian at California State University, Long Beach. During the summer of 1965 the first international sculpture symposium in the United States (and the first on a college campus) was organized on the campus of California State University at Long Beach . There he made friends with Joop Beljon, who was the participating sculptor from the Netherlands. After returning to the Netherlands he continued his art studies at the Tilburg Academy of Art, studying for an Nht teaching degree. After finishing his studies there, he attended the last year of sculpture classes at the Rotterdam Academy of Art – now the Willem de Kooning Academy. When he finished his studies there in 1970, the Rotterdam Art Foundation awarded him the "drempelprijs" for his accomplishments in the field of sculpture in that year in Rotterdam. Later he taught at the Rietveld Art Academy in Amsterdam and At the Royal Academy of Art in The Hague with Joop Beljon who was its director.

In 1969 he received his first commission for an environmental sculpture project. At that time his visiting card read “Environmental Sculpture.” He used this term for sculpture that went beyond making a sculptural object for a specific environment – the environment itself had to become the sculpture. Presently the term site-specific art covers both. He incorporated elements that we know from our environment to bring them together to form a new whole. These elements could be natural materials as well as artifacts. His first environment was an enclosed garden for a social work place in Dordrecht, DSW. In 1971 he made another environmental work, the Walburg Project, which he incorporated into an agricultural landscape, in the town of Zwijndrecht. Up to now he has made site-specific projects in more than 55 cities throughout northwestern Europe.

In the early 1970s he met Henry Moore three times during his trips to Forte Dei Marmi, where he worked at Henraux Stone Yards in Querceta, Italy. With him he discussed the area of site-specific sculpture and the overlapping area of environmental sculpture.

From the early 1970s he was active in various artists' associations, advisory committees for public art in Amsterdam, Rotterdam and other municipalities in the Netherlands. He was chairman of the stipend committee of the Dutch Ministry of Culture in 1982 and 1983 and chairman of the Dutch Sculptors' Association from 1984 to 1986. He organized international exhibitions and symposia of sculpture such as the East West Forum (Japan and The Netherlands), North Sea|Black Sea (Bulgaria and the Netherlands). In the Drechtsteden Area he realized his plan for an international sculpture park, OPAM, which was opened by Queen Beatrix of the Netherlands in 1996. In 1999 Queen Beatrix and the Bulgarian King Simeon II opened Black Sea|North Sea, a symposium and exhibition of five Bulgarian sculptors in OPAM. He received the Knight of Madara (Madara Horseman) decoration from the President of Bulgaria. In 2004 he started the organization of his second international sculpture park FOAM (Finnish Open Air Museum) in Finland to which country he moved in 2003. He now lives and works in Kangasniemi, Finland, where a collection of his sculptures is permanently exhibited on the grounds of Penttilä, an old estate in the Saimaa Lake District. He named the sculpture park POAM (Penttilä Open Air Museum).
