= Kommer Damen =

Dutch businessman

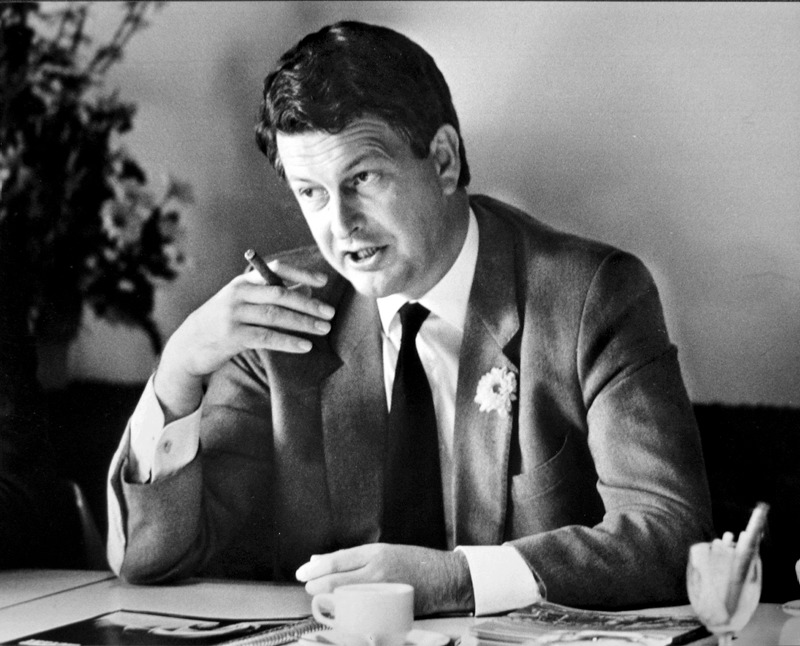
- Damen in 1984
- Born: 1944 or 1945 (age 81–82)
- Title: Chairman, Damen Shipyards
- Spouse: married
- Children: 4

Kommer Damen (born 1944) is a Dutch billionaire, and the chairman of the Netherlands-based Damen Shipyards.

Damen Shipyards was established in 1927 in the Dutch town of Hardinxveld-Giessendam by brothers Jan and Marinus Damen. In 1969 Jan Damen's son, Kommer took over, since then the company has built over 5,000 vessels.

Damen is married with four children and lives in Noordeloos, Netherlands.
