= Trijntje =

Oldest human skeleton found in the Netherlands

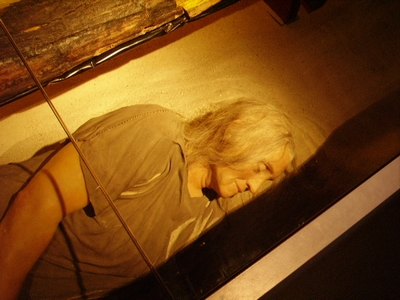
- Reconstruction of Trijntje displayed at the Rijksmuseum van Oudheden
- Born: c. 5500 BCE; Near Hardinxveld-Giessendam, Netherlands
- Died: c. 5500 BCE (aged approx. 50); Near Hardinxveld-Giessendam, Netherlands
- Resting place: Rijksmuseum van Oudheden (Leiden) → Museum De Koperen Knop (Hardinxveld)
- Occupation: Hunter-gatherer
- Era: Mesolithic
- Known for: Oldest human skeleton found in the Netherlands
- Height: 1.58 m (5 ft 2 in)

Trijntje is the name given to the oldest known human skeleton discovered in the Netherlands. The remains, belonging to a woman who lived around 5500 BCE during the Mesolithic period, were unearthed in 1997 near Hardinxveld-Giessendam during the construction of the Betuweroute railway line.

== Discovery ==
The skeleton was discovered approximately five meters underground in a peat and clay layer. This unique environment preserved her bones relatively well, particularly the skull and leg bones. The excavation required extensive measures such as the installation of sheet piling and the removal of groundwater to safely recover the remains.

Trijntje was found lying on her back in a burial pit. Near her skull, small fragments of red ochre were discovered, possibly placed as grave goods.

== Physical characteristics and lifestyle ==
Trijntje was about 1.58 meters tall and is estimated to have been around 50 years old at the time of her death. Analysis of her pelvic bones suggests she had given birth to at least one child. Her teeth showed heavy wear, likely from consuming coarse foods or using her teeth in processing animal hides. She lived in a small community of hunter-gatherers and fishers that occupied a nearby donk, a type of river dune.

The site also yielded remains of birds such as ducks, swans, geese, and herons, indicating an active hunting lifestyle. Her burial near the donk suggests the area was a semi-permanent base camp for her community.

== Name ==
The name "Trijntje" is an informal designation given by archaeologists involved in the excavation. According to Leendert Louwe Kooijmans, one of the archaeologists, a student jokingly proposed the name because the skeleton was found beneath the route of modern freight trains ("treinen" in Dutch). Another explanation suggests she was named after a local woman living near the discovery site.

== Exhibitions and significance ==
A lifelike reconstruction of Trijntje was first created in 2001 using X-ray and computer imaging technologies and was displayed in a traveling exhibition along the Betuweroute. The reconstruction was later exhibited for a decade at the Rijksmuseum van Oudheden in Leiden and is now housed at Museum De Koperen Knop in Hardinxveld-Giessendam.

In 2020, Trijntje was officially included in the Canon of the Netherlands, a historical framework used in Dutch education that highlights key figures and events.

In 2017, her skeleton was displayed to the public for the first time as part of the permanent exhibition Canon van Nederland in the Dutch Open Air Museum in Arnhem.

== Legacy ==
The discovery of Trijntje challenged previous assumptions that the western Netherlands was uninhabited during the Mesolithic period. Her remains provide insight into prehistoric life, health, and burial practices in the region.

== See also ==
- Mesolithic Europe
- Prehistory of the Netherlands
