= Maarten Schakel Jr. =

Dutch politician

Maarten Schakel Jr. (born January 5, 1947, in Noordeloos) is a Dutch politician for the CDA.

On May 1, 1982, he became mayor of Lopik, but due to his condition on June 1, 2008, Schakel took early retirement.

He is the son of the well-known ARP-CDA politician Maarten Schakel Sr..
