= Kleine-Lindt =

Coordinates: 51°50′N 4°34′E

Kleine-Lindt is a hamlet in the Dutch province of South Holland. It is located about 10 km south the city of Rotterdam, in the municipality of Zwijndrecht.

Kleine-Lindt was a separate municipality between 1817 and 1857, when it merged with Heerjansdam.
