= Maarten Schakel Sr. =

Dutch politician

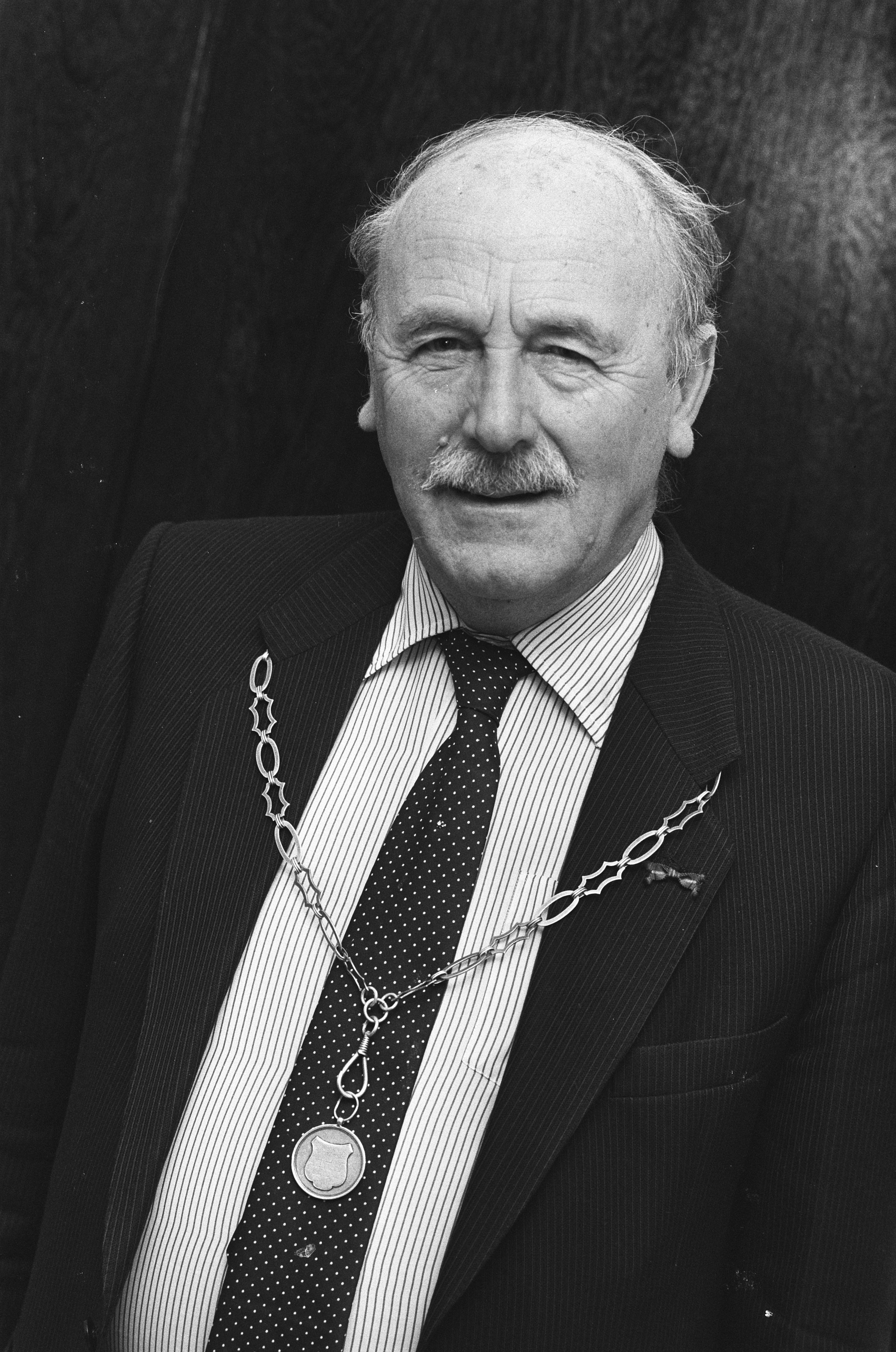
Maarten Schakel

Maarten Willem Schakel (17 July 1917, Meerkerk – 13 November 1997, Gorinchem) was a Dutch politician.

== Biography ==
Born in Meerkerk, Maarten Willem Schakel trained as a teacher and served in the Royal Netherlands Army during the German invasion of the Netherlands. During the occupation, he became active in the Dutch resistance, distributing underground newspapers and leading a local resistance group. His activities included sheltering Jewish citizens and helping those evading forced labour. Arrested in April 1945 for possession of weapons and prohibited literature, Schakel narrowly escaped execution thanks to his resistance comrades.

After the war, he resumed teaching and in 1946 became the youngest mayor in the Netherlands, governing Noordeloos, Hoornaar, and Hoogblokland for four decades while also building a political career with the Anti-Revolutionary Party (ARP), later the Christian Democratic Appeal (CDA).

As a parliamentarian from 1964 to 1981, Schakel represented the ARP and later the CDA, focusing on traffic, water management, internal affairs, and agriculture. Known for his eloquence and adherence to conservative principles, he often took independent positions, such as opposing expansions of state pensions and questioning national waterworks projects. Schakel was a staunch defender of party unity and expressed strong views on foreign affairs, notably regarding apartheid-era South Africa and Portuguese colonial territories. His war-time experiences shaped his political outlook, influencing his stance on issues such as the release of convicted war criminals. Within the CDA, he rose to vice-chairman of the parliamentary group and was a member of the House of Representatives.

Schakel remained committed to his local community throughout his career, serving as mayor of Noordeloos until municipal reorganisation in 1986. He combined steadfast Christian conviction with a pragmatic approach to politics. His legacy includes numerous publications on local history, governance, and wartime memoirs.

== Personal life ==
Maarten Schakel Jr. is his son.
