= Evangelical Theological Academy =

The Evangelical Theological Academy (Dutch: Evangelische Theologische Academie, ETA) is a Dutch interdenominational institute for evangelical theological education, in Zwijndrecht, Netherlands. The ETA was founded in 1985 by five theologically educated evangelical Christians, who were inspired by the growing demand for theological schooling through part-time or distance education.

== Overview ==
The ETA training programs includes undergraduate (Bachelor of Theology) and graduate-level theological studies (Master) in the Dutch language. Their information shows 3 different program categories: Part-Time, Distance and Congregational (tailored to the needs of a specific church and/or denomination).

On April 17, 2010 ETA celebrated their 25th anniversary in the town of Putten. The ETA celebrated their anniversary with a symposium about Christian spirituality. The school started with 1 course and is now able to offer 6 different special theological programs. Since September 2009 the ETA is providing training in 2 more cities: Alkmaar and Deventer, bringing the number of cities with an ETA training centre to 5: Zwijndrecht, Steenwijk, Rotterdam, Alkmaar and Deventer.

== Accreditation ==
The school states upfront that the ETA is not accredited in the Netherlands. However, ETA students were able to receive credits under an agreement that was valid until 1 January 2010 when transferring to the Christelijke Hogeschool Ede, a biblically inspired vocational university that has national educational accreditation. Graduates of the ETA have found employment at various churches, schools and institutions.
