= Johan Simons =

Dutch theatre director

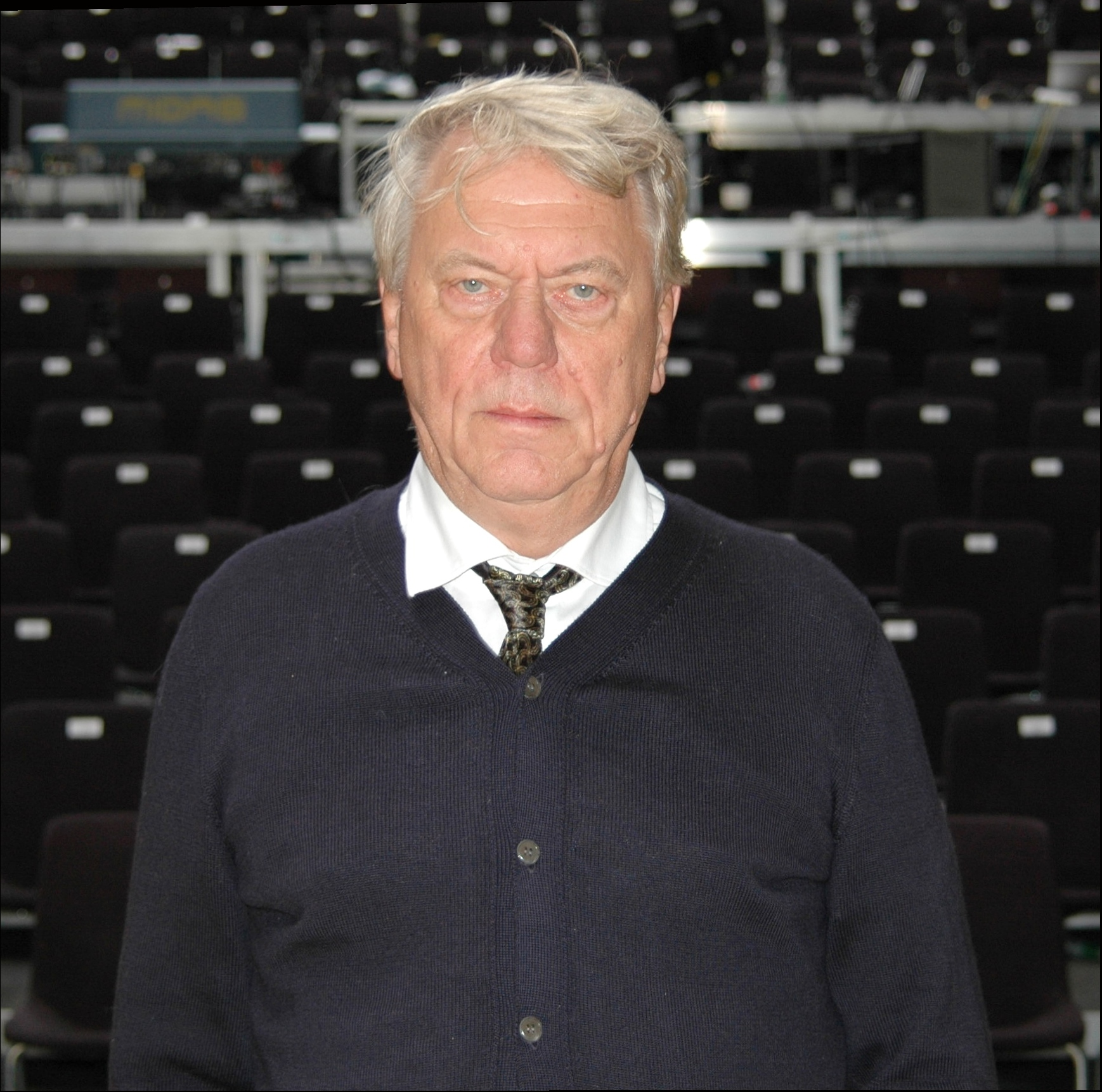
- Johan Simons in 2017
- Born: 1 September 1946 (age 80); Heerjansdam, Netherlands
- Occupations: Theatre director, teacher

Johan Simons (born 1 September 1946) is a Dutch theatre director.

Simons received his education at the Rotterdam Dance Academy and the Maastricht Academy of Dramatic Arts. He also taught directing in Maastricht for a number of years.

== Career ==
Since 2000, Simons has received international recognition for his directing. He has been regularly invited as a guest director for leading German-language theatre companies, including the Schauspielhaus Zürich, the Schauspielhaus Stuttgart, the Ruhrtriennale, and the Münchner Kammerspiele. In addition to directing plays, he has directed several operas, including Verdi's Simon Boccanegra at the Opéra Bastille in 2006 and Mozart's Il Seraglio at the De Nederlandse Opera in 2008.

Simons was appointed artistic director of the Münchner Kammerspiele in 2010. He was the director of the Ruhrtriennale from 2015 to 2017. Simons caused controversy by directing a play in Austria in 2015 called "Die Neger" ("The Negroes"), which used blackface, prompting protests and accusations of racism.

== Europe Theatre Prize ==
In 2000, Johan Simons and Paul Koek received the Europe Prize Theatrical Realities awarded to the Hollandia Theatergroep, with the following motivation:

The Hollandia Theatergroep, founded in 1985 by choreographer/director Johan Simons and composer/director Paul Koek, holds an important position in the Dutch theatre world. From the outset the group's plays have been distinguished by their ensemble dimension and by their capacity to become integrated with places outside the usual theatre circuits. The Hollandia Theatergroep has devoted itself to theatrical research without ever disassociating itself from a strong participation in current social and political debates. The Hollandia Theatergroep has based its exploration of language on famous texts, especially ancient and modern tragedies, but also on non-theatrical literary motifs. In addition, the group has developed a mix of languages that permits it to perform within the sphere of the theatre, dance and the most sophisticated musical expressions. The Hollandia Theatergroep's appeal lies in the variety of fields it explores and in the poetical power of its performances that are charged with unusual polemical force. The group deserves European and international acclaim. It is exceptional.
