= Hardinxveld-Giessendam =

- Municipality
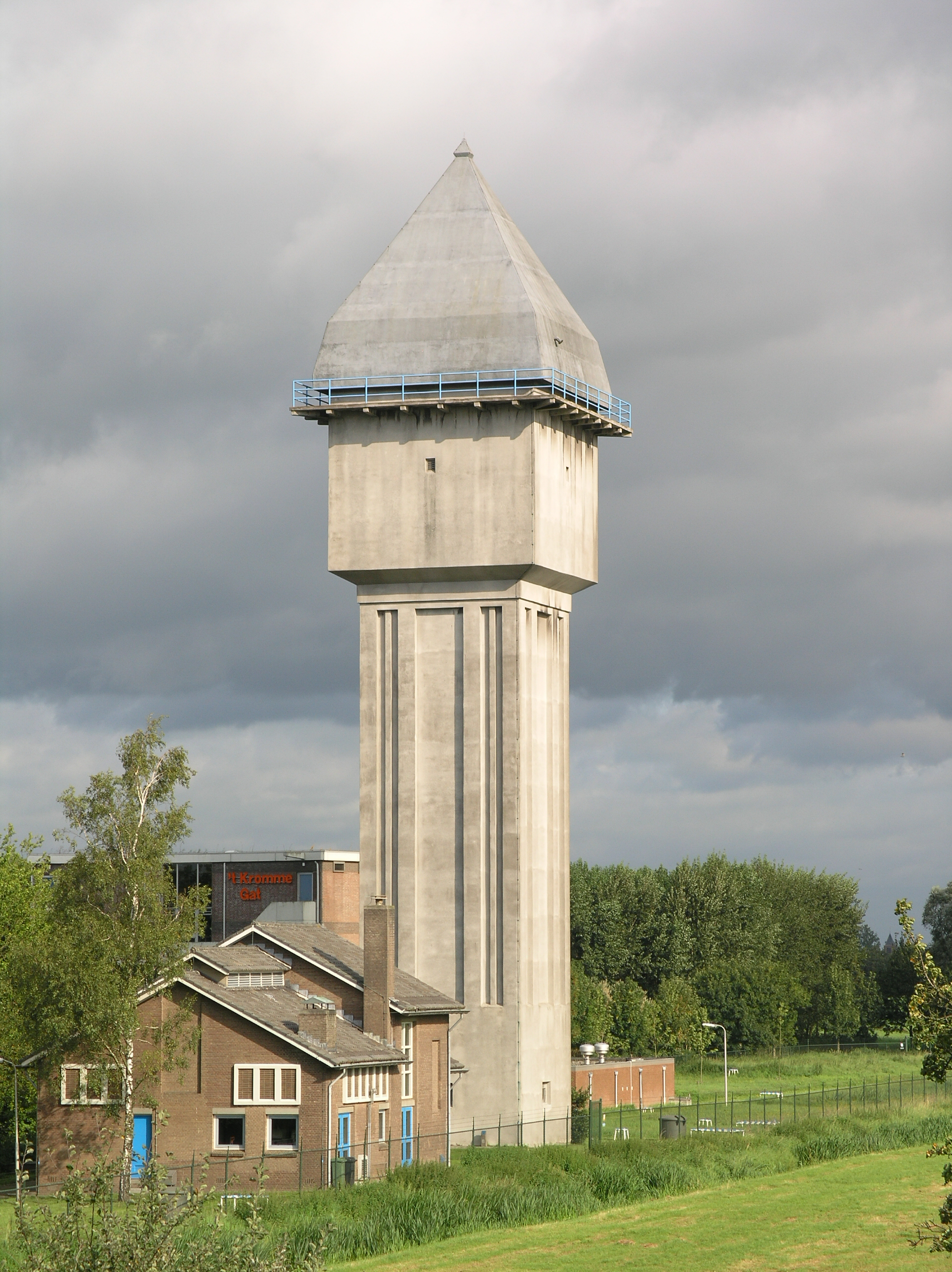
- Water tower Hardinxveld

- Flag Coat of arms

- Location in South Holland
- Coordinates: 51°49′N 4°50′E
- Country: Netherlands
- Province: South Holland
- Established: 1 January 1957

Government
  - Body: Municipal council
  - Mayor: Dirk Heijkoop (CDA)

Area
  - Total: 19.35 km^{2} (7.47 sq mi)
  - Land: 16.91 km^{2} (6.53 sq mi)
  - Water: 2.44 km^{2} (0.94 sq mi)
- Elevation: 3 m (9.8 ft)

Population (January 2021)
  - Total: 18,413
  - Density: 1,089/km^{2} (2,820/sq mi)
- Time zone: UTC+1 (CET)
  - Summer (DST): UTC+2 (CEST)
- Postcode: 3370–3373
- Area code: 0184
- Website: www.hardinxveld-giessendam.nl

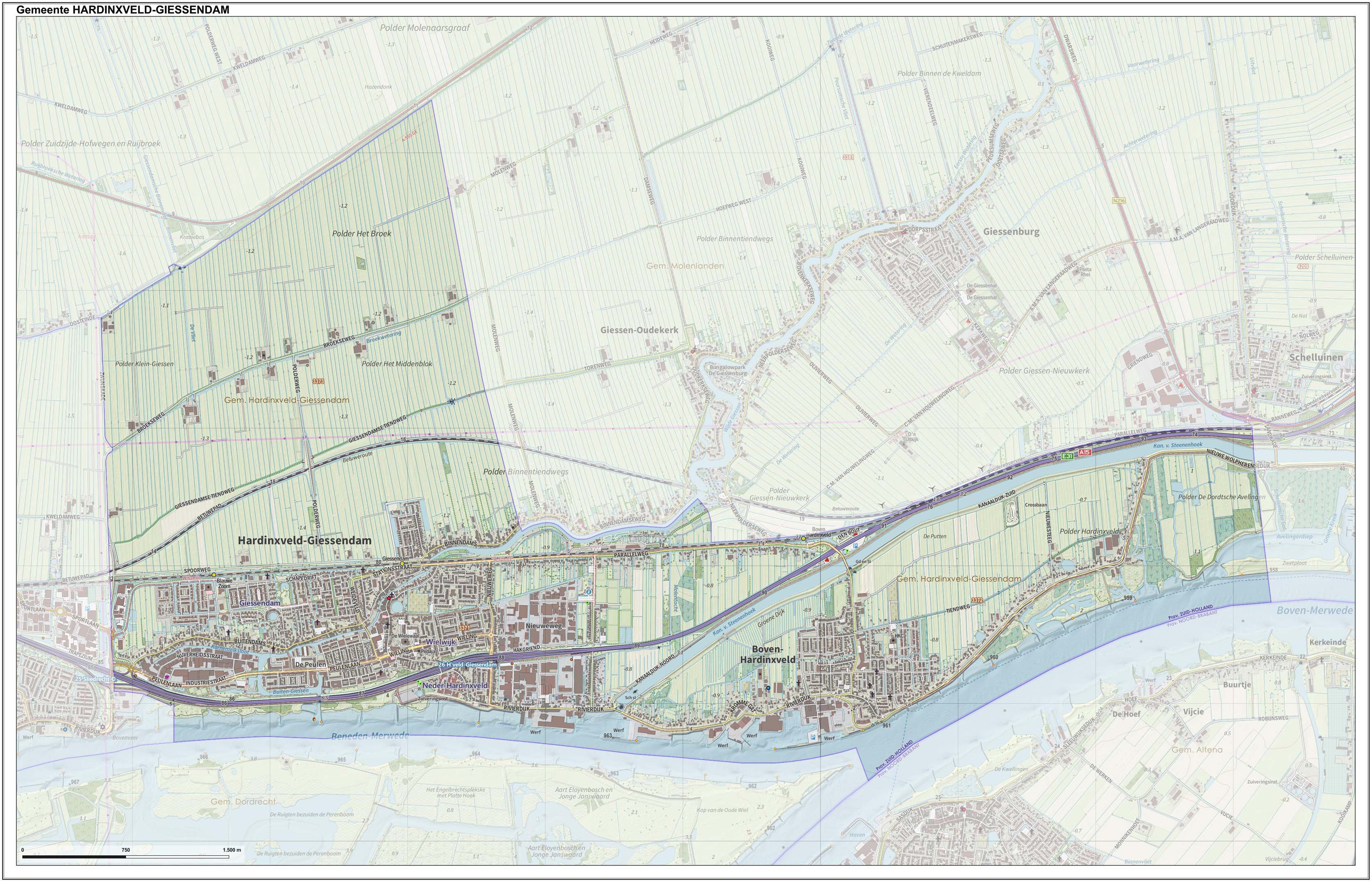
Topographic map of the municipality of Hardinxveld-Giessendam, June 2015

Hardinxveld-Giessendam (Dutch pronunciation: [ˈɦɑrdɪŋksfɛlt ˌxisə(n)ˈdɑm]) (Note: In isolation, Giessendam is pronounced [ˌɣisə(n)ˈdɑm].) is a municipality in the western Netherlands, in the province of South Holland. It is located about 10 km east of Dordrecht, on the river Beneden-Merwede. The municipality had a population of 18,413 in 2021 and covers an area of 19.35 km^{2} (7.47 sq mi) of which 2.44 km^{2} (0.94 sq mi) is water.

The municipality of Hardinxveld-Giessendam consists of the two population centres Giessendam/Neder-Hardinxveld and Boven-Hardinxveld. Until they were merged in 1957, Giessendam and Hardinxveld were two municipalities, consisting of only a few streets and dykes and only a few thousand inhabitants.

The town's economy is for a large part dependent on ship building (e.g. Damen Shipyards Group) and general contracting. Several industry parks are present.

== History ==
The village Hardinxveld is one of the oldest settlements of the Alblasserwaard. It is known that in 1105 a priest was present here, and therefore a church as well. Since 1282, Hardinxveld became a grand fiefdom. Through the centuries it suffered from warfare such as the Gelder Wars and the Eighty Years' War

The name Giessendam first appeared in 1231 and is most likely derived from the dam on the little peat river Giessen. This dam was the boundary between Hardinxveld and Giessendam for a long time.

The municipality was formed in 1957 by the merger of the former municipalities Hardinxveld and half of Giessendam. The rest of Giessendam's territory went to the new municipality of Giessenburg which in turn was merged with Giessenlanden in 1986.

Since the 1960s, the municipality has grown significantly through the development of new neighbourhoods such as De Peulen, de Wielwijk, de Westwijk, and Tienmorgen. In recent years, the municipality had serious fiscal problems, resulting in direct oversight by the Province for a period of time. Considerable savings had to be made, necessitating significant increases to the relative low taxation in the town.

== Archeology ==
Before the construction of the Betuweroute Highspeed Railway, thorough soil research was performed in 1997. During that research in Hardinxveld-Giessendam, some archeological items were found, including a 7500-year-old skeleton of a woman, now named "Trijntje". It is the oldest skeleton found in the Netherlands up to this time. Since December 2003, the reconstructed corpse has been added to the collection of the Rijksmuseum van Oudheden (National Museum of Antiquities) in Leiden. In April 1998, a dugout canoe was found.

== Transportation ==
The Hardinxveld-Giessendam railway station, on the Elst–Dordrecht railway, is situated in the municipality.

== Notable people ==
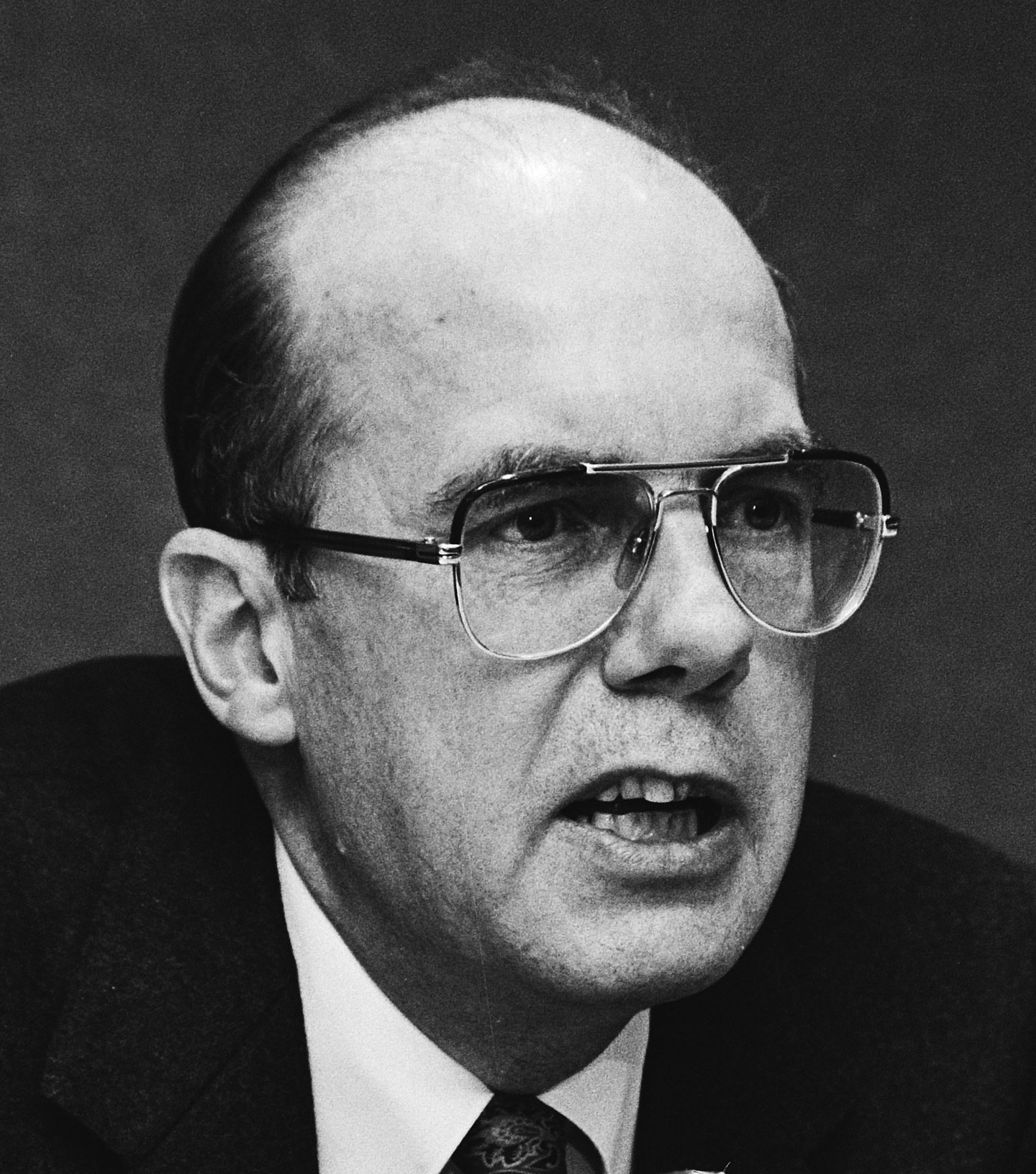
Job de Ruiter, 1980

- Job de Ruiter (1930 in Giessendam – 2015) a Dutch politician, diplomat and jurist
- Kommer Damen (born 1944) a Dutch billionaire, and the chairman of Damen Shipyards
- Bert de Ruijter (born 1952 in Hardinxveld) known as Leigh Blond, is a Dutch composer, singer and songwriter.
- Erik de Bruin (born 1963 in Hardinxveld-Giessendam) a record-holding retired Dutch discus thrower and shot putter
- Jaap Wolterbeek (born 1943 in Hardinxveld) Dutch photographer and cinematographer
- Kim Putters (born 1975 in Hardinxveld-Giessendam) chairman of the socialeconomic council

== Gallery ==
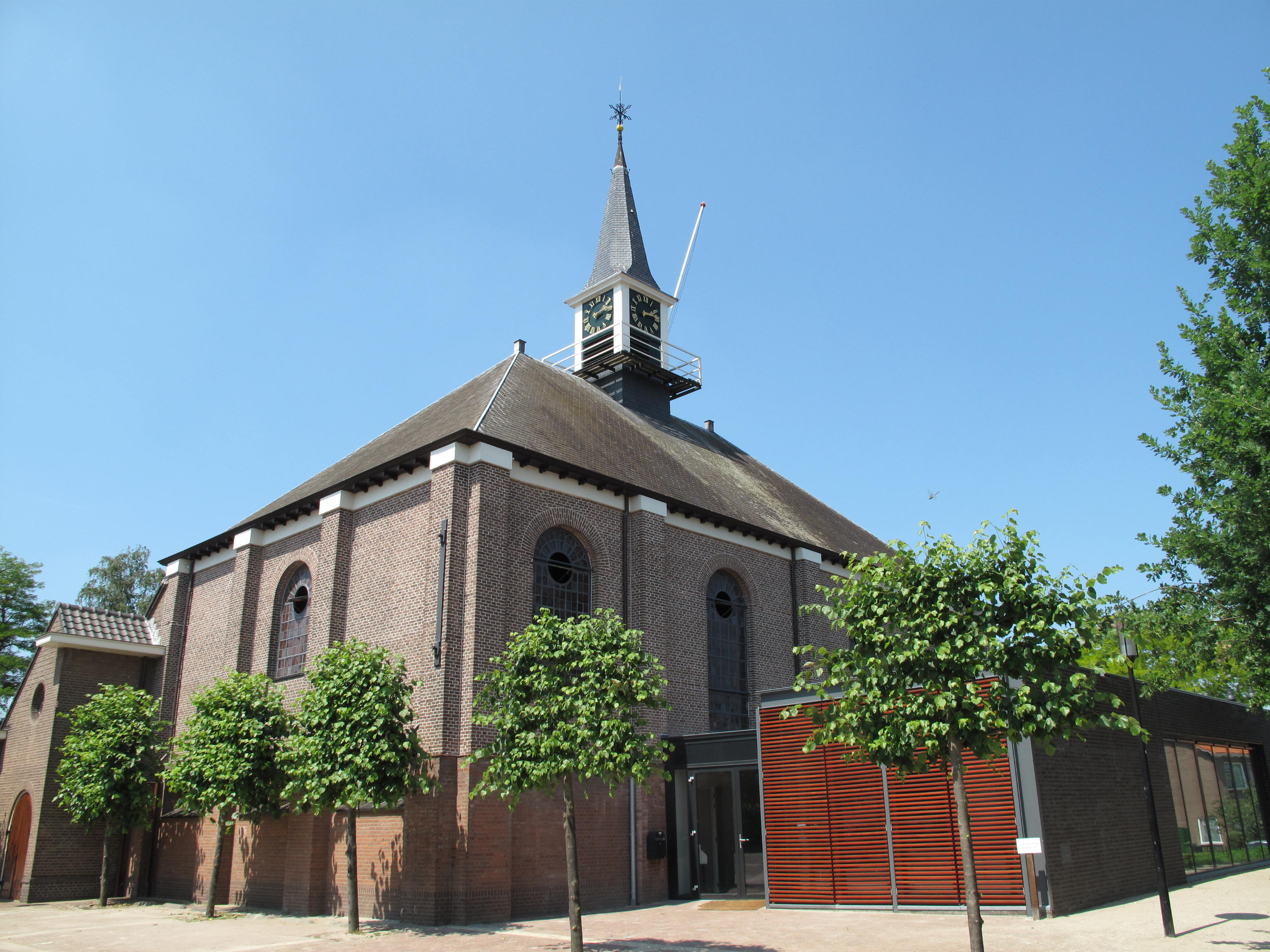
Boven-Hardinxveld, church

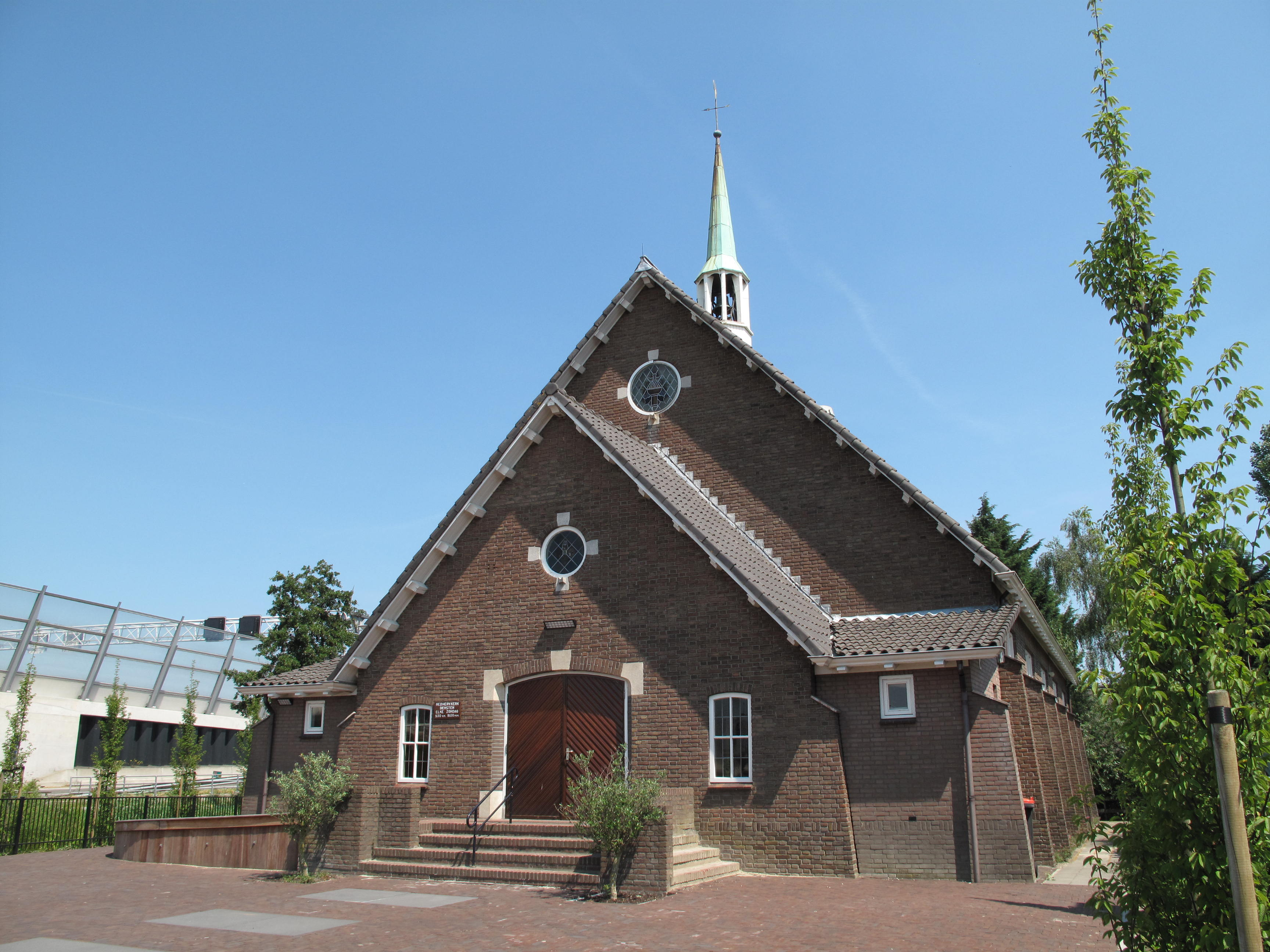
Hardinxveld-Giesendam, church

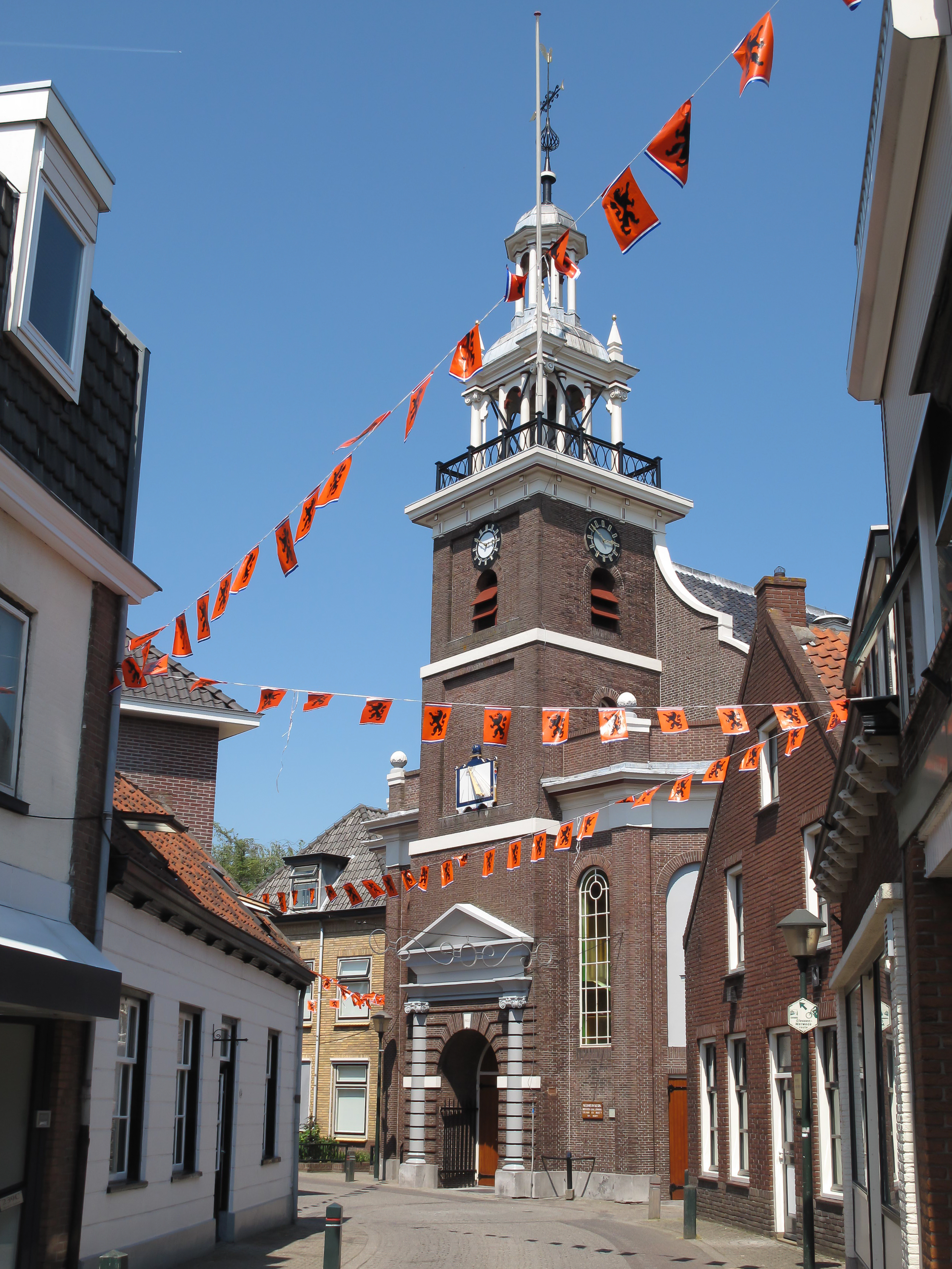
Hardinxveld-Giesendam, church

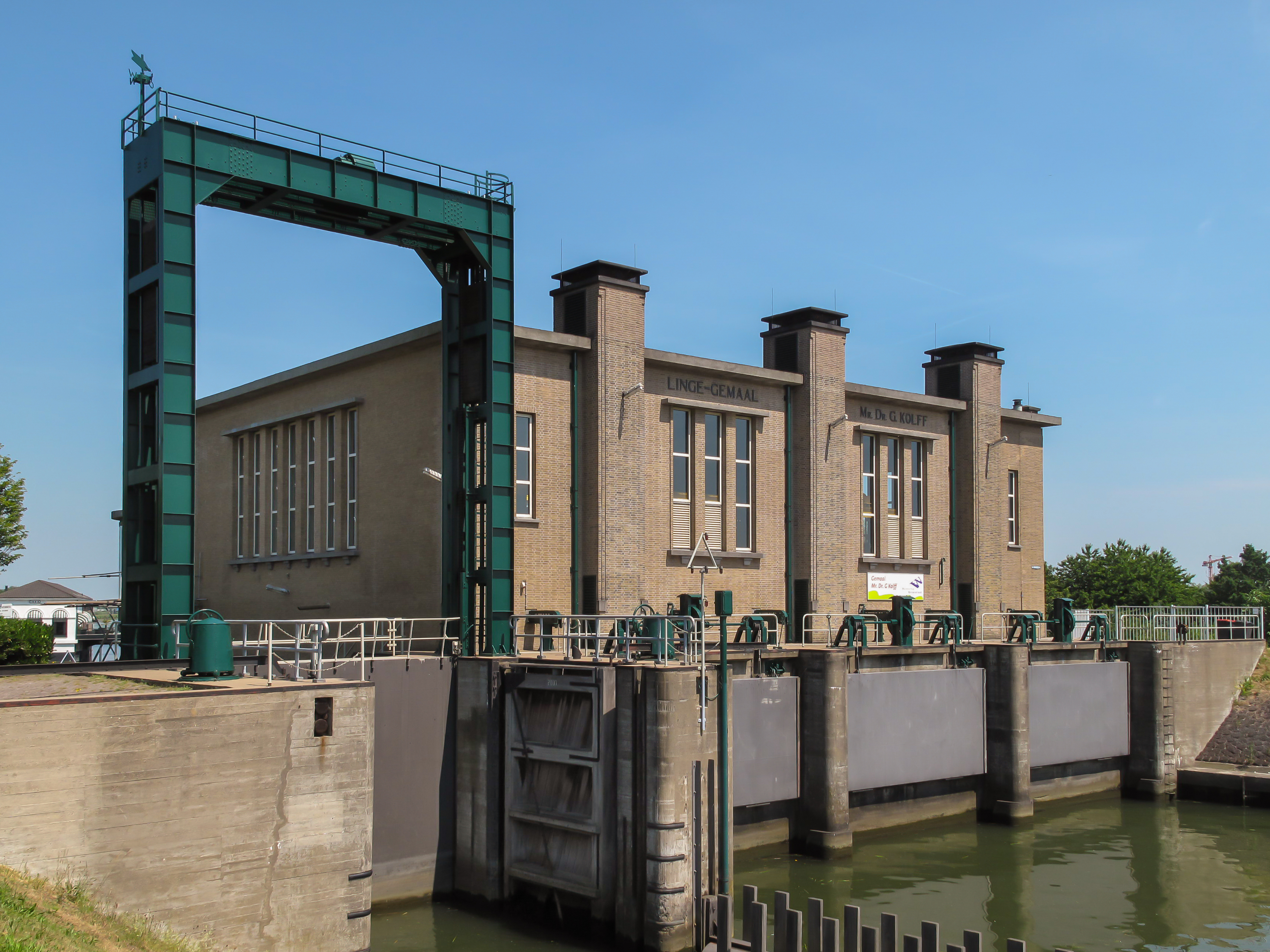
Boven-Hardinxveld, pumping-engine
