= Jeroen Sluijter =

Dutch baseball player

- Third baseman
- Born: 2 April 1975 (age 51); Zwijndrecht, Netherlands
- Bats: Right Throws: Right
Medals
Men's baseball
Representing Netherlands
European Baseball Championship
Gold medal – first place	2003 Netherlands	National team
Silver medal – second place	2010 Germany	National team

Jeroen Sluijter (born 2 April 1975 in Zwijndrecht, South Holland, Netherlands) is a Dutch baseball player who played for the Netherlands national team in the 2008 Summer Olympics and other international tournaments as well as in the Honkbal Hoofdklasse.

== Playing career ==
Sluijter debuted in the Hoofdklasse in 1993 with Twins Oosterhout. He moved to ADO in 1996 and then Neptunus in 1997. With Neptunus, he became Hoofdklasse champion each year from 1998 to 2005, one of the longest dynasties in Netherlands baseball history.

Sluijter briefly played college baseball for a junior college in Alabama, later saying he left because he was homesick.

Sluijter debuted with the Dutch national team in the 1997 World Port Tournament, not returning to the team until 2002, when he appeared in the Haarlem Baseball Week. He went 1-for-4 as a backup infielder; in the championship game, he was a late substitute for Evert-Jan 't Hoen and did not bat in a 5–4 loss to the United States. In the 2002 Intercontinental Cup, he was 1-for-3, backing up former Triple-A player 't Hoen at second and former Major League Baseball player Ralph Milliard at shortstop. With Neptunus, he had the best batting average in the 2002 European Cup.

Sluijter played for the Dutch in three events in 2003. In the 2003 World Port Tournament, he was a starter and hit .292 with 7 walks. He led the Netherlands with 2 hits (in 3 tries) in a 3–2 loss to Cuba in the gold medal game, also making one error at third base. He was 0-for-2 with 2 walks and a run in parts of four games in the 2003 European Championship, which the Netherlands won. In the 2003 Baseball World Cup, he only played one inning in the field as the backup second baseman to 't Hoen and went 0-for-1 at bat.

In the 2004 Hoofdklasse season, Sluijter was the captain of Neptunus and tied for sixth with 9 doubles. He was 0-for-3 in the 2004 Haarlem Baseball Week and did not play in the gold medal game, a Dutch win over Cuba. It was his last time on the national team for four years. In 2005, Sluijter tied for eighth in the league with 26 runs, albeit only tied for fifth on Neptunus. He hit only .213/.323/.272 that year and fielded .940 at the hot corner. The next year, he had his best season yet, batting .324/.380/.394. He tied Sidney de Jong and Reily Legito for seventh in the league with 10 doubles and was 12th in batting average. His .947 fielding percentage led the Hoofdklasse third baseman. 2007 was a down year as he hit .220/.348/.295 and fielded .899 at third.

In the 2008 European Cup in Regensburg, Germany, Sluijter hit .444/.500/.833 with 7 runs and 7 RBI in 5 games. Against the Templiers de Sénart, he was 3-for-3 with 2 homers and a walk to lead Neptunus. He was eighth in the Cup in batting average, tied Legito and Giuseppe Mazzanti for second in RBI (one behind Gene Kingsale) and tied four others (including Luis Ugueto and Pavel Budský) for the home run lead (2). He tied for fourth in runs, two behind leader Simon Kudernatsch. Sluijter went 1-for-2 with a walk and a run in the 2008 Haarlem Baseball Week, his first appearance with the national team in four years. Thanks in part to an injury to Hainley Statia, Sluijter remained with the Dutch team for the 2008 Summer Olympics in Beijing. He batted 1-for-7 with a sacrifice hit in the Olympics. He batted 3-for-9 in the 2010 European championship, as the Dutch finished second.

Sluijter retired from playing after the 2010 season.

In June 2024, Neptunus retired Sluijter's uniform number 5.

== Coaching career ==
After ending his playing career, Sluijter coached youth baseball in Rotterdam. He was the manager of the Rotterdam team that played in the 2011 Little League World Series. He was named a coach for Neptunus in August 2012.

== Personal life ==
Sluijter and his wife have three children. Their oldest son has also played for Neptunus and Oosterhout.
