= Betuweroute =

Dutch railway line

- Route (red) of the Betuweroute

Overview
- Owner: ProRail
- Locale: South Holland and Gelderland, Netherlands

Service
- Type: Freight railway

History
- Opened: 16 June 2007

Technical
- Line length: 159 km (99 mi)
- Track gauge: 1,435 mm (4 ft 8 1/2 in) standard gauge
- Electrification: 25 kV 50 Hz; Kijfhoek yard: 1.5kV DC
- Operating speed: 120 km/h (75 mph)
- Signalling: ETCS Level 2 Kijfhoek yard: ETCS Level 1 and ATB-EG

The Betuweroute is a double track freight railway between Rotterdam and Germany. Betuweroute is the official name, after the Betuwe area through which the route passes. The line is popularly called Betuwelijn, after an older local rail line in the same region. The line extends into Germany as the Oberhausen–Arnhem railway, and it is part of Project No. 5 of the Trans-European Transport Network (TEN-T).

== History ==
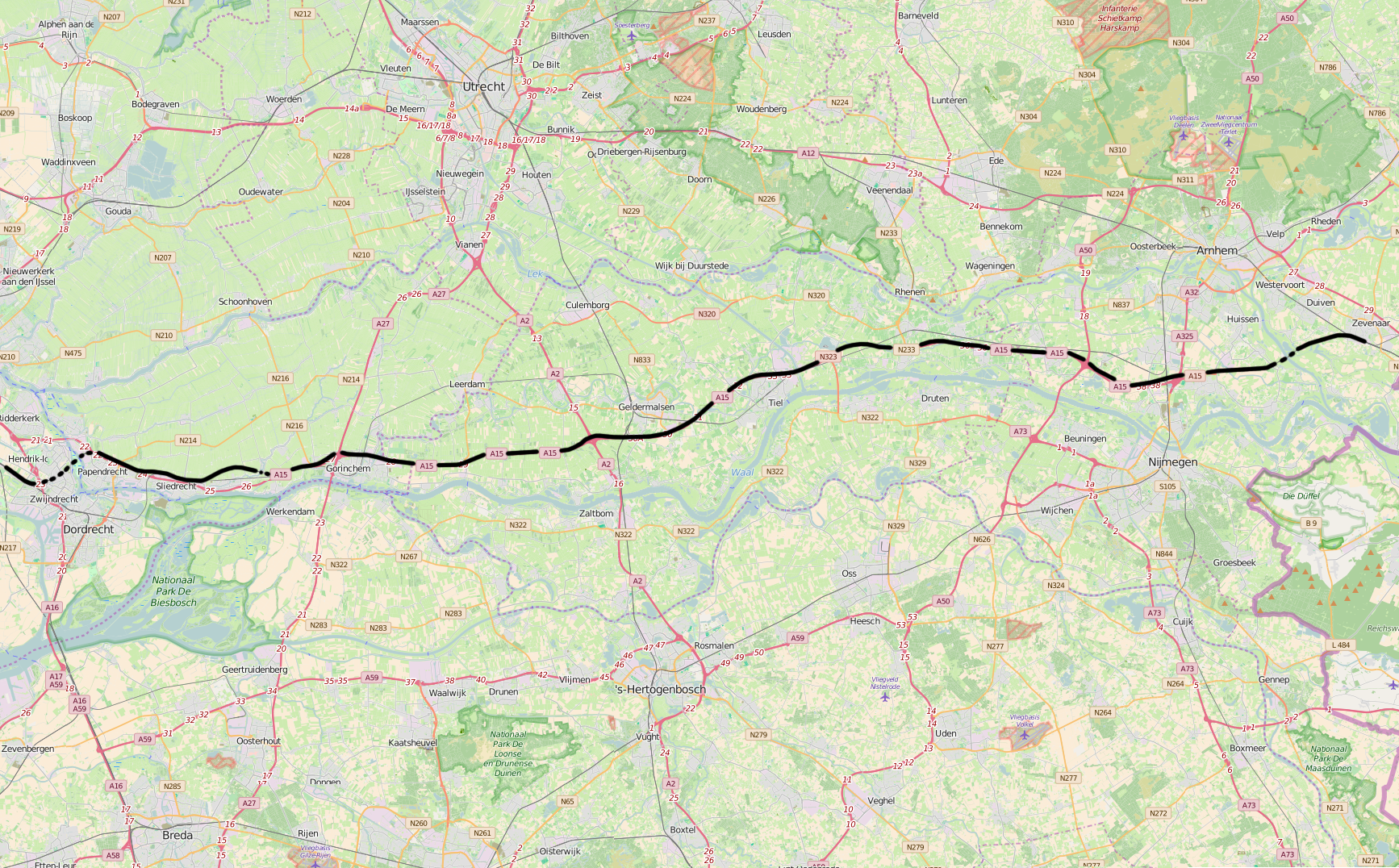
Map of the Betuweroute

In 1985 the Van Bonde Commission began to investigate the future of west–east transport. The main advocate of the proposed line was the then minister Neelie Kroes, later Commissioner in the European Union until 2014. In 1992 the German and Dutch governments signed the Treaty of Warnemünde, which addressed enhancing rail traffic and focused on the tracks from Amsterdam and Rotterdam to Duisburg. The original plan was for three branch rail lines towards Germany. The northern branch via Oldenzaal was abandoned in 1999 and the southern branch via Venlo was abandoned in 2004. Also in 2004, the courts forbade the construction of a large logistics centre near the village of Valburg.

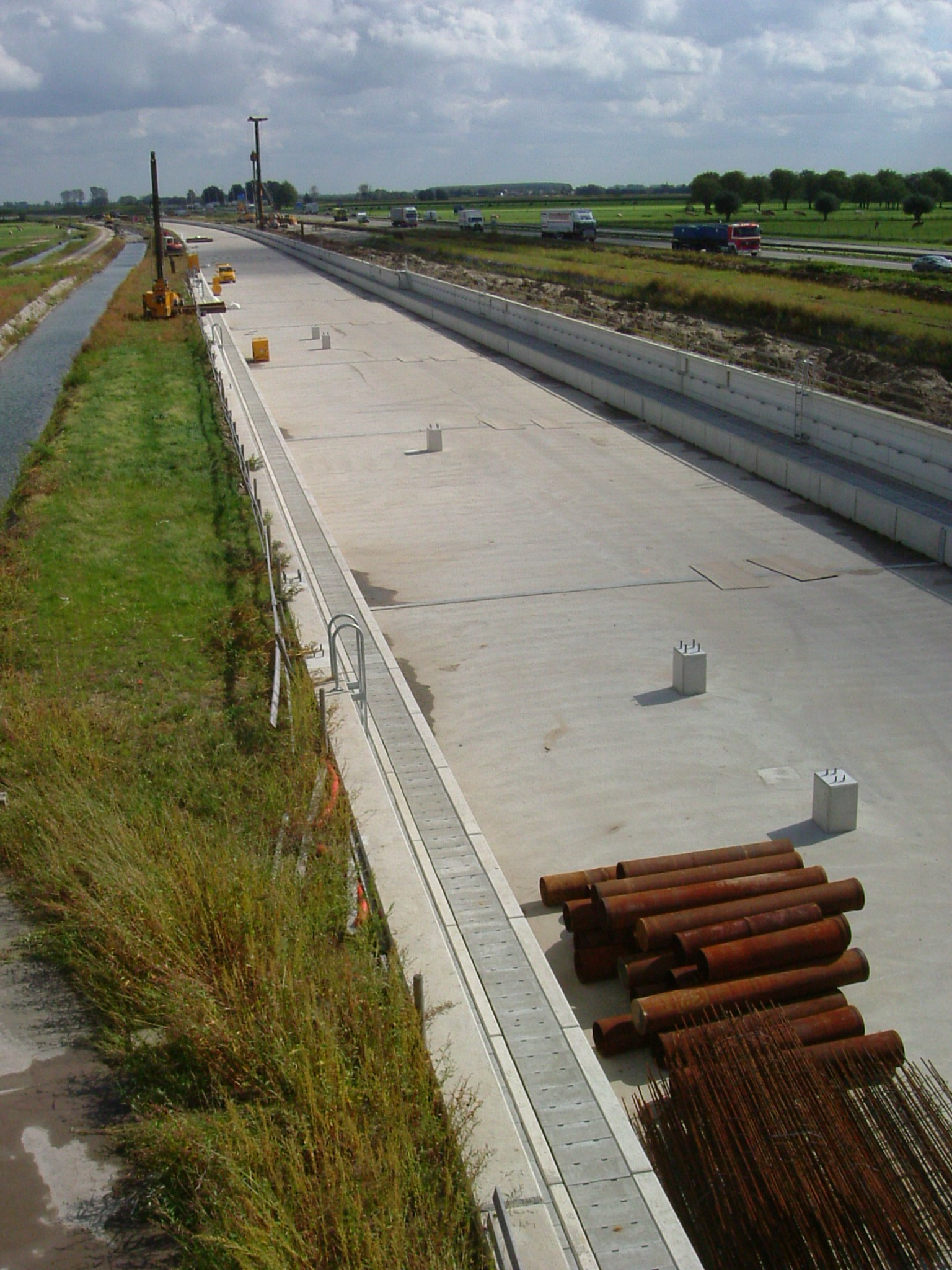
Construction of the Betuweroute in Meteren in 2004

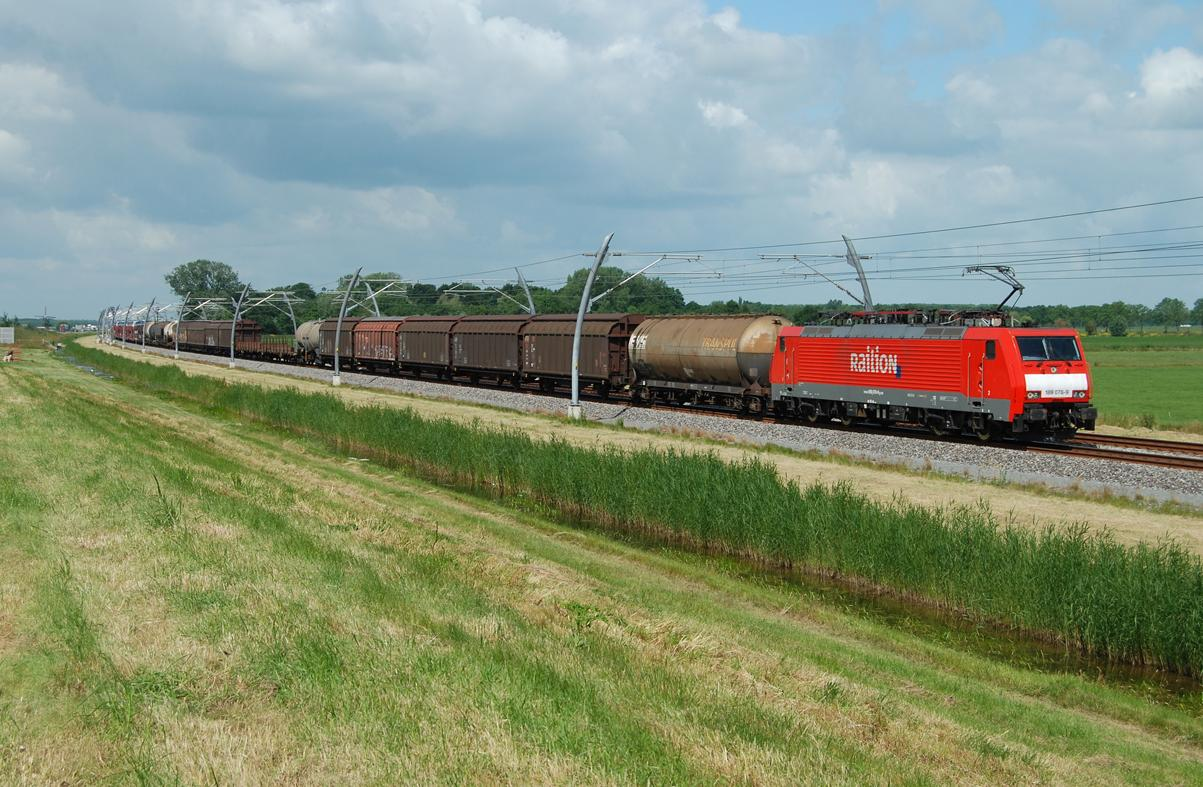
A Railion class 189 hauled train using the Betuweroute near Deil

In 1988 the Dutch state-owned passenger railway company NS began work on the line. Delayed by two years, the railway was finished mid-2007. The final cost was 4.7 billion euros, more than twice the original budget of 2.3 billion euros, and more than quadruple the initial estimate from 1990 of 1.1 billion euros.

The large and rising costs, and criticism about government funding, promoted the government to seek private financing for the line, without success. On 16 June 2007, Queen Beatrix of the Netherlands presided over the opening ceremony for the 160 kilometers (99 mi) line that connects Rotterdam to the German border. Despite the TEN-T and bilateral agreements, Germany did not expect to complete reconstruction of their lines that connect with Betuweroute before 2015.

== Route ==
The route is a direct line from the Maasvlakte to Zevenaar, connecting the Port of Rotterdam to Germany.

Compared with the previous rail route between Barendrecht and Elst the main deviations are:

- Line now north of Zwijndrecht and Papendrecht
- Line now north of Gorinchem and south of Leerdam
- Line now north of Tiel
- From the south side of Elst the line runs straight to Zevenaar

== Infrastructure ==
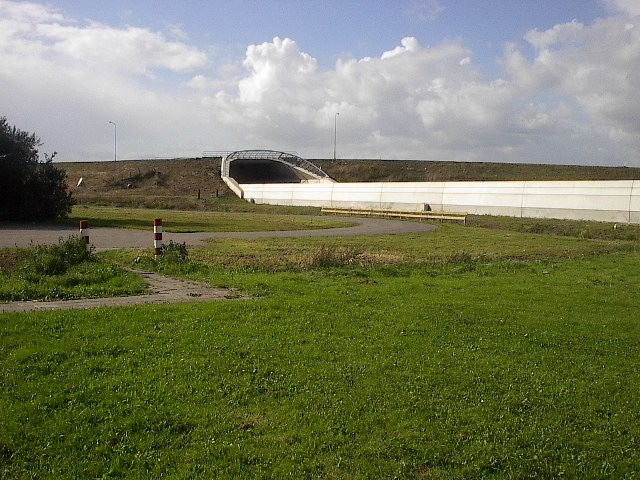
A tunnel for the Betuweroute near highway A15

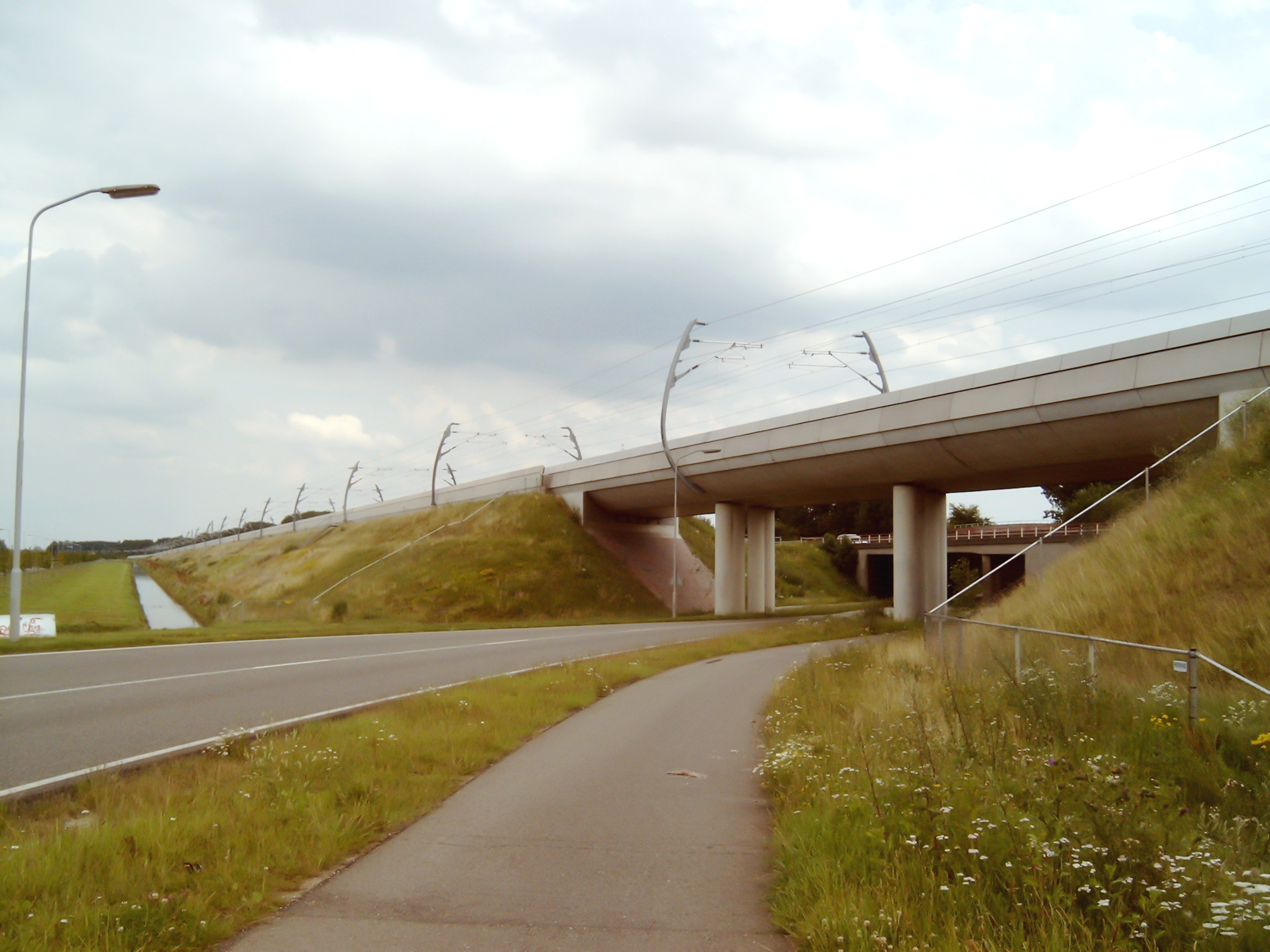
A bridge near Tiel

Trajectory of the Betuweroute

The most striking infrastructure that was built or reconstructed as part of the Betuweroute includes:

- Container terminals in Rotterdam, Rail Service Centre Maasvlakte, Rail Service Centre Waalhaven, and Maasvlakte 2.
- The 3 kilometers (1.9 mi) long Botlekspoortunnel under Rotterdam harbour replaces the antiquated Botlek bridge. The bridge remains in service as backup and for regional traffic. Space around the tunnel was so constrained that after completing the first tube, the tunnel boring machine had to be dismantled inside the tube. The parts were then returned to the starting point and reassembled to bore the second tube.
- The classification yard Kijfhoek between Barendrecht and Zwijndrecht was reconstructed.
- Barendrecht railway station has 9 tracks in a 1.5 kilometers (0.93 mi) long structure. Much of the structure is covered with a layer of earth, to reduce noise. On top is a new city park. At the station itself, 4 of the tracks and their platforms have a glass roof. Nearby tracks cross on two levels.
- Tunnel were built under Pannerdensch Kanaal near Angeren. Instead of the projected bridge, a 2.7 kilometers (1.7 mi) tunnel was bored, to protect the landscape and environment. The tunnel entrances were designed to blend in with the landscape. The tunnel itself has large lockable doors at each end, to prevent a flood on one side of the canal inundating the region on the opposite bank. Because two endangered animal species were found in the vicinity of the tunnel, a new habitat was laid out for the Great crested newt and the Natterjack Toad, as this video shows.

== Specifications and features ==
- The route is electrified at 25 kV AC and signaled using the ERTMS2 standard and AF Track Circuits. Electrification meets new European standards, but Dutch locomotives could not use the line's power because they run on a different voltage. The German extension of the route does not comply with the new ERTMS2 standards, and also uses another voltage, thus limiting usability of the track. Custom-made locomotives were needed. The first new-spec locomotive was delivered to Railion in December 2007.
- Tunnels, viaducts and other parts of the railway are engineered to be 4.0 m wide and 6.15 m high in order to allow double stacked container trains under overhead wires, although no such trains will be in use on this route for years to come. The overhead wires were installed at standard height, to accommodate locomotives with standard pantographs. This and viaducts on the connecting lines prevent use of double-stacked containers. In the future, the overhead electrification wires could be raised to allow for double stacking without much effort or cost.
- For the section from Rotterdam to the large Kijfhoek classification yard, existing track was reconstructed. New construction occurred from Kijfhoek to Zevenaar near the German border, which is most of the remaining three quarters of the line.
- The total length of noise insulation panels on both sides of the track is 160 kilometers (99 mi), the same as the route length.
- Roll bars along the track keep derailed cars from toppling.
- 5 tunnels and several roofed sections add up to a length of 20 kilometers (12 mi).
- There are 190 passages to allow wildlife to cross.
- There are no level crossings, but instead 130 bridges and viaducts.
- Once the German line signaling and other infrastructure are updated, the Betuweroute's capacity will be 10 trains per hour in each direction.

== Use ==
When the line opened, project managers hoped within five years to reach a daily average of 150 freight trains. In the first six months of operation, the unfinished German connection and problems with safety equipment caused traffic to be light. Usage increased steeply over the years 2008–2011. By mid-2011, 78% of all freight trains between Rotterdam and the German border took the Betuweroute. The other freight trains travelled via either Venlo or the border at Bad Bentheim, or used the conventional railway through Arnhem to Emmerich am Rhein Beginning in 2009, the heaviest trains in Germany and the Netherlands, 6,000 tonne trains, transported iron ore between the port of Rotterdam and Dillingen in Germany using the Betuweroute. As of 2019, the Betuweroute carried 4.2 billion ton-kilometers of cargo and 2.3 million train kilometers.

Unlike other Dutch rail network tariffs, the tariff charged to train operators to use the Betuwe rail line is not calculated by train weight but by the distance the train travels. Between 2008 and 2011 the tariff has increased progressively from €1.41 per train kilometer to €2.33 per train kilometer.

Quarterly number of trains over the Betuweroute.
Q	No. of trains
2008-I	1,000
2008-II	1,200
2008-III	1,250
2008-IV	1,900
2009-I	2,350
2009-II	2,200
2009-III	2,300
2009-IV	3,000
2010-I	3,900
2010-II	4,300
2010-III	4,400
2010-IV	5,000
2011-I	5,850
2011-II	6,300

== Controversy ==
Many Dutch people, experts and politicians such as members of parliament opposed construction of the Betuweroute. The Dutch Ministry of Transport, Public Works and Water Management received 14,000 complaints against the northern branch alone, which was cancelled in 1999. GroenFront! (Green Front), one among dozens of activist groups, was responsible for 35 confrontations in 1999–2001. University professors and official institutions heavily criticised the role of the government and ministers in relation to Betuweroute.

The main concerns about the Betuweroute were:

- Cost - Even at the original budget of 2.3 billion euros, there was much discussion about economic viability. Initial hopes of attracting private investors turned out to be totally unfounded. In 2000 the Court of Audit convicted the government of having issued unrealistic forecasts about cost, environmental effects and usage of the Betuweroute, as well as insufficient cost control. They stated that promoting river transport should have been considered as a realistic alternative. In 2004 the Centraal Planbureau (Bureau for Economic Policy Analysis), concluded that construction of the line would never pay for itself.
- Landscape - The line passes through the Groene Hart (Green Heart) of the Randstad and the Betuwe. There were concerns the rail line would damage both regions. The Groene Hart is a more or less rural area amid the Netherlands' largest cities. The Betuwe is a less densely populated green region along the major Dutch rivers. Both feature classic Dutch polder landscapes. Opposition to the original plans forced the construction of additional tunnels, which further increased the construction budget.
- Environmental issues - Many environmentalists and neighbours fiercely resisted the new line due to concerns about noise, dangerous chemical spills and the fragmentation of animal habitats. In response, extra noise insulation panels, tunnels and wildlife passages were built.
- Alternatives - As the Court of Audit concluded in its 2000 report, river transport was and still is a realistic alternative. River transport is cheaper, more flexible, safer and not much slower. The Dutch barge fleet is the largest and among the most modern in Europe, capable of transporting freight to the German industrial heartland with minimal government investment. Major Dutch rivers including Merwede, Waal and parts of the Rhine, Maas (Meuse), IJssel and Lek run roughly alongside the Betuweroute. Likewise, the A15, an excellent albeit congested highway, parallels the railway for 95 kilometers (59 mi).

Several parts of this Controversy section are based on a Dutch scientific investigation.

== Municipalities along Betuweroute ==
- Alblasserdam
- Barendrecht
- Buren
- Duiven
- Geldermalsen
- Giessenlanden
- Gorinchem
- Hardinxveld-Giessendam
- Hendrik-Ido-Ambacht
- Lingewaal
- Lingewaard
- Molenwaard
- Neder-Betuwe
- Neerijnen
- Nijmegen
- Overbetuwe
- Papendrecht
- Rotterdam
- Sliedrecht
- Tiel
- Zevenaar
- Zwijndrecht

== See also ==
- Elst–Dordrecht railway
