= Drechtsteden =

Coordinates: 51°49′N 4°41′E

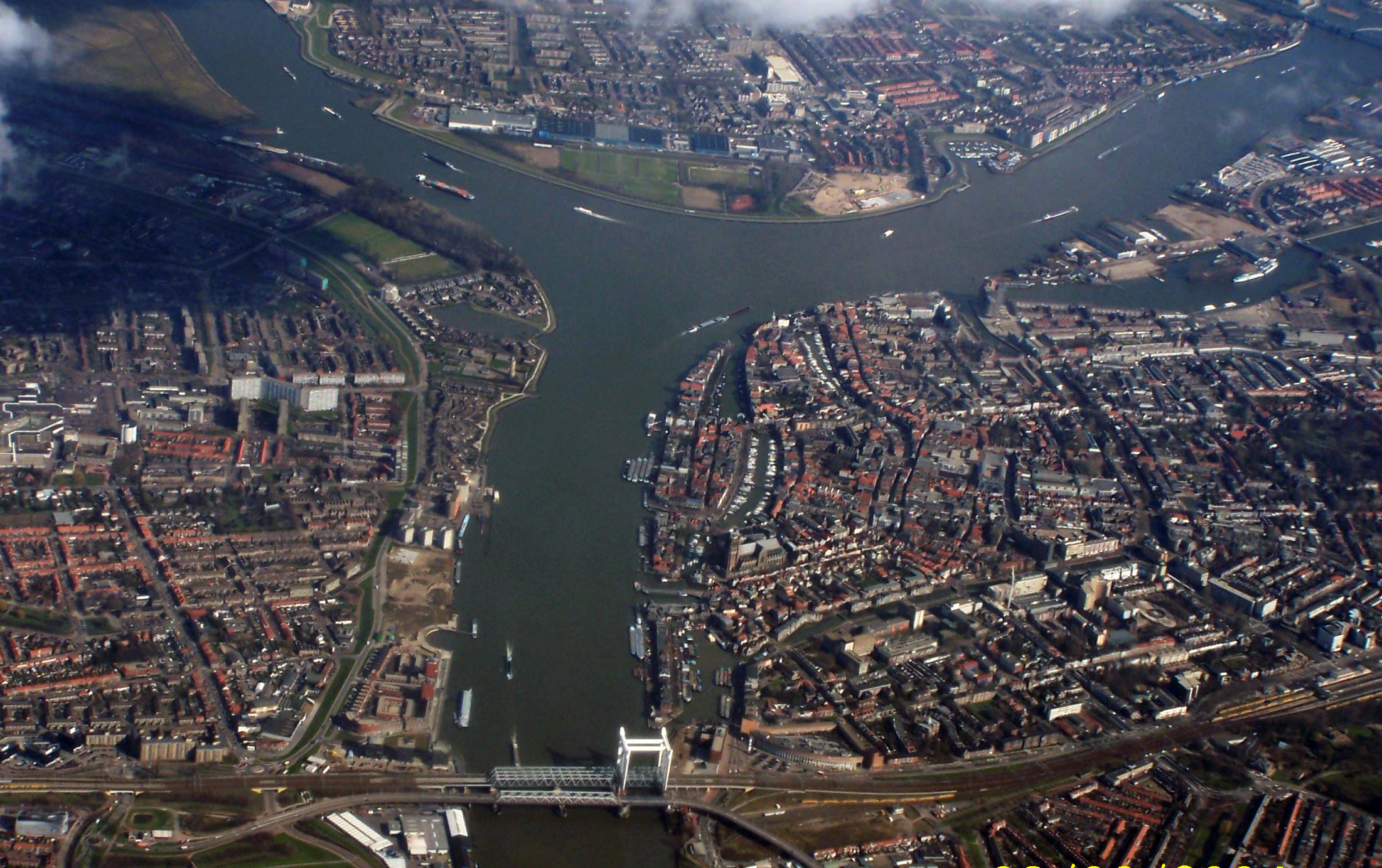
Three Drecht cities: Zwijndrecht (left), Papendrecht (top), and Dordrecht (right).

The Drechtsteden (Dutch pronunciation: [ˈdrɛxtsteːdə(n)]; Dutch for "Drecht cities") are a number of towns and cities bordering each other in the delta area of the rivers Oude Maas, Noord, and Beneden-Merwede in the province of South Holland, Netherlands. These cooperate in the Gemeenschappelijke Regeling Drechtsteden ("joint arrangement Drechtsteden"), which performs common tasks for the municipalities in the field of economy, development, culture, and social assistance. Collectively, a little more than 250,000 people call one of the towns and cities of Drechtsteden home.

The associated towns and cities are:

- Alblasserdam
- Dordrecht
- Hendrik-Ido-Ambacht
- Papendrecht
- Sliedrecht
- Hardinxveld-Giessendam
- Zwijndrecht

The name "Drechtsteden" was chosen because the name of several of the associated cities and towns ends in the suffix -drecht (meaning: place where ships are pulled or carried across the land). It is also an informal name for the area.
