= Kijfhoek (village) =

- Buurtschap
- Coat of arms
- Interactive map of Kijfhoek
- Coordinates: 51°49′32″N 4°35′32″E
- Country: Netherlands
- Province: South Holland
- Municipality: Zwijndrecht

Kijfhoek is a small village in the Dutch province of South Holland. It is located about 4 km west of the town of Zwijndrecht.

Kijfhoek was a separate municipality between 1817 and 1857, when it merged with Groote Lindt.

North of Kijfhoek lies one of the largest railway yards of the Netherlands.
