= Leigh Blond =

- Born: Bert de Ruijter; 1952 (age 73–74); Hardinxveld
- Genres: Blues, rock
- Instruments: Guitars, piano, drums, harmonica
- Years active: 1970–present
- Labels: Sony Music, RM Records, Munich Records, Delicious Records, DMI Music, Texas Publishing, Polydor
- Website: leighblond.com

Bert de Ruijter (born 1952) known as Leigh Blond, is a Dutch composer, singer and songwriter.

== Career ==
He was born to musically gifted parents in a shipyard town called Hardinxveld. At young age Blond was exposed to the jukebox music of Elvis Presley, Chuck Berry and the Shadows. A little later there were John Mayall, Eric Clapton, Peter Green, Jeff Beck, Champion Jack Dupree, Otis Spann, and Cuby + Blizzards. He learned to play the drum kit, guitar, piano and harmonica. The first bands were formed and his first self-written songs took place around his 17th birthday.

1969 took him to London to listen to blues music in the Marquee Club. Blond met with Long John Baldry, Christine Perfect, Chris Farlowe and several other British musicians and played with them randomly for a while as a guest guitarist and pianist. Writing his own songs, Blond started to record them in the late 1970s and 1980s. Two EP/LPs came out under his own label, Keys and River of Tears.

In 1990 a project was initiated that included the making of a CD together with Eelco Gelling, Kaz Lux, Herman Deinum and Hans laFaille. The first Leigh Blond CD was released named Bluesness on the Munich Record label.

The second album, See Me Thru (1996/1999) was recorded in England with Gerry Rafferty producer Hugh Murphy. Chris Farlowe, Pavel Rosak and Bryn Haworth contributed on the record. The title song became a top ten hit in several countries in the world with the aid of Sony Music. A tour was organized to promote See Me Thru with a band including Chris Farlowe, Eelco Gelling, Herman Deinum, Hans laFaille, Pavel Rosak, Kim Snelten, Arjan de Swart and Leigh Blond.

In 2004, the album Tribute To PCL came out. This was followed in 2006 by Blueside of the Road, Subtle Ways of Blues (2012) and Dignity (2017). All releases contain songs written by Leigh Blond, who also produced Blueside of the Road, Subtle Ways of Blues and Dignity.

Chris Farlowe and a dozen other musicians recorded Leigh Blond songs between 1985 and today. Half of these covered songs have been copyrighted under other aliases of Blond.

== Discography ==
- River of Tears (1982)
- Bluesness (1992)
- See Me Thru (1999)
- Tribute To PCL (2004)
- Blueside of the Road (2006)
- Subtle Ways of Blues (2012)
- Dignity (2017)
- Innocence (2022)
