= Kijfhoek classification yard =

Hump yard type freight rail yard between Rotterdam and Dordrecht, the Netherlands

Coordinates: 51°49′53″N 004°35′56″E

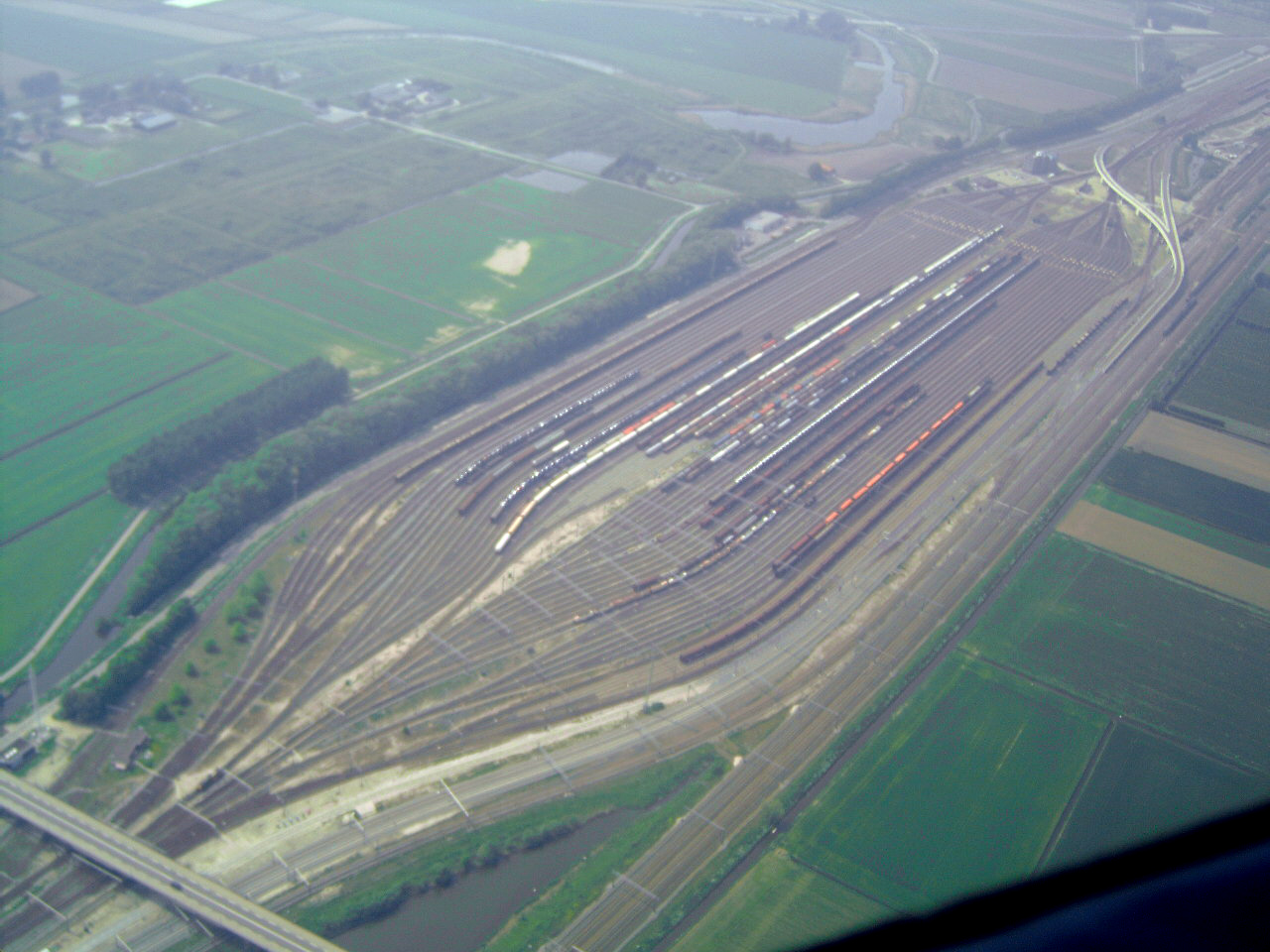
View at Kijfhoek

Kijfhoek classification yard is a hump yard type freight rail yard between Rotterdam and Dordrecht in the Western Netherlands. The rail yard is named after the nearby village of Kijfhoek in the municipality of Zwijndrecht. With an area of 50 hectares Kijfhoek is the largest of the few railway yards left in the country. The rail yard has a key function in connecting the rail network at the Port of Rotterdam with the rest of the Netherlands, Belgium and Germany.

== Layout ==
Heart of the yard is the classification bowl with 42 tracks. On each side of the classification tracks are 5 departure tracks. On the west side of the hump are 14 arrival tracks. The passenger line Rotterdam-Dordrecht and the Betuweroute, a double track freight railway from the Europoort to Germany, run north of the yard.

== Betuweroute ==
After the realisation of the Betuweroute in 2007, Kijfhoek gained importance in freight transport from the Europoort to Germany by rail. The arrival and departure tracks are connected to the Betuweroute through fly-overs over the passenger lines. All train movements at Kijfhoek and the Betuweroute are coordinated by the ProRail control centre at the rail yard.

== See also ==
- List of rail yards
- Rail transport in the Netherlands
