= Heerjansdam =

Town in South Holland, Netherlands

Coordinates: 51°50′N 4°34′E

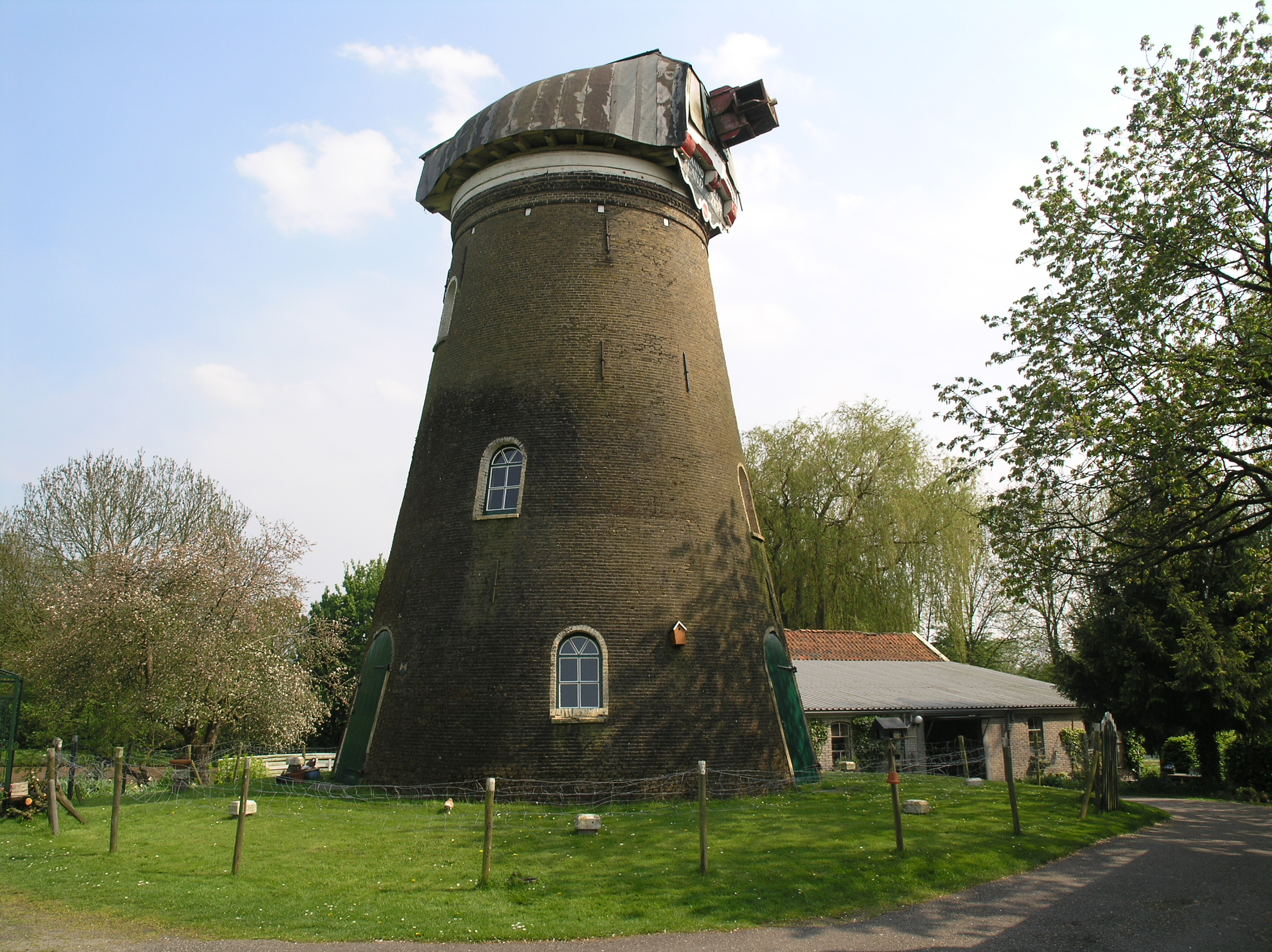
Heerjansdam

Heerjansdam (Dutch pronunciation: [ˌɦeːrjɑnzˈdɑm]) is a village in the western Netherlands, in the municipality of Zwijndrecht, South Holland. It has a population of 3,590.

== History ==
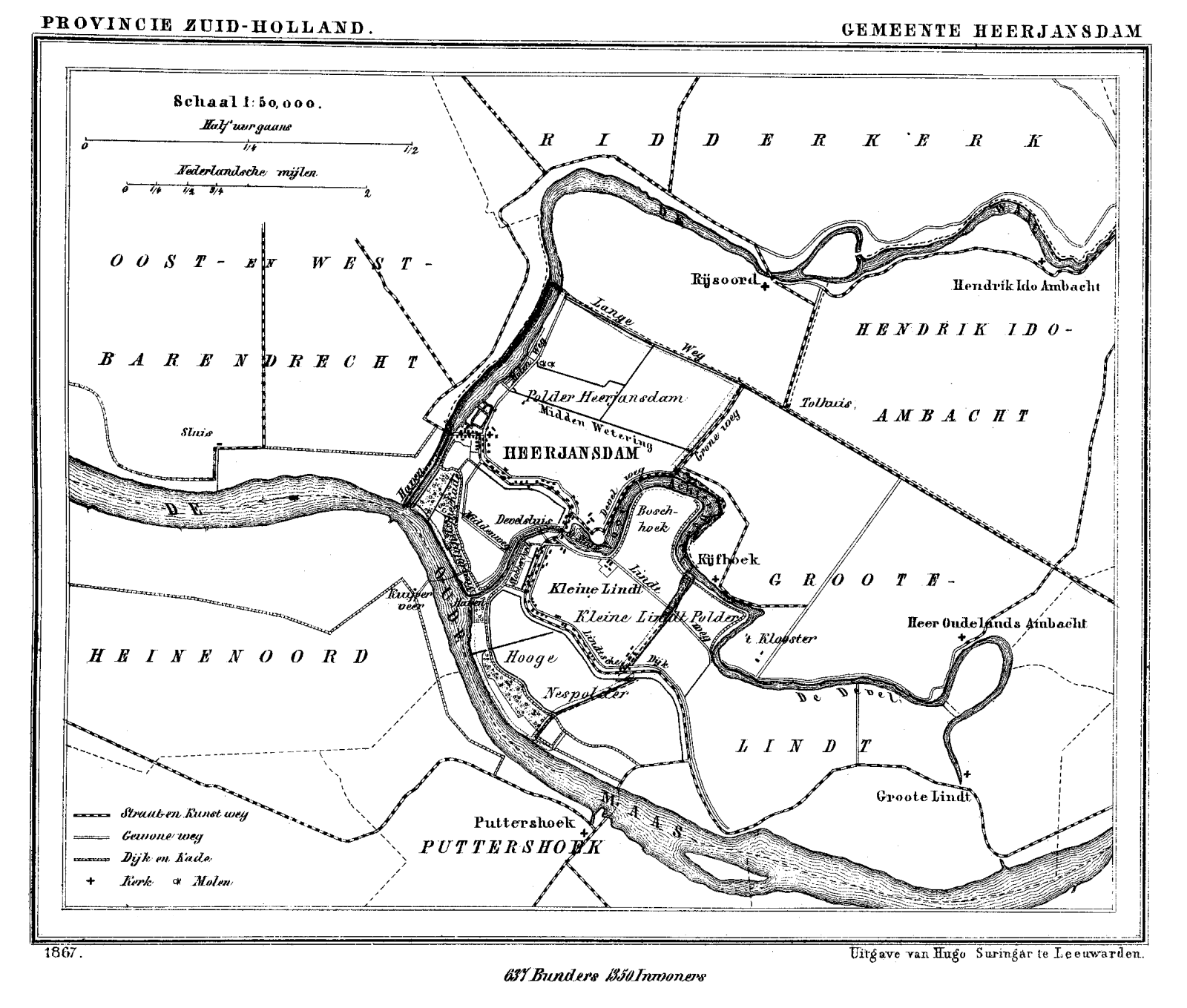
Heerjansdam in 1867.

It was originally called "Heren Heyenland", a name which first appeared in a document from 1323. In 1331, Hendrik of Brederode started to build dikes around the Zwijndrechtse Waard. This project was financed by eight other persons, including Jan of Rosendaele, who subsequently were made landlords of the Waard. On November 25, 1368, Jan of Rosendaele renamed it to Heerjansdam (Dutch for "Lord John's dam"), after the dam on the Waaltje.

In 2003 the municipality of Heerjansdam merged into Zwijndrecht.

== Notable people born in Heerjansdam ==
- Pieter Beelaerts van Blokland (born 1932), Queen's Commissioner
- Meindert Leerling (1936–2021), journalist and politician
- Johan Simons (born 1946), theater director
