= Noordeloos =

- Town
- Flag Coat of arms

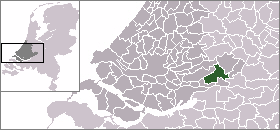

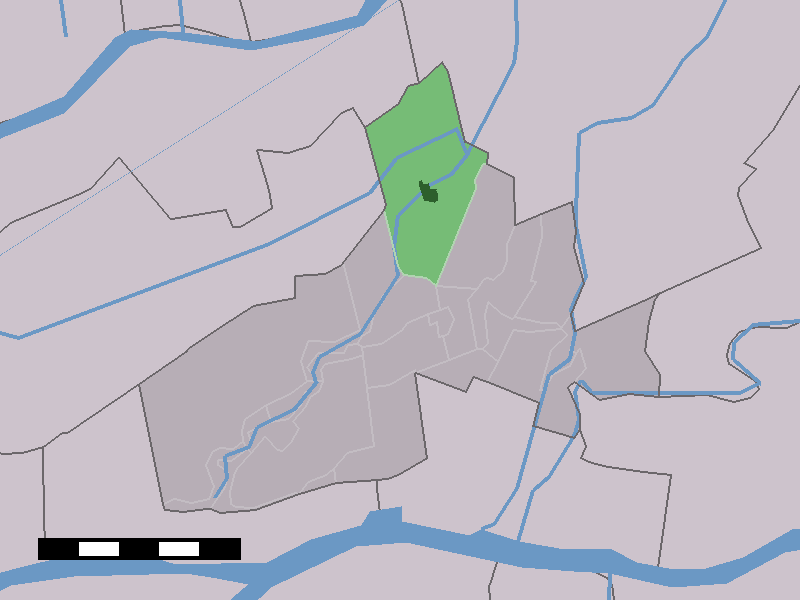
- The town centre (dark green) and the statistical district (light green) of Noordeloos in the municipality of Giessenlanden.
- Coordinates: 51°54′15″N 4°56′30″E
- Country: Netherlands
- Province: South Holland
- Municipality: Molenlanden

Population (2013)
  - Total: 1,816
- Time zone: UTC+1 (CET)
  - Summer (DST): UTC+2 (CEST)

Noordeloos is a town in the Dutch province of South Holland. It is a part of the municipality of Molenlanden, and lies about 8 kilometres (5.0 mi) north of Gorinchem.

In 2025, the town of Noordeloos had 1820 inhabitants. The built-up area of the town was 0.14 km^{2}, and contained 300 residences. The statistical area "Noordeloos", which also can include the peripheral parts of the village, as well as the surrounding countryside, has a population of around 370.

Noordeloos was a separate municipality until 1986 when it became part of Giessenlanden.

Noordeloos is also the name of a small community in Ottawa County, Michigan. It was created in the mid-1800s by Dutch settlers (who, at the time were also settling in nearby Holland and Zeeland) and was named after the original Dutch town.

In a book called The Shortest History of Migration, the economist Ian Goldin explains the concept of chain migration or network migration by noting that 90% of Dutch migrants from South Holland to the United States settled in three American towns, one of which was Noordeloos's namesake in Michigan.

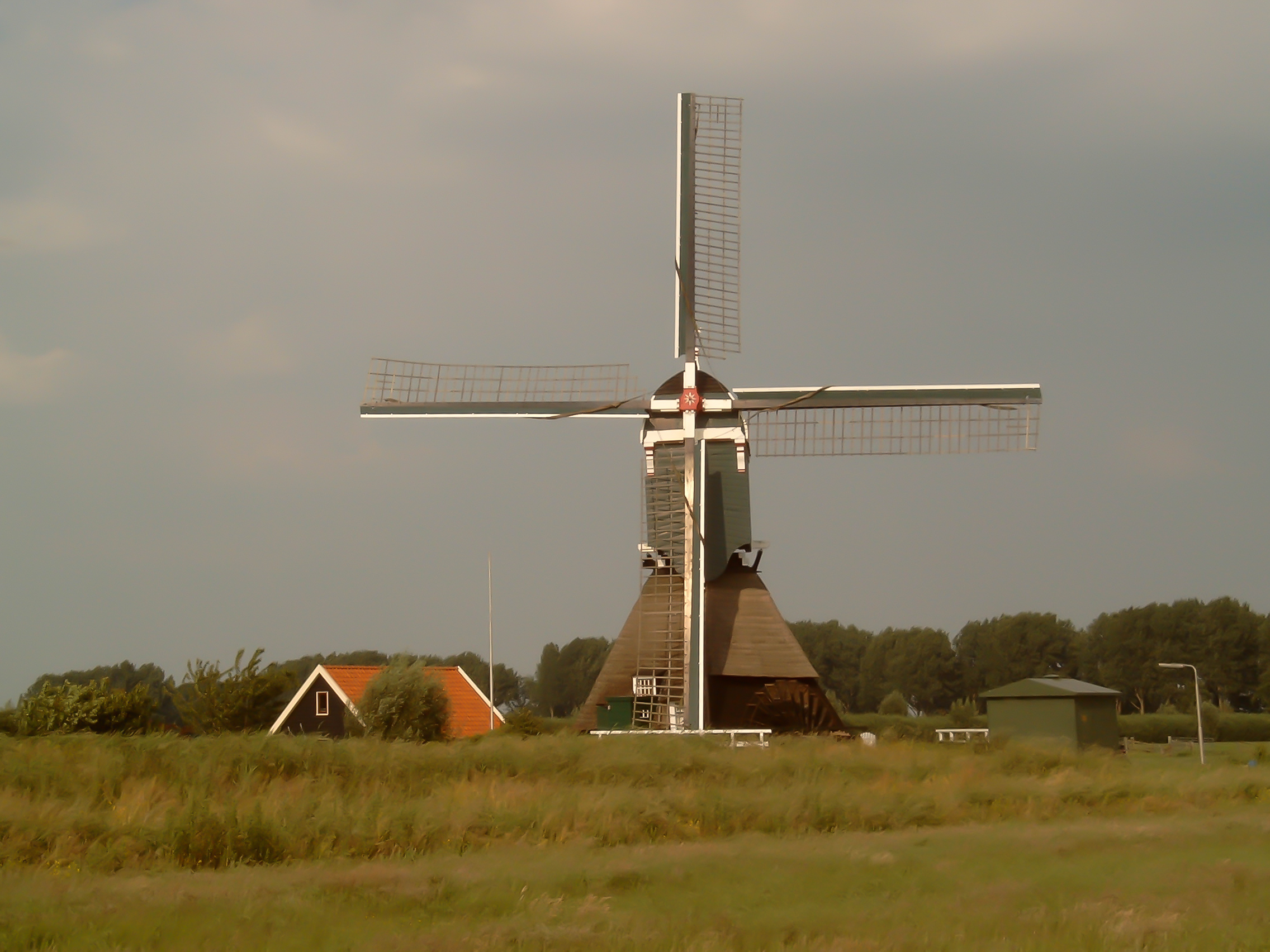
Noordeloos, windmill: Boterslootse molen

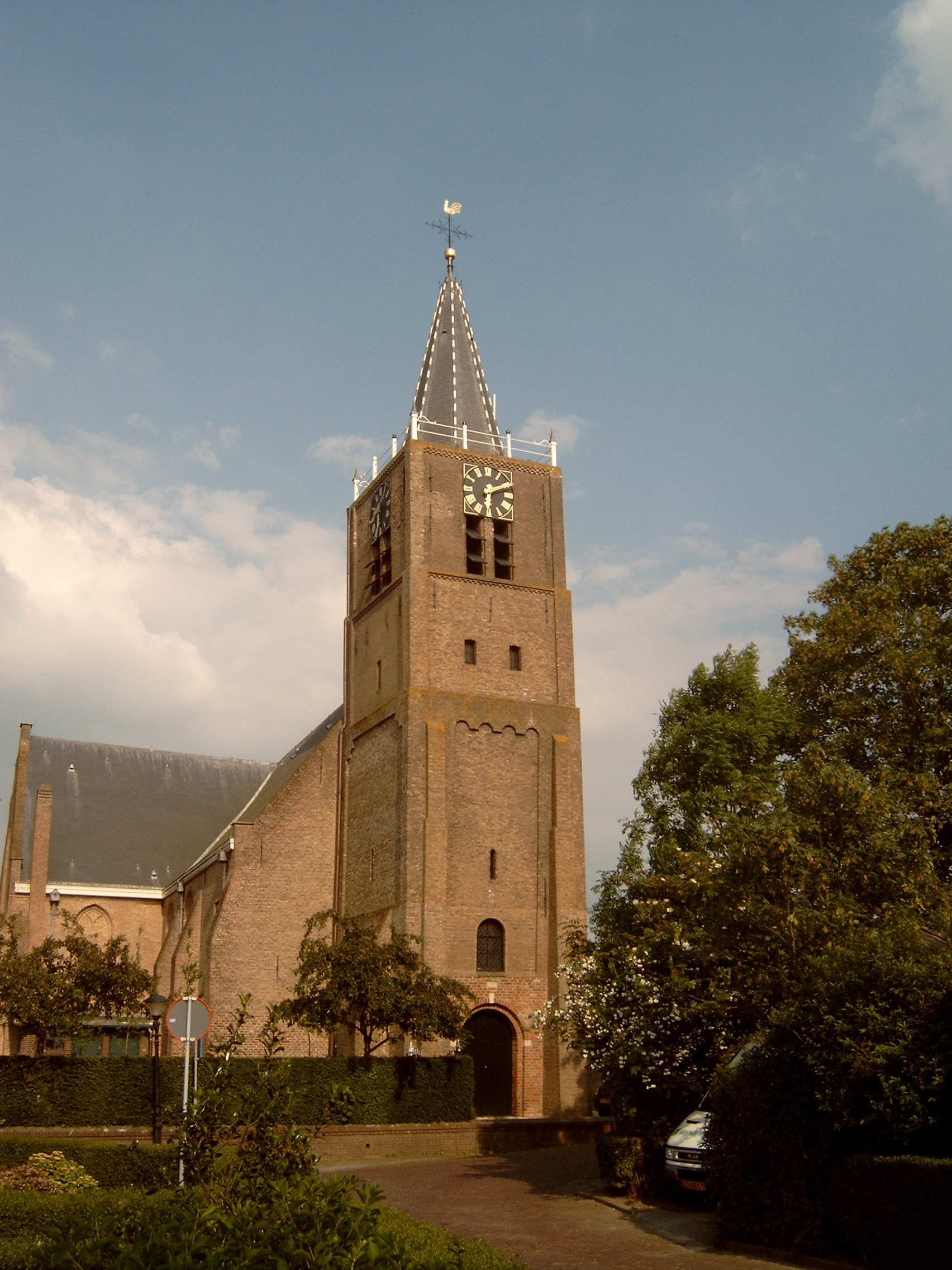
Noordeloos, church

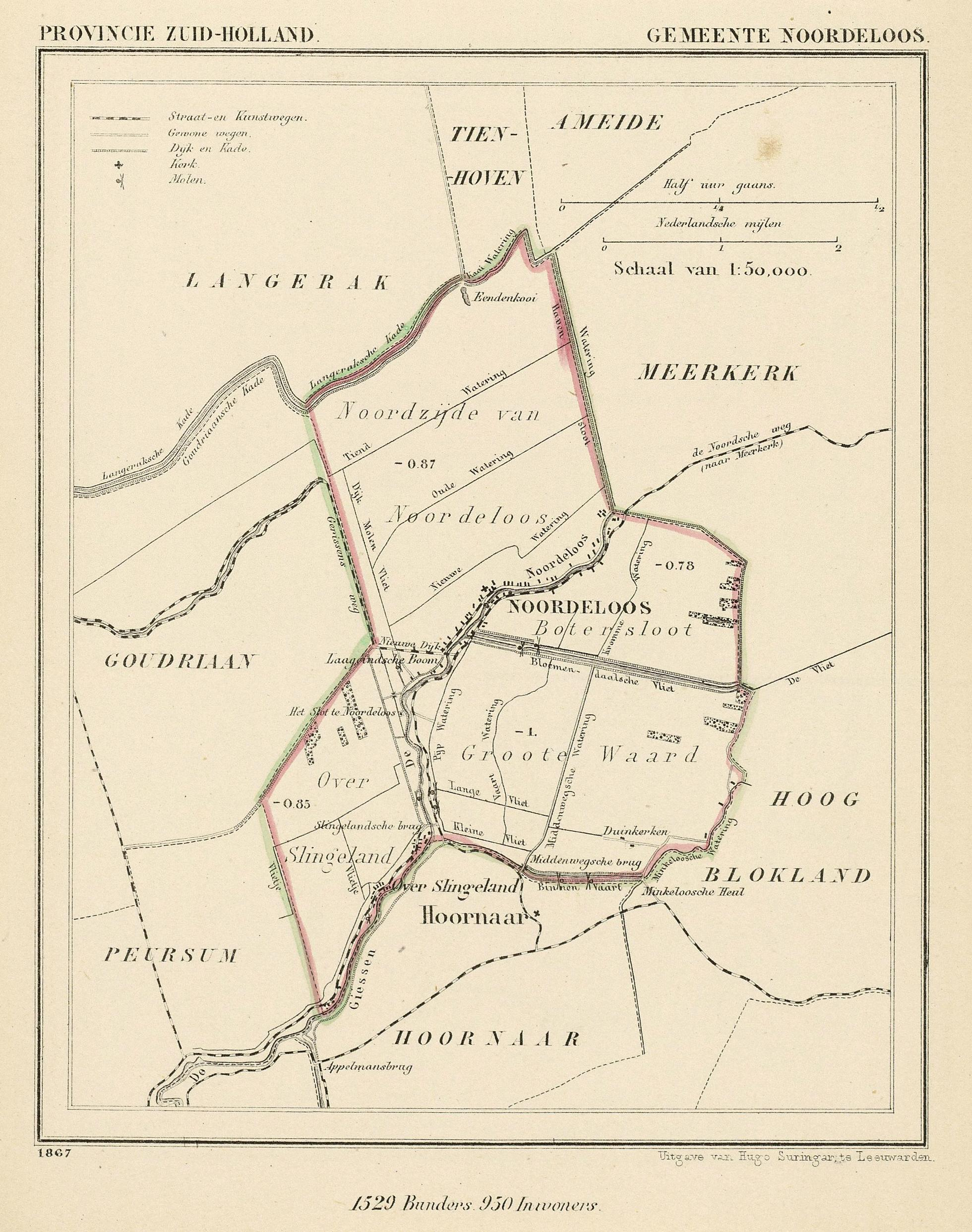
Map of the former municipality of Noordeloos in 1867
