= Zwijndrecht, Netherlands =

Zwijndrecht
- Municipality
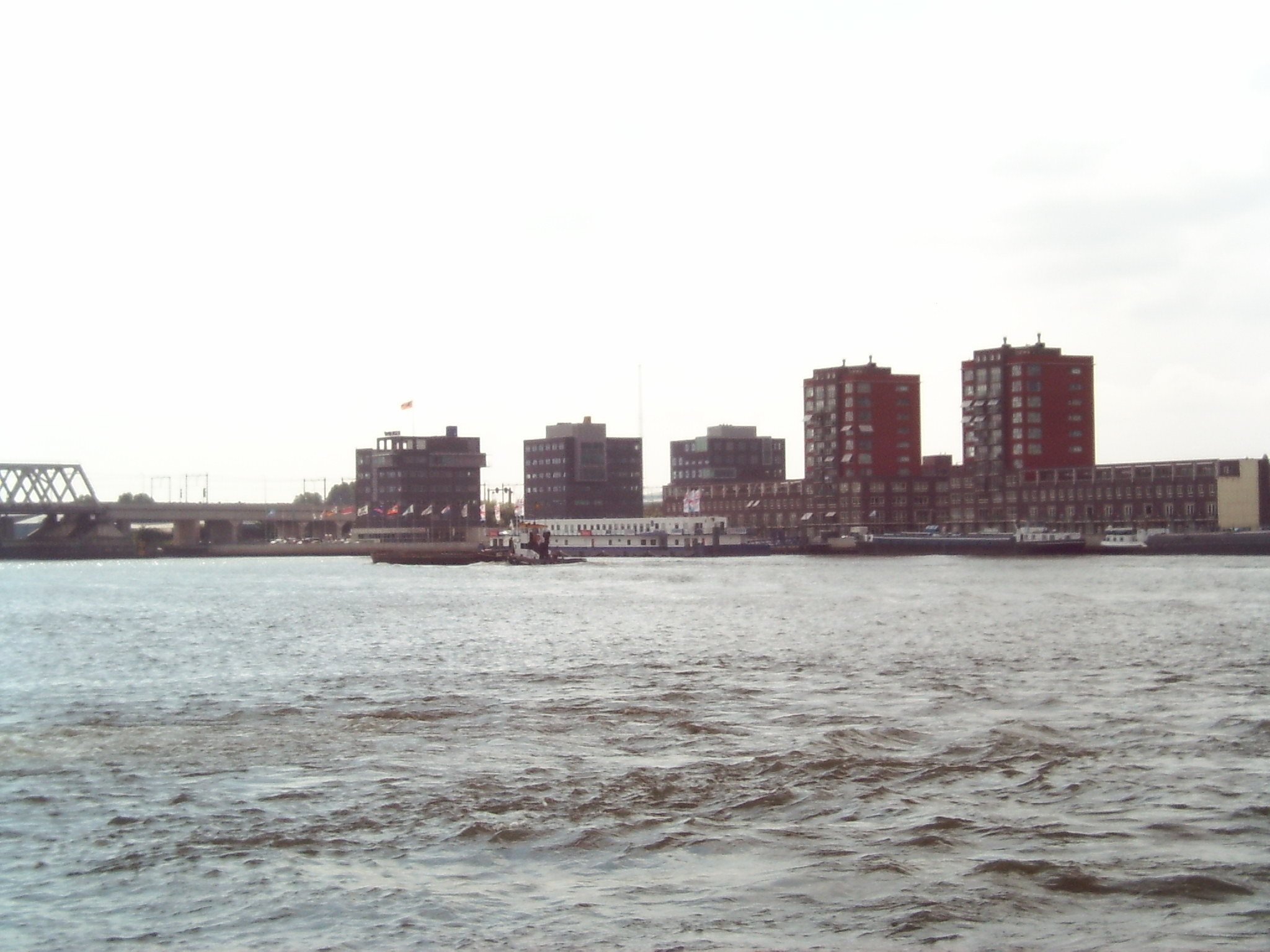
- Zwijndrecht across the Oude Maas

- Flag Coat of arms

- Location in South Holland
- Coordinates: 51°49′N 4°39′E
- Country: Netherlands
- Province: South Holland

Government
  - Body: Municipal council
  - Mayor: Dominic Schrijer (PvdA)

Area
  - Total: 22.77 km^{2} (8.79 sq mi)
  - Land: 20.30 km^{2} (7.84 sq mi)
  - Water: 2.47 km^{2} (0.95 sq mi)
- Elevation: −1 m (−3.3 ft)

Population (January 2021)
  - Total: 44,775
  - Density: 2,206/km^{2} (5,710/sq mi)
- Demonym: Zwijndrechter
- Time zone: UTC+1 (CET)
  - Summer (DST): UTC+2 (CEST)
- Postcode: 3330–3336
- Area code: 078
- Website: www.zwijndrecht.nl

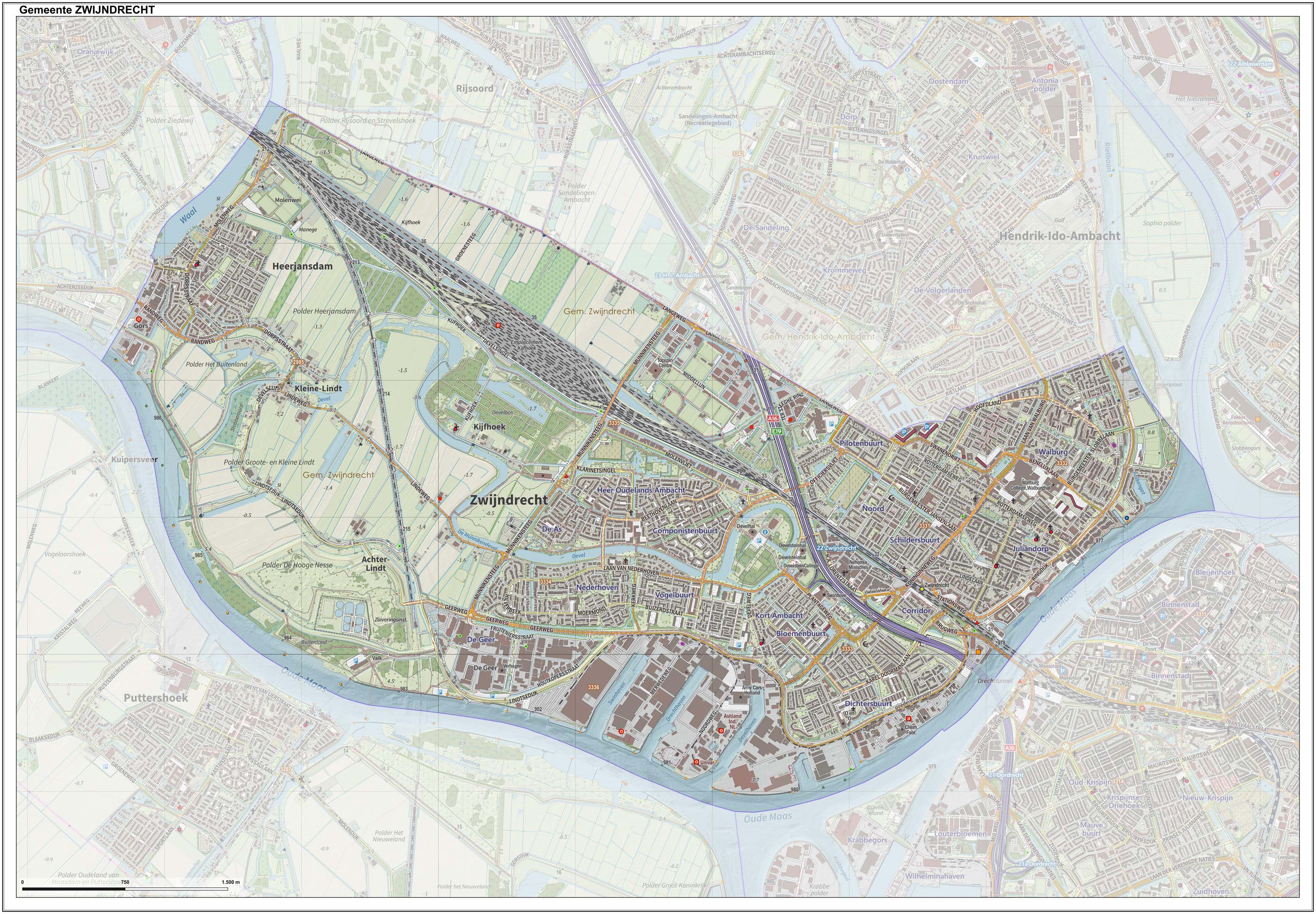
Topographic map of Zwijndrecht, September 2014

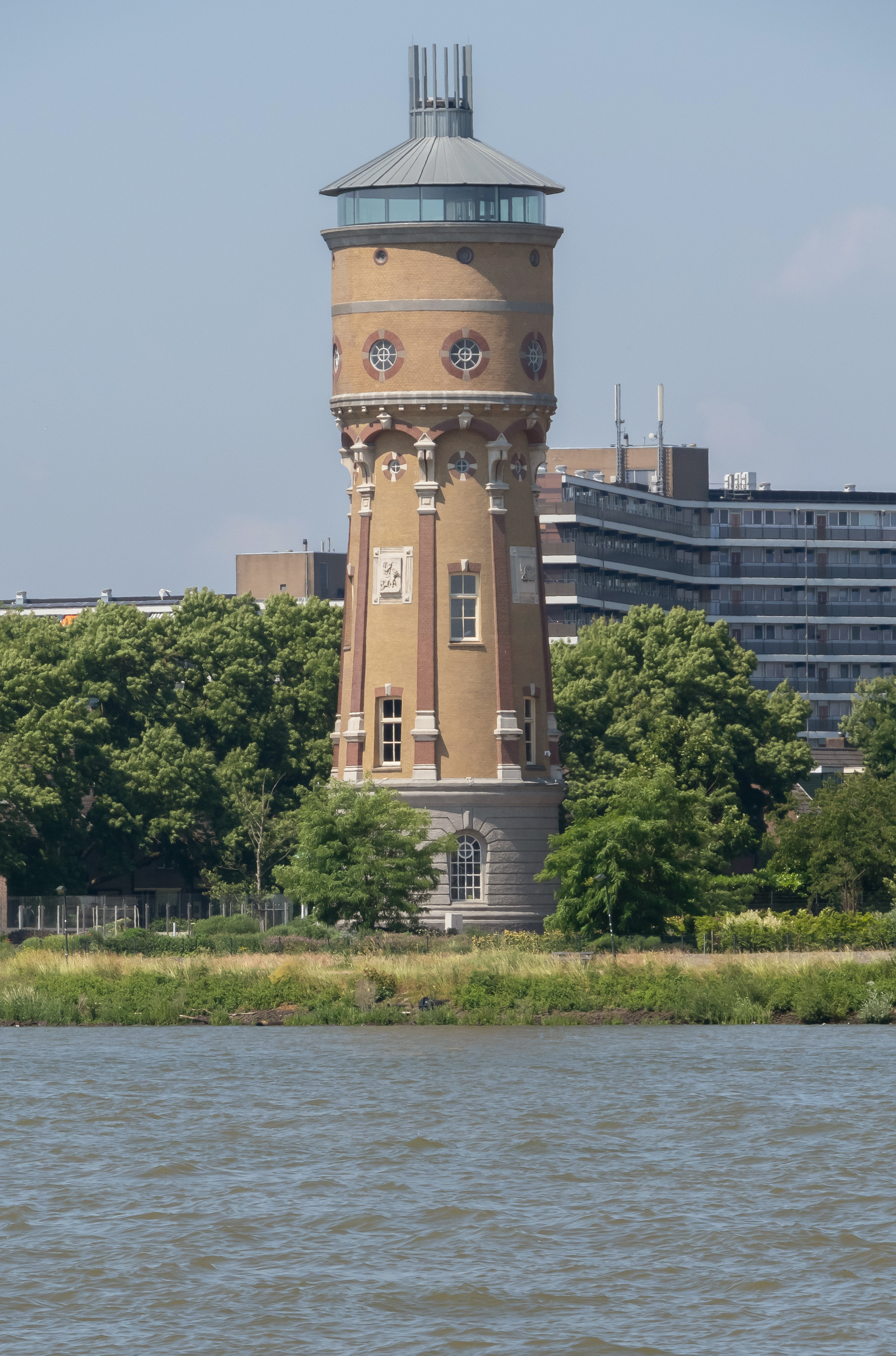
Watertower from Dordrecht

Zwijndrecht (Dutch pronunciation: [ˈzʋɛindrɛxt]) is a town and municipality in the western Netherlands. It is in the province of South Holland, at the southern tip of the island of IJsselmonde, and at the confluence of the rivers Oude Maas, Beneden-Merwede, and Noord.

== Population ==
The town of Zwijndrecht is one of the "Drecht" cities. Part of the suburban zone south of Rotterdam, it has grown from around 6,000 inhabitants in 1960, to about 45,000 today.

Since 2003, the municipality of Zwijndrecht also includes the villages of Heerjansdam and Kleine-Lindt. It had a population of 44,775 in 2021.

Zwijndrecht has the highest concentration of Estonians in the Netherlands.

The Evangelical Theological Academy is located here.

== History ==
Zwijndrecht developed in the Middle Ages, presumably close to a shallow area of the Oude Maas allowing people to walk over from Dordrecht. Soon Zwijndrecht was profiting from Dordrecht's economic influence this was the economic heart of the Netherlands in the 1450s. Important to the development of Zwijndrecht was the water around the city, across the Middle Ages most citizens lived from fish caught in the nearby rivers.

From the 17th century Zwijndrecht was renowned for their horticulture products, some of which was even being exported to England or Germany. The Zwijndrechtse vegetable auction next to their railroad was one of the largest in the country.

Later in the 19th century Zwijndrecht transformed into an industrial town containing glass factories, soap factories and shipyards. Other products like beer, rice and chocolate were also being produced.

In 2003 the small village Heerjansdam was included into the municipality of Zwijndrecht upping their population to around 45,000.

== Transportation ==
The town is served by a railway station of the same name (Station Zwijndrecht).

By train you go north to Rotterdam and The Hague, and south it takes you to either Breda or Roosendaal.

Water bus routes 21 and 24 both stop at (Zwijndrecht Veerplein), connecting it with the following:

- Dordrecht Merwekade
- Dordrecht Hooikade

The road buses are operated by Qbuzz. Routes connect to Dordrecht, Rotterdam and other places in the Drechtsteden.

Zwijndrecht serves as a regional freight transport hub due to its location at the intersection of the A16 motorway and the Oude Maas river. The municipality also houses Kijfhoek, one of Europe's largest rail classification yards.

== Twin cities ==
Twin cities of Zwijndrecht
City	Country	Since
Norderstedt	Germany	1981
Poprad	Slovakia	2000
Zwijndrecht	Belgium	2004

== Notable people ==
- Peter van Dalen (born 1958) politician and Member of the European Parliament
- Mohammed Benzakour (born 1972) a Moroccan-Dutch columnist, essayist, poet, writer and politician
- Nicolay (born Matthijs Rook in 1974) electronica, R&B and hip hop record producer
- Ralph Barendse (born 1977) a DJ and producer of electronic dance music
- Martijn Lakemeier (born 1993) actor

=== Sport ===
- Michel Valke (born 1959) retired Dutch footballer
- Jeroen Sluijter (born 1975) baseball player
- Percy Isenia (born 1976) baseball player
- Kevin Vermeulen (born 1990) professional footballer
- Marten de Roon (born 1991) professional footballer
- Nikki de Roest (born 1993) educator and formerly a female association football player
- Jordy van Deelen (born 1993) footballer
- Rogier Dorsman (born 1999) blind paralympic swimmer

== Gallery ==
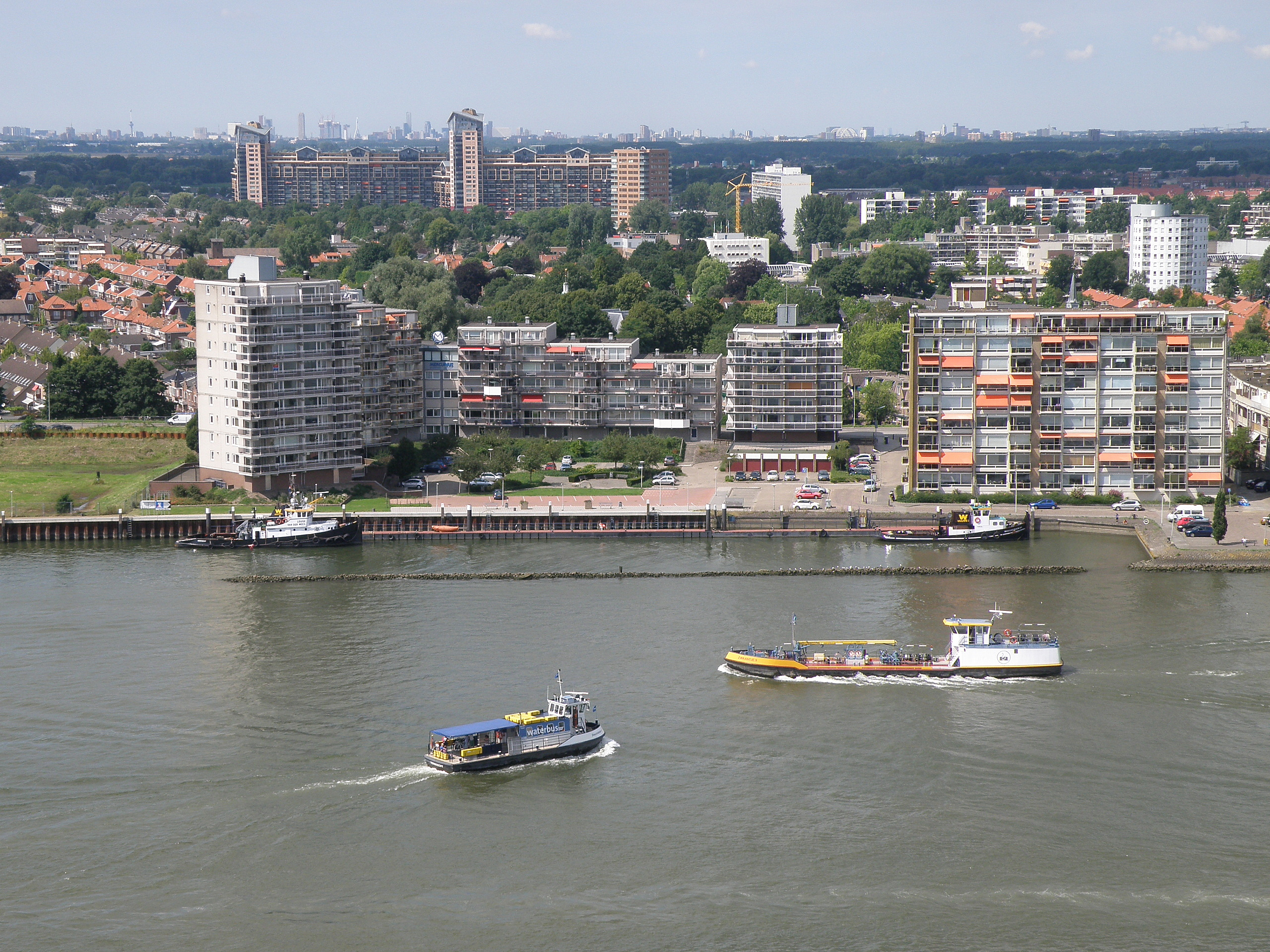
Zwijndrecht vanaf Grote Kerk

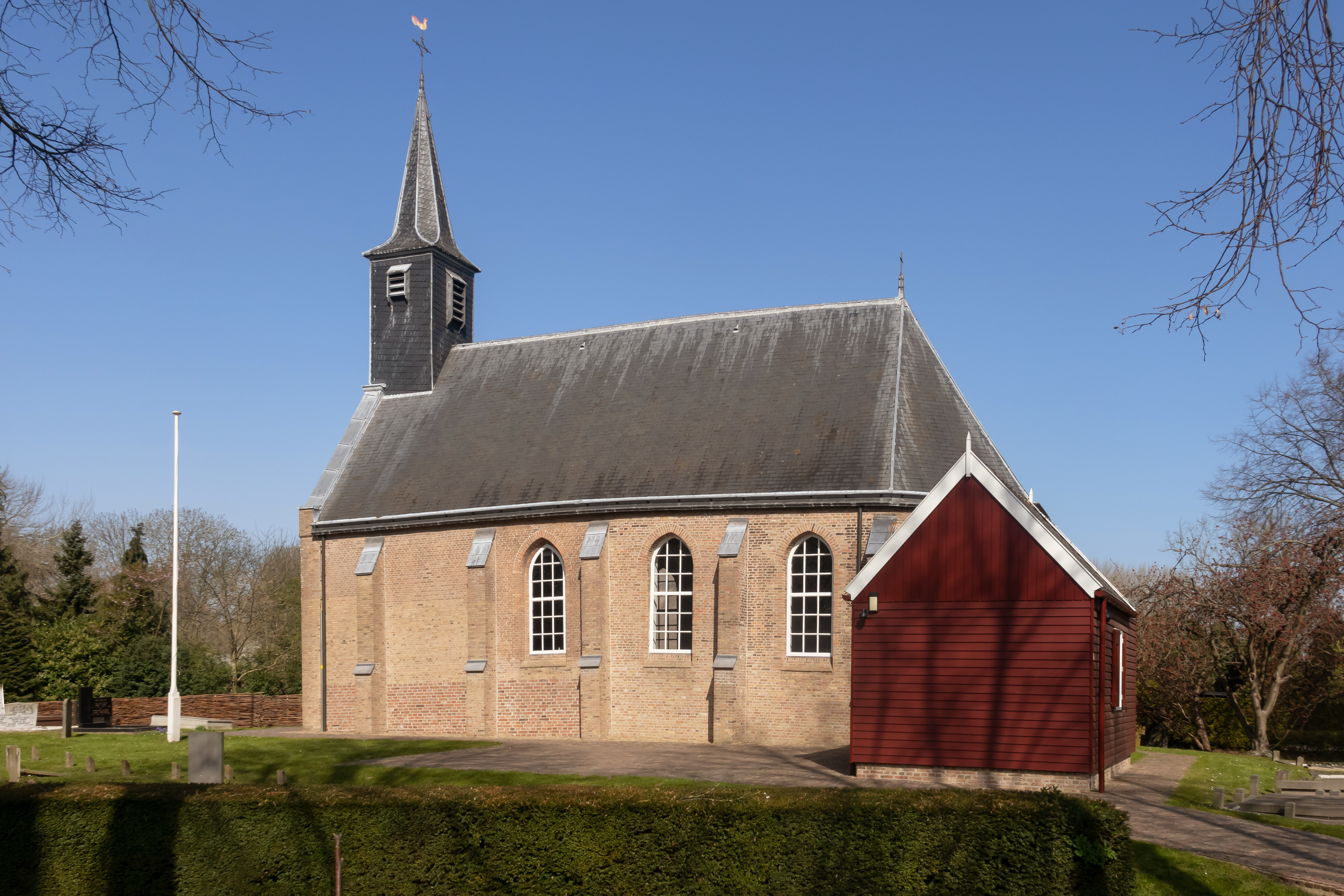
Church: the Pietermankerk

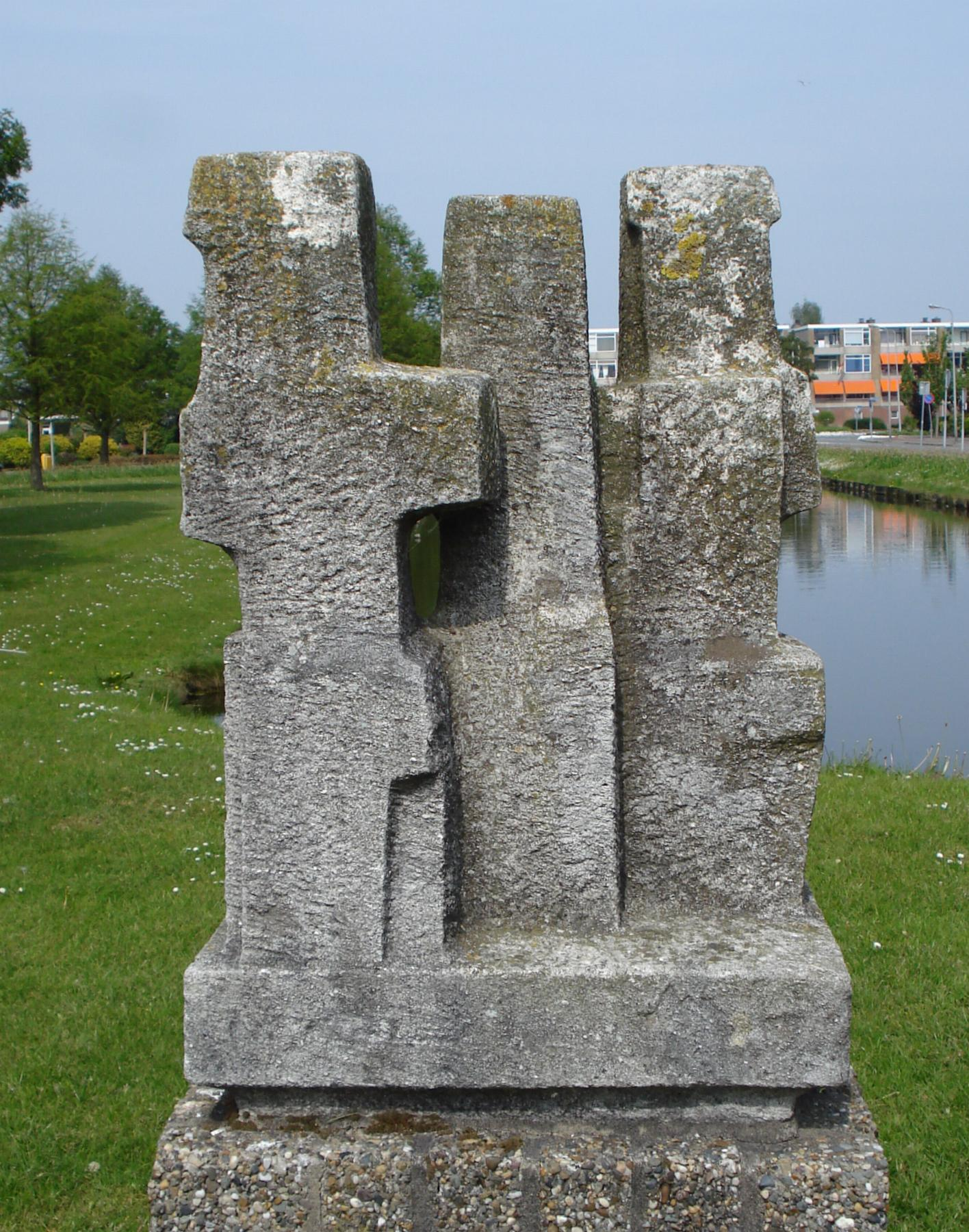
Zwijndrecht kunstwerk drie koningen

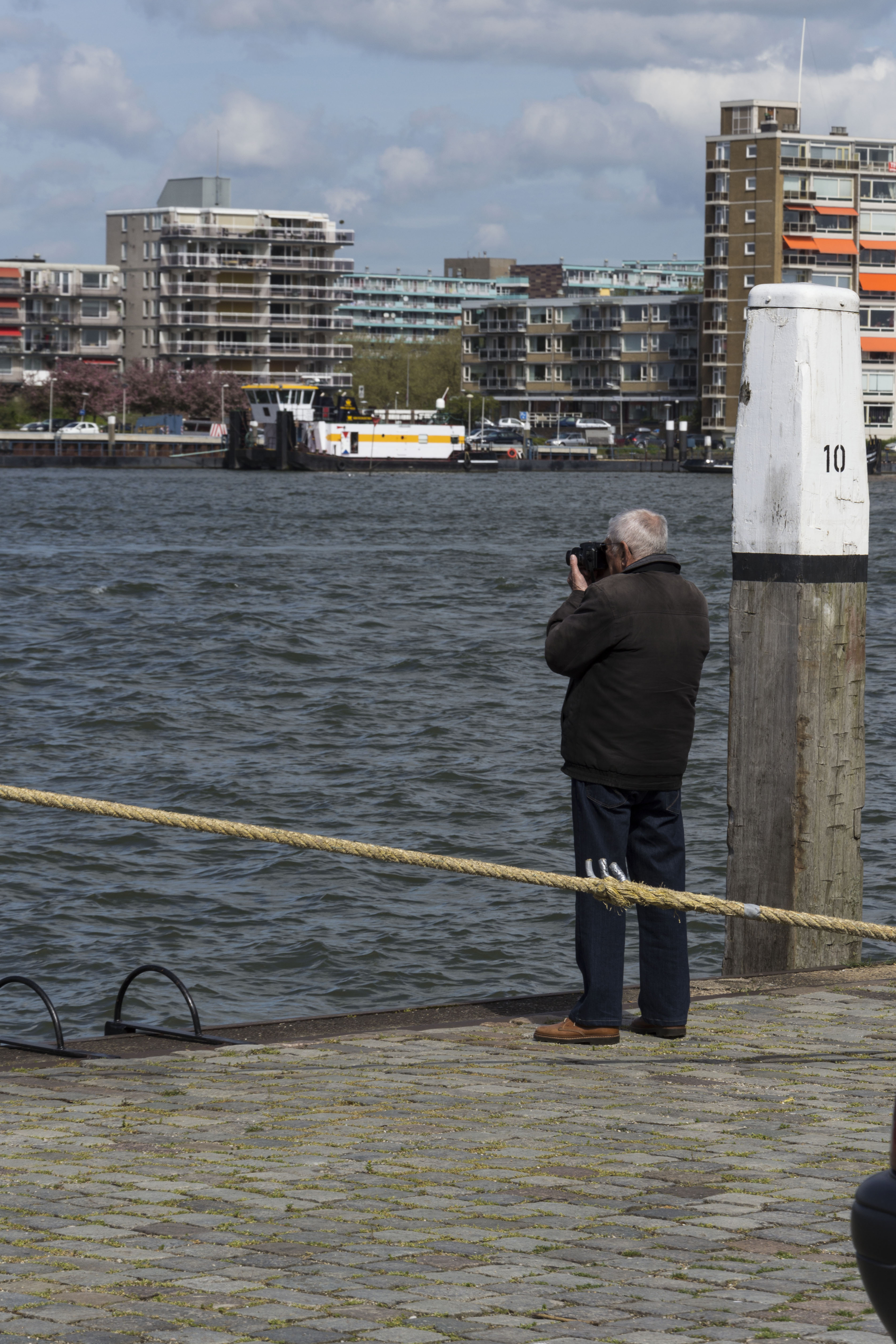
Watching Zwijndrecht

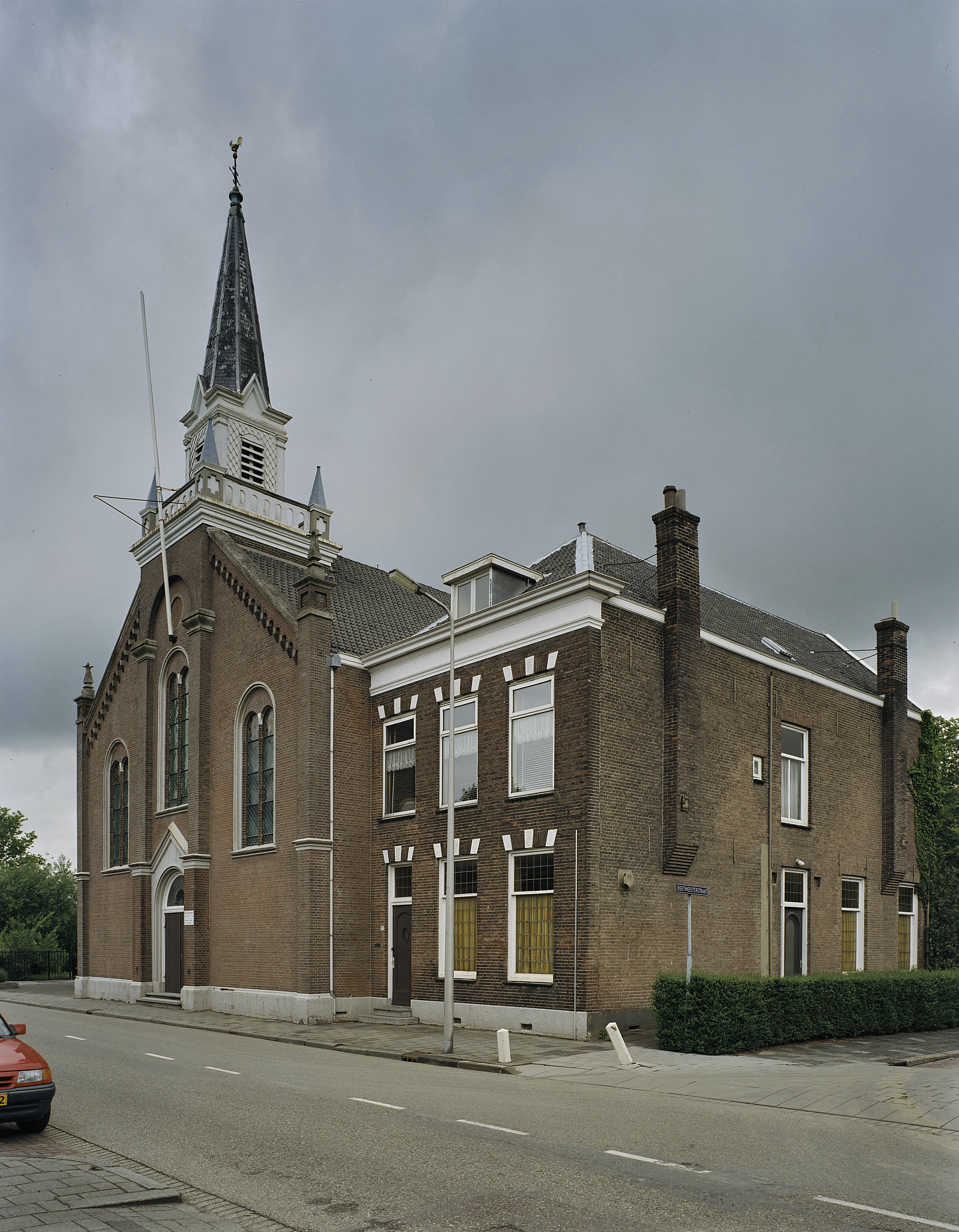
Bethelkerk - Zwijndrecht

== See also ==
- Meerdervoort
