= Military history of the Netherlands during World War II =

The Netherlands entered World War II on May 10, 1940, when invading German forces quickly overran the country. On December 7, 1941, after the attack on Pearl Harbor, the Netherlands government in exile also declared war on Japan. Operation Market Garden, which started in 1944, liberated the southern and eastern parts of the country, but full liberation did not come until the surrender of Germany on May 5, 1945.

== Invasion ==
=== Prelude ===
When World War II erupted in September 1939, most in the Netherlands believed that the country could remain neutral, as it had in World War I. The months of "Phoney War" following the German invasion of Poland seemed to justify this attitude. The Royal Netherlands Army did immediately mobilize in 1939, but was not in full strength until April 1940.

Warning signs to the contrary went unheeded. Among them were some incidents, most notably the Venlo incident in which members of the German Abwehr operating in the Netherlands abducted two members of the British SIS and killed one Dutch intelligence officer. More direct were worrying signals from Berlin received by the government beginning in the first months of 1940. The Dutch military attaché there, Major Bert Sas, had established good relations with Colonel Hans Oster, who occupied a high position in the Abwehr. Oster warned Sas about German plans for an offensive against the Netherlands, Belgium and France, and Sas passed the warnings on. The government in the Netherlands, however, did not take them seriously, as the offensive was postponed several times, even though Oster did eventually offer the correct date of May 10, 1940.

=== Dutch defensive works ===
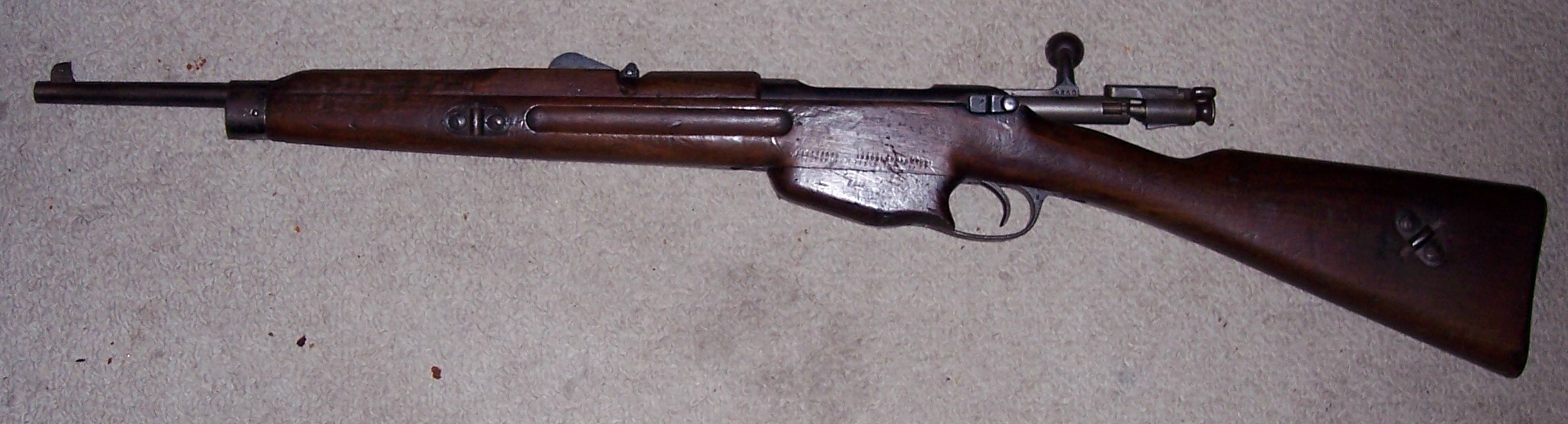
Left side view

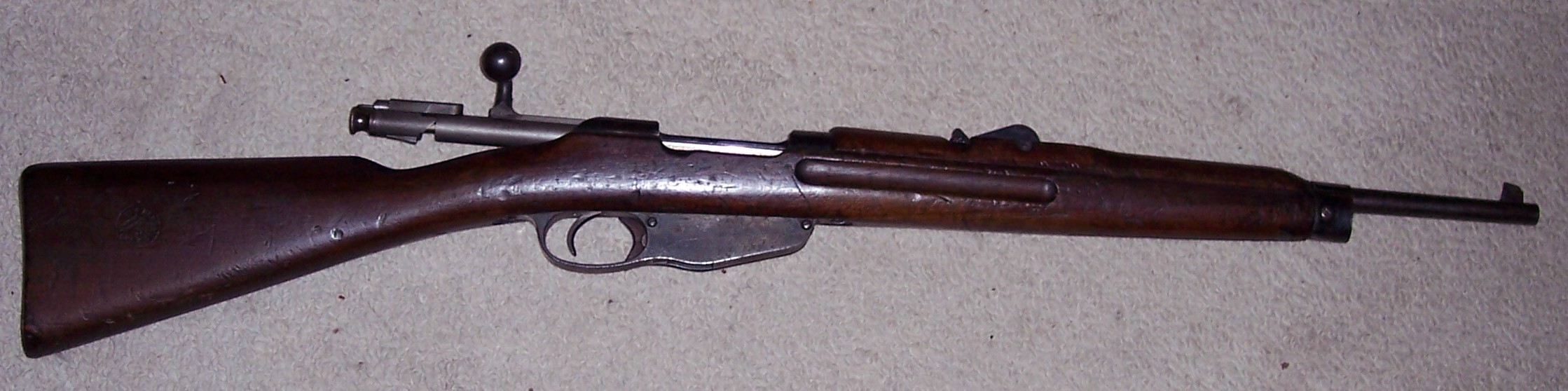
Right side view

Dutch Mannlicher carbine from the pre–World War II period

The Dutch army was not considered adequate even at the end of World War I, and it did not improve much during the interwar years. By the time of the German invasion in 1940, only about 166 battalions were operational for the defense of the Netherlands, and most were poorly prepared for combat. Only a few had modern weapons; the majority of soldiers carried carbines of 19th-century vintage, and most artillery was similarly outdated. The Dutch army also had little armor, and its air arm, the Luchtvaartafdeeling, had but a handful of reasonably modern aircraft, most notably the Fokker G.1 twin-engine fighter-bomber and the fixed-undercarriage Fokker D.XXI single-seat fighter, with which to face the Luftwaffe.

Reasons cited for the weakness of the Netherlands military include decay during the long lapse of time since its last active participation in a war, the 1873–1903 Aceh War; the effects of widespread pacifism during the 1920s and 1930s; budget cuts, particularly during the Great Depression; and the unrealistic belief by Dutch politicians that the League of Nations would offer sufficient protection from aggression. Certainly, the Dutch military faced an unfavorable political climate between the wars. For example, in 1925, when rebuilding the Dutch army into a modern fighting force would have required increased funding of 350 million guilders, the government instead cut the army's budget by 100 million guilders. A committee tasked with finding further cuts concluded that the army was already so weak that any reductions would endanger its sustainability; the government thereupon disbanded the committee and appointed a new, more aggressive one, which recommended cutting another 160 million guilders. Meanwhile, potential human capital was allowed to dissipate; compulsory service was cut back from 24 months to six, barely enough for the most basic of training.

Not until 1936 did the Dutch government recognize the growing threat of Nazi Germany, but the resultant budget increases were too small and too late to establish an effective defense of the country. One factor was decisive: by that time, many European countries were rearming and had already placed orders taxing the available capacity of munitions plants, hindering Dutch efforts at procurement. A second factor was continued economic pressure, as Defense Minister Adriaan Dijxhoorn refused to authorize funds for modernizing both main Dutch lines of defense against attack from the east, the Waterline and the Grebbe line. The failure of General Izaak H. Reijnders, leader of the Dutch General Staff, to obtain more funding for these lines led to his replacement on 6 February 1940, by General Henri Winkelman, who opted to concentrate on modernizing the Grebbeline, with its largely wooden bunkers, because German artillery brought up as deep within the country as the Waterline would be within range of Amsterdam. Modernization of the Grebbeline, however, would not be complete or effective by the time of the invasion, in part because the government balked at the expense of clearing forests and houses blocking lines of sight from many of the fortifications.

=== German preparations ===
For Germany, the Netherlands was only of secondary importance in the attack on France. Germany's main worry was the route through Limburg, to eliminate the delay caused by the Liege corridor, that had hindered German forces during World War I.

The aim of the German attack plan was to eliminate the country as soon as possible. The 18th Army and the 9th Panzer Division were allotted for this task.

The 18th Army was to attack the Netherlands above Roermond, most notably breaking through the eastern defences of Fortress Holland (after having forced the Grebbeline) and crossing the Afsluitdijk. The 9th Panzer Division was to move through the southern part of the Netherlands and attack the Moerdijk Bridge.

Furthermore, the 22nd Air Landing Division and the 7th Fliegerdivision were to land around The Hague, in order to capture Queen Wilhelmina, the Dutch government and the General Staff. They also were to capture the Moerdijk Bridge and the bridges over the Maas in Rotterdam so that the 9th Panzer Division could easily cross these.

In preparation for their attack, German officers had conducted extensive espionage research. The Dutch did not hinder them in this – indeed, a watchtower near the Grebbe Line was not closed because, as Prime Minister Dirk Jan de Geer said, "it would harm the Dutch economy." Although after mobilization the lines would be closed to the public, a lot of high-ranking officers from the German army, including a few colonels, were able to see the Dutch lines and write down where the bunkers were, so artillery could destroy them.

Based on these observations, the Germans thought they could capture the Netherlands in one to two days.

=== Campaign ===
In the first days of May 1940, the Dutch government received several indications of German activity near the border, and on May 7 all leave was cancelled and the army was put on alert. Finally, on May 10, 3:55, the German army invaded the Netherlands.

The rivers IJssel and Maas, running through the Netherlands from south to north, were the first obstacles that the Germans encountered. They had created special units to capture the bridges over these rivers (sometimes even clad in Dutch uniforms), but in all but a few places the Dutch defenders were able to demolish the bridges. The German advance was further hindered by a line of pillboxes along both rivers, but despite heavy resistance they succeeded in crossing both IJssel and Maas by midday.

In the meantime, the airborne forces had taken the Dutch by surprise. German paratroopers succeeded in taking the Moerdijk bridges, the traffic bridge near Dordrecht and partially the traffic bridge in Rotterdam. They also captured the airfields of Waalhaven (near Rotterdam), and Ypenburg, Ockenburg and Valkenburg (around The Hague). However, Dutch resistance was again heavier than expected and the Dutch succeeded in keeping the paratroopers out of The Hague itself. Indeed, by the evening, all three airfields around The Hague had been recaptured by the Dutch.

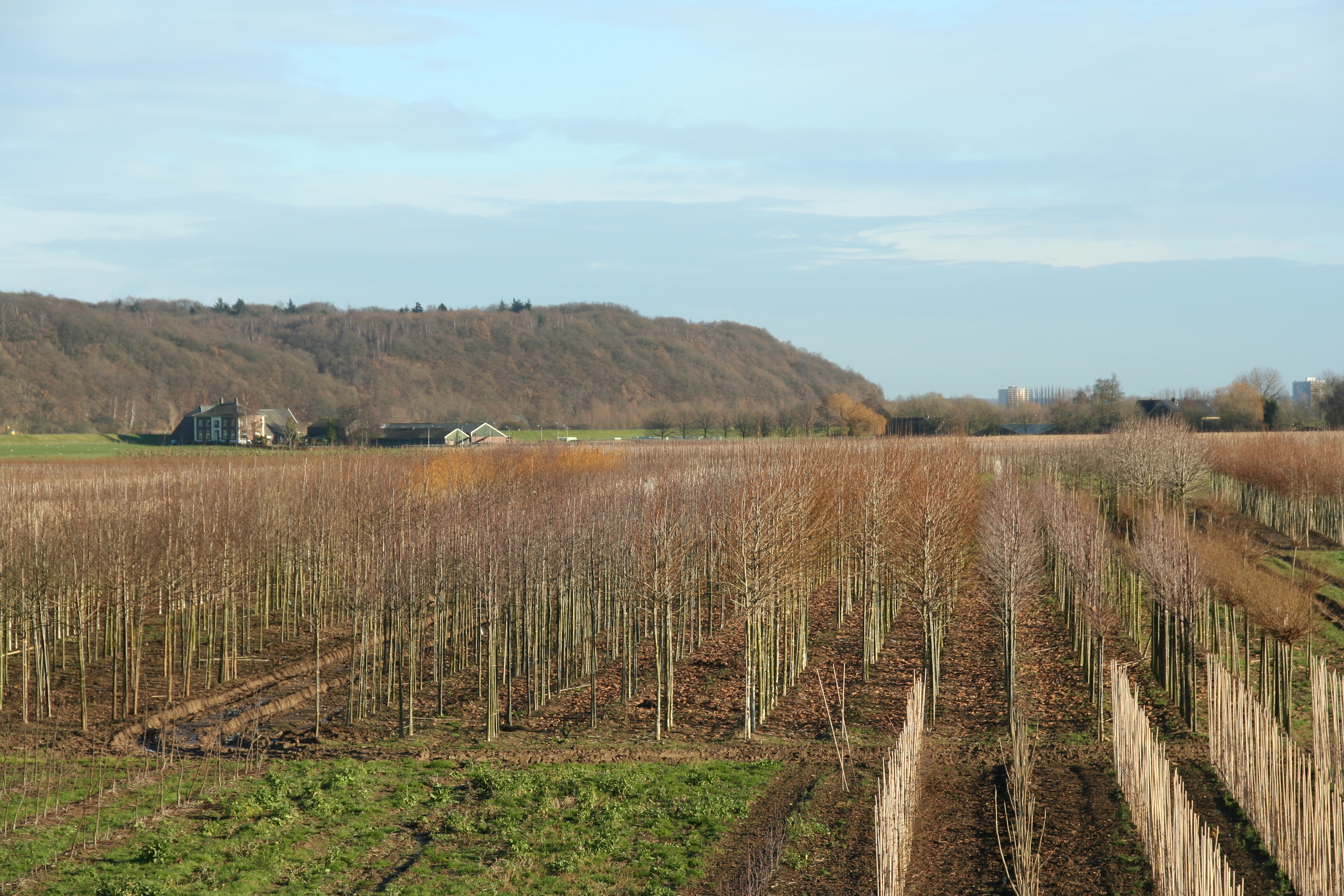
Grebbeberg

The next day, the attack on the Grebbe Line started. The Germans attacked its most southern point, the Grebbeberg, where there were no inundations. Instead, there was a front line of outposts, a main defense line and finally a stop line, from which possible breaches in the main line could be contained and repaired. After an artillery barrage, the SS regiment "Der Führer" attacked the outposts. Once again, despite stiff resistance, the Germans succeeded in capturing the northern part of the outpost line, after which they could easily outflank the southern part. However, it took them until 16:00 to capture all outposts.

By now, French reinforcements had started to arrive from the south. Because of miscommunications between the Dutch and the French, and also because the Moerdijk Bridge, the only link between the eastern and southern parts of the Netherlands, was still in German hands, their effectiveness was limited.

On May 12, the German 1st Cavalry Division tried to cross the Afsluitdijk. However, at Kornwerderzand, the Dutch had built modern concrete fortifications to protect the dam. Moreover, the dam offered no cover whatsoever and the attack was easily repulsed (with the help of a Dutch gunboat). The Germans would try again on May 13, but with no success. The Kornwerderzand fortification would hold out until the Dutch surrender.

On the same day, the Germans attacked the main defense line of the Grebbe Line. Sometimes using Dutch POWs as a shield (a war crime), by the end of the day they had captured this line as well. The Dutch tried to organize a counter-attack during the night, as they thought there were only some hundred German troops opposing them (the real number was probably somewhere around two thousand), but this met with little success. In places, they were even fired upon by other Dutch troops who had not been notified of the counter-attack.

Finally, on May 13, the 9th Panzer Division evaded the French and joined up with the paratroopers. However, they met with heavy resistance in Rotterdam, where their advance was stopped.

On the same day, the Germans mounted their final attack against the Grebbe Line. The stop line, the last resort of the Dutch defenders, collapsed and the Germans broke through. Isolated pockets of Dutch troops continued to resist, but a night attack to dislodge the Germans failed. As there were no reserve troops, it was clear that defeat was imminent: there was nothing between the Germans and the North Sea but the famous Waterlinie (Water Line) was only very sketchily prepared.

On May 14, the Dutch commander at Rotterdam, Colonel Scharroo, received an ultimatum: if he did not surrender, the town would be bombed. As the ultimatum was not signed, Scharroo sent it back. A few hours later, he received another ultimatum, this time duly signed by General Schmidt, the German commander at Rotterdam. Schmidt did not know that a squadron of bombers was already on its way to bomb Rotterdam. The Germans tried to warn the bomber crews by shooting red flares, but only half of the squadron noticed this; the other half continued on their mission and dropped their bombs on the city (see the Rotterdam Blitz).

Under the threat that other major cities like Amsterdam and Utrecht would share the fate of Rotterdam in which over 900 civilians were killed, the Dutch decided to surrender in the midday of 14 May. On May 15, in Rijsoord, General Winkelman signed the formal capitulation of the Netherlands, with the exception of the province of Zeeland, where the French still operated (Zeeland held out until 19 May, after the city of Middelburg was devasted by artillery). The Dutch colonies also continued the battle.

Casualties were high in the five day campaign: over 10,000 Dutch soldiers were killed, injured or declared missing.

==== Fighting on ====
Though the Netherlands was occupied, by no means was all lost. The colonies (most notably the Dutch East Indies) were still free, and Queen Wilhelmina and the Dutch government had left the Netherlands for London.

The Royal Netherlands Navy, which had not capitulated as such, had managed to get most of its ships to England (one, the light cruiser Jacob van Heemskerk was towed since its construction was incomplete). Also, the Netherlands had a large merchant marine, which would contribute greatly to the Allied war effort during the rest of the war.

A few Dutch pilots also had escaped and joined the RAF to fight in the Battle of Britain. In July 1940, two all-Dutch squadrons were formed with personnel and Fokker seaplanes from the Dutch naval air force: 320 Squadron and 321 Squadron (which afterwards moved to Ceylon). The Royal Netherlands Military Flying School was re-established at Hawkins Field, Jackson, Mississippi. In 1943, an all-Dutch fighter squadron was formed in the UK, 322 Squadron.

In 1942, an all-Dutch brigade was formed, the Princess Irene Brigade. This brigade would go on to participate in Operation Overlord in 1944.

Inside the Netherlands, both passive and active resistance was widespread throughout the country, with the first Dutch Resistance organisation, the Communist Party of the Netherlands, holding their first meeting the day after the Dutch capitulation.

The Allied Special Forces also recruited and trained a number of Dutch officers for Operation Jedburgh teams and for the Anglo Dutch Country Section of Force 136.

== Colonial possessions ==
=== East Indies ===
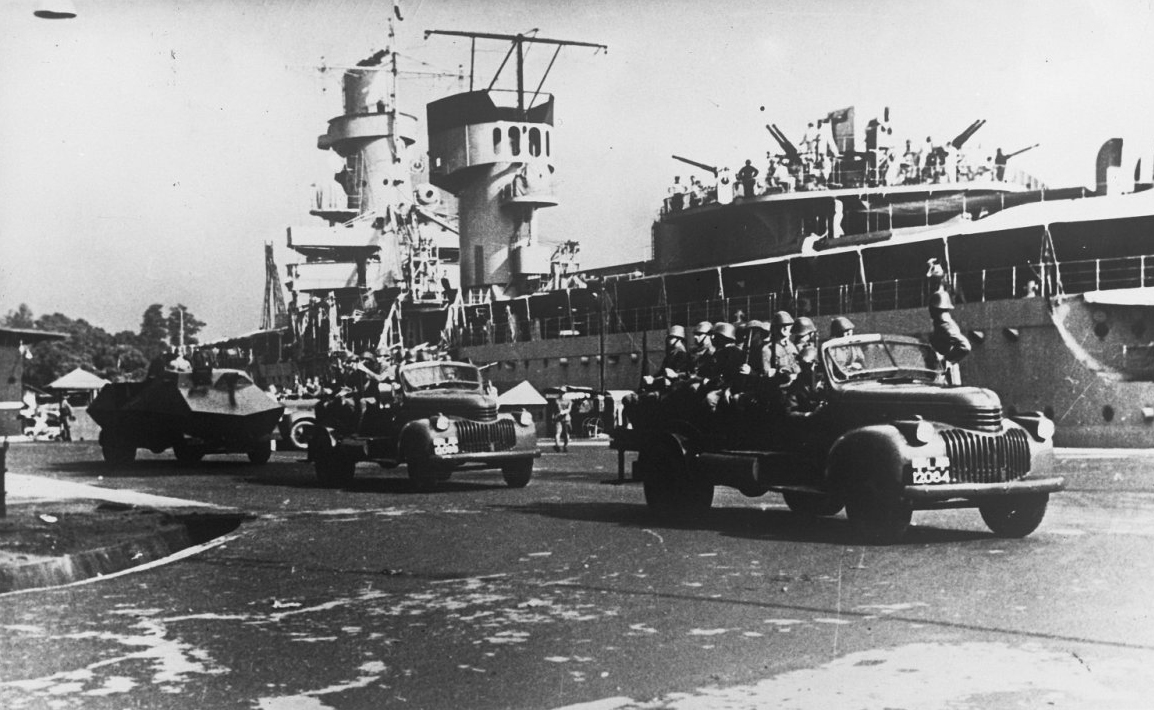
KNIL units passing light cruiser De Ruyter in Soerabaja, c. 1940

After the Japanese attack on Pearl Harbor, the Dutch government declared war on Japan. Like the defense of its mother country, the defense of the Netherlands East Indies (NEI) had been hopelessly neglected; the strongest naval units available were three light cruisers (De Ruyter, Java and Tromp), though they were supported by a relatively large submarine force.

The Dutch participated in the ABDACOM, a joint-command for all American, British, Dutch and Australian units in the area to defend Southeast Asia against the Japanese advance. The Dutch military hastily scrambled its forces to provide an adequate defense. By the time of the Japanese invasion, the Royal Netherlands East Indies Army ("KNIL") numbered about 85,000 troops while the Royal Netherlands East Indies Army Air Force ("ML-KNIL") had 389 planes at its disposal. Nevertheless, despite these efforts, in the three months following Pearl Harbor the Dutch East Indies (along with the rest of Southeast Asia) were overrun by the Japanese. After the Battle of the Java Sea, most naval assets were lost and the Dutch East Indies surrendered on March 8, 1942.

However, some personnel, especially aviators, managed to reach Australia. Later, three joint Australian-NEI squadrons were formed. The first of these, No. 18 (NEI) Squadron RAAF, was formed in April 1942 as a medium bomber squadron equipped with B-25 Mitchell aircraft. The second joint Australian-NEI squadron, No. 119 (NEI) Squadron RAAF, was also to be a medium bomber squadron. No. 119 NEI Squadron was only active between September and December 1943 when it was disbanded to form No. 120 (NEI) Squadron RAAF which was a fighter squadron, equipped with P-40 Kittyhawks. Both No. 18 and No. 120 Squadrons saw action against the Japanese (and against Indonesian nationalists during the Indonesian National Revolution, before being disbanded in 1950).

Some Dutch ships were also based in Australia and Ceylon, and continued to operate in the Indian and Pacific oceans. Due to the high number of submarines present in the Netherlands East Indies (the major part of the defensive plans of the Dutch government), the Dutch were called, in the Asian Campaign, the Fourth Ally. The total number of submarines operating in the Eastern Theater was seventeen.

During the Borneo campaign of 1945, some Dutch army units — including some from the Dutch West Indies and Dutch Guyana — were attached to Australian Army units operating in the Dutch portion of Borneo.

=== West Indies ===
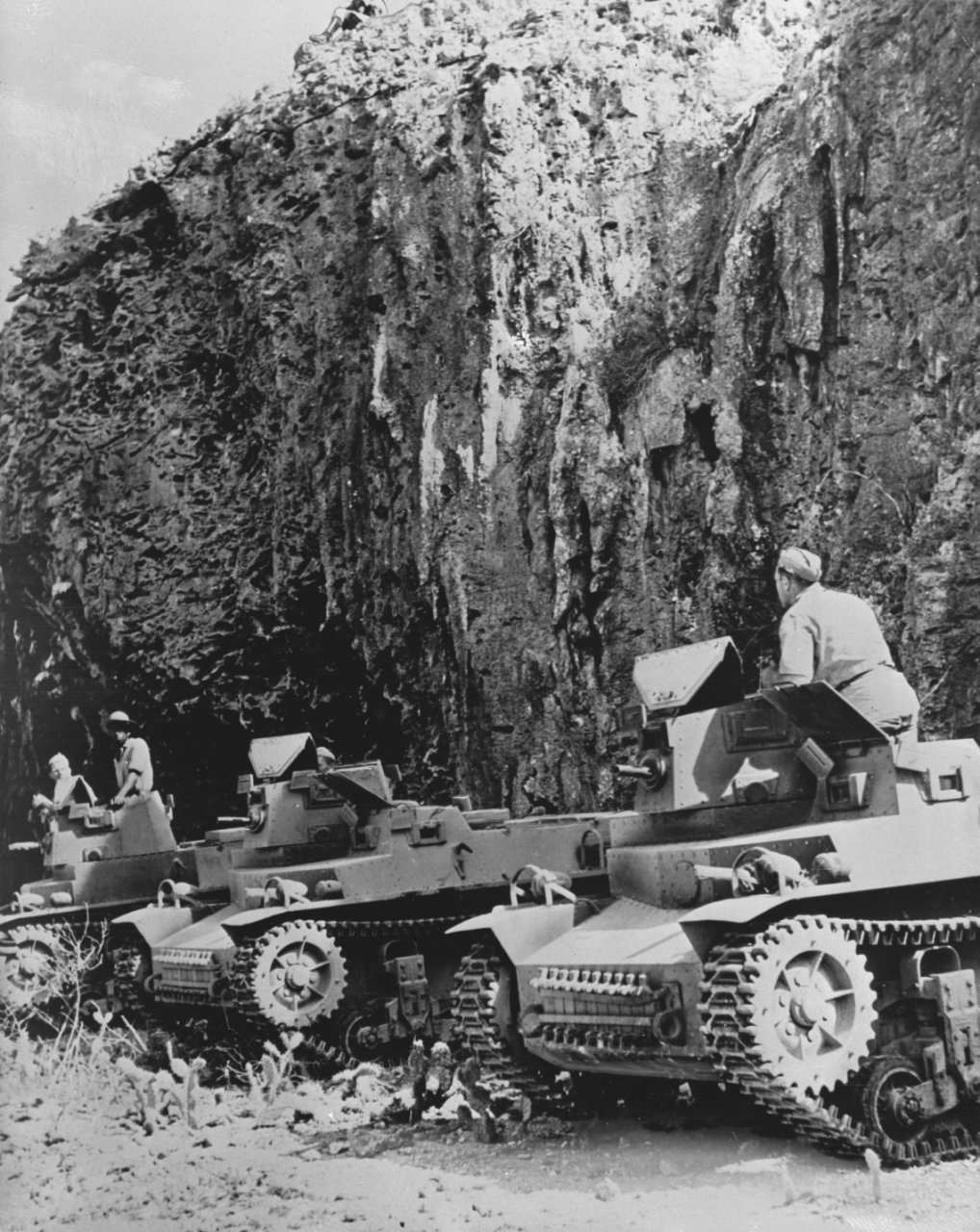
Dutch military exercises on Curaçao

The Netherlands' colonial possessions in the Caribbean comprised the islands of Aruba, Bonaire, Curaçao, Saba, Sint Eustatius and Sint Maarten, and these together with Surinam, made up the Netherlands West Indies.

Aruba was of significant strategic importance as it housed the largest oil terminal in the Caribbean, from which much of Britain's oil was shipped. Oil from Venezuela was taken by coastal tankers to Aruba where it was stored in large tanks awaiting transshipment to oceangoing vessels. These facilities were vulnerable to German attack but as the UK could spare no resources to help protect them, their defense fell to the Netherlands West Indies Defense Force. This Territorial force possessed only small arms, a handful of obsolete 8 cm. naval guns and a few small coastal patrol boats. In the summer of 1940 it was felt that the U-boat threat to the oil terminal and shipping lanes necessitated air cover and so an air support unit was created using a Fokker F.XVIII converted for maritime patrol duties.

In fact, the only military action in the area occurred in February 1942 when the Defense Force's Fokker together with a US aircraft attacked two U-boats off Aruba which had sunk a number of allied oilers. From the summer of 1942 onwards, air cover for the area was provided by US aircraft.

== Liberation ==
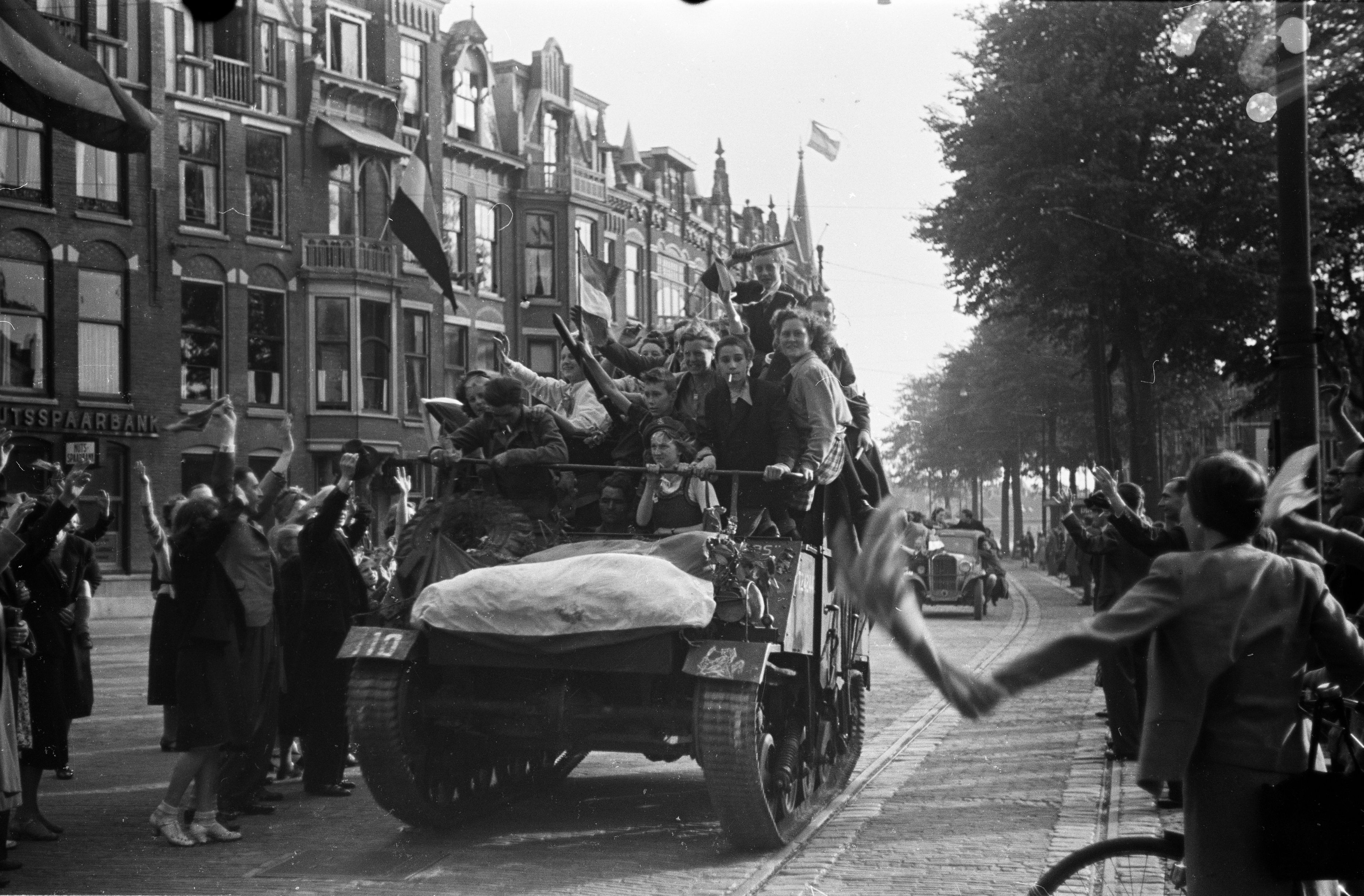
People celebrating the liberation of The Hague on 8 May 1945

The first Allied troops entered the Netherlands on September 9, 1944, on a reconnaissance patrol; on September 12, 1944, a small part of Limburg was liberated by the US 30th Infantry Division. During Operation Market Garden, the Americans and British established a corridor to Nijmegen, but they failed to secure a Rhine crossing at Arnhem.

During the rest of 1944, the Canadian First Army liberated Zeeland in the Schelde Campaign, in order to free access to the harbour of Antwerp. By 1945, the entire southern part of the Netherlands (up to the Waal and Maas rivers) had been liberated.

After Operation Veritable, the Allied advance from the Germany–Netherlands border into the Rhineland, and the crossing of the Rhine at Wesel and Rees in Operation Plunder, the Canadian First Army liberated the eastern and northern parts of the Netherlands, resulting in fights such as the battle of Groningen and the battle of Otterlo. However, they did not attack the German forces in the western part (ironically, they stopped at about where the Grebbe Line was in 1940), for fear of massive civilian casualties: the western part of the Netherlands (also called the Randstad) is one of the most densely populated areas in the world. The civilian population there, still suffering from the effects of the Hongerwinter ('Hungerwinter'), was now cut off from food that was available in the rest of the Netherlands. However, the Germans, having agreed to a truce, did allow the staging of an Allied relief effort, Operations Manna (RAF) and Chowhound (USAAF). The German forces in the Netherlands finally surrendered in Wageningen, on May 5, 1945. The acts of Canadian soldiers toward the civilian population during this period would be a major point of endearment and friendship in Canada–Netherlands relations, among other acts throughout the war, for many years afterward.

== See also ==
- Netherlands in World War II
- Chronological overview of the liberation of Dutch cities and towns during World War II
