= Samuel Ampzing =

Dutch minister, poet and purist

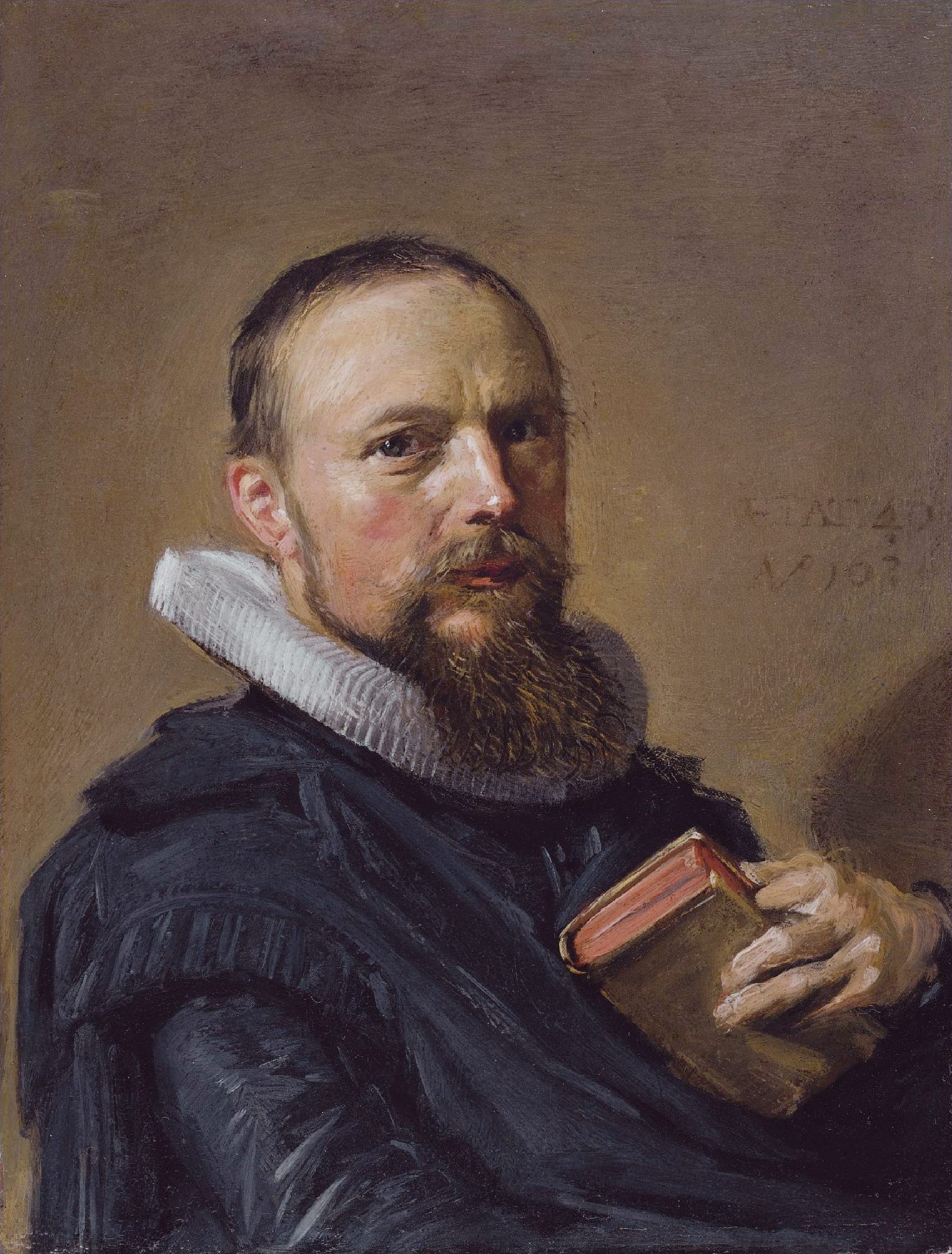
- Samuel Ampzing by Frans Hals
- Born: 24 June 1590; Haarlem
- Died: 29 July 1632 (aged 42); Haarlem

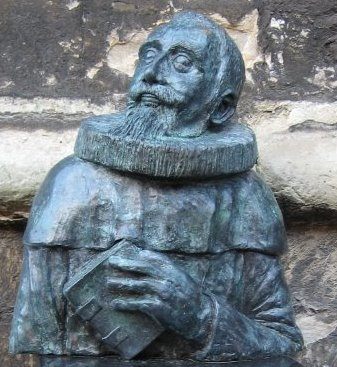
Bust of Samuel Ampzing donated by the Ampzing society.

Samuel Ampzing (24 June 1590 – 29 July 1632) was a Dutch minister, poet and purist.

== Biography ==
Born to the minister Johannes Ampzing in Haarlem, in 1616 Samuel became a minister himself at Rijsoord in Strevelshoek, and in 1619 at the Sint-Bavokerk in Haarlem.

=== Description and praise of Haarlem ===
In 1617, he began writing a description of Haarlem in poetic form, aided by Petrus Scriverius. Its poetry was printed and published in 1628. This history of the city was not superseded until Pieter Langendijk's nearly a century later. As a foreword to this book, Ampzing wrote a dissertation on the Dutch language, in which he also wrote about the rules of rhetoric; this foreword was also sold separately in 1628 under the title ""Taelbericht der Nederlandsche spellinge" ("Treatise on Dutch spelling"). Later, he also wrote an extra "Laurel Wreath to Laurens Janszoon Koster" at the end of it. The book includes some plates by Willem Outgertsz Akersloot after designs by Pieter Saenredam and Jan van de Velde:

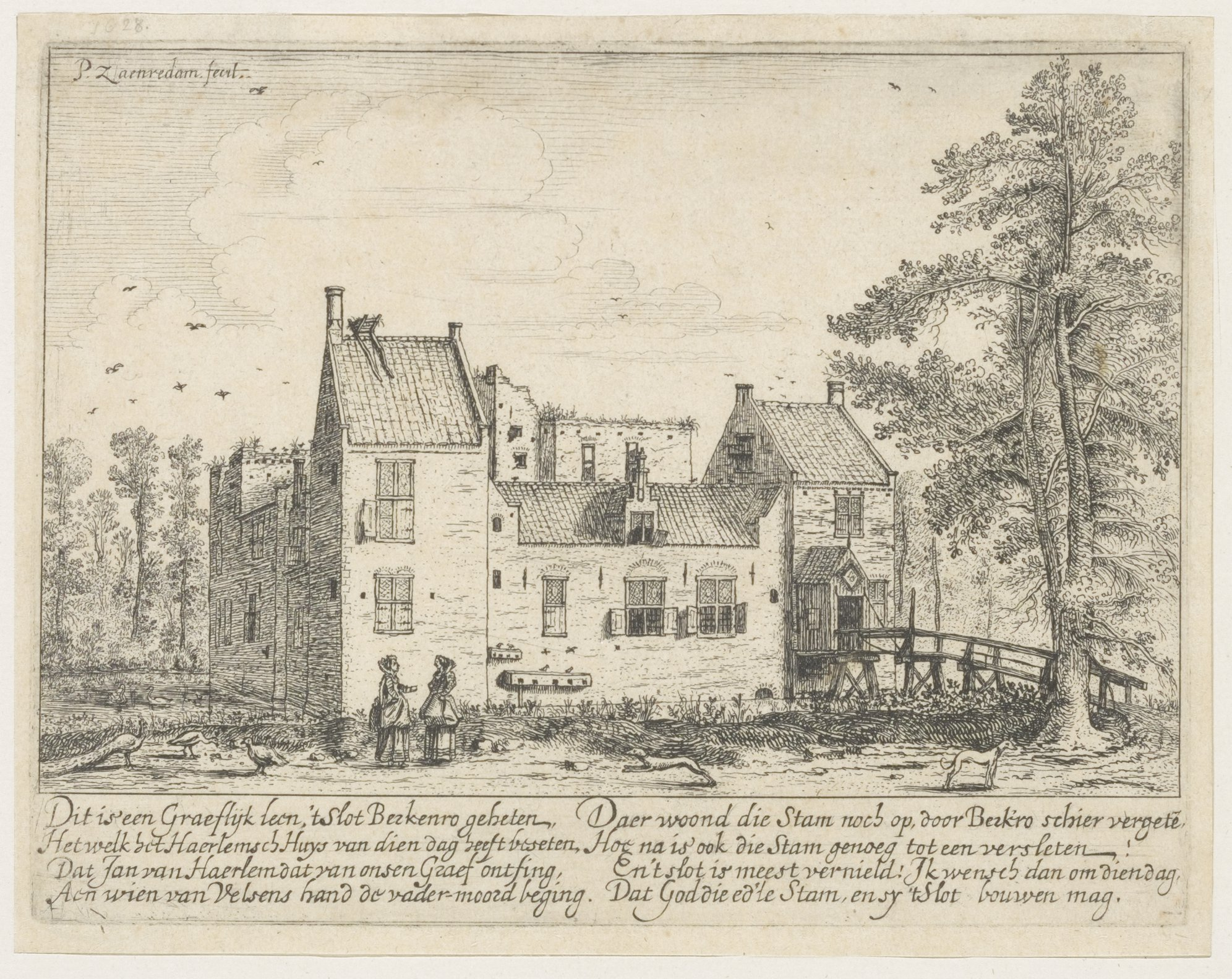
Print of the old castle at Berkenrode, Heemstede.

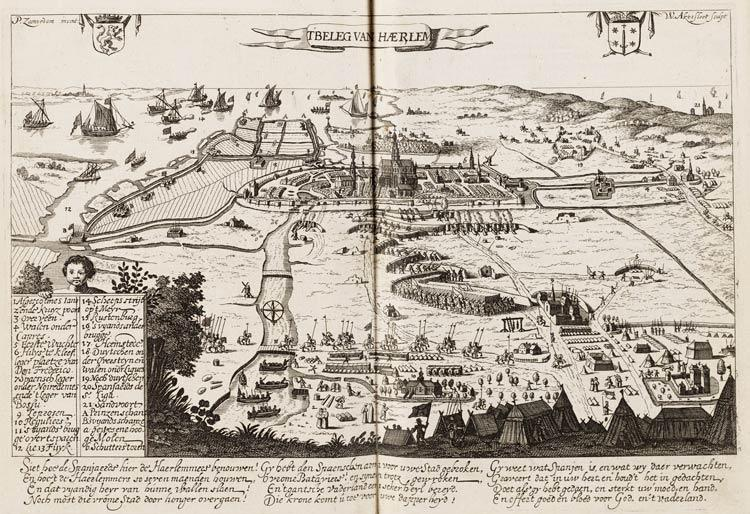
Print of the siege situation sketch at Haarlem in 1572, a bird's eye perspective from the North.

== Legacy ==
Apart from the historical importance of his writing, his poetry was not considered quite lyrical, but it was striking in its groomed linguistic usage. Ampzing was notably and carefully different from his contemporaries in his choice of words, and fervently opposed to using words from different languages, such as Latin and French, in Dutch texts. He considered the influence of these languages as pernicious, and as polluting the pure Dutch language. One suspects that he was also driven to this point of view since these languages were being used by his 'religious competitors'.

Ampzing's lingual struggle was reignited in 1999 by the foundation of the Ampzing Society, whose members fight - like Ampzing - against the superfluous use of English loan-words in the contemporary Dutch language. On 26 November 2006, on the Oude Groenmarkt at Haarlem, they unveiled a bust of Ampzing.

== Works ==
- Bijbel-poezije (1624) - the Bible translated into poetry
- Rijm-catechismus (1624) - the catechism translated into poetry
- Beschrijvinge ende lof der stad Haerlem in Holland: in Rym bearbeyd (1628) - Description and praise of the city Haarlem in Holland in poetry, available in Google books.
- Taelbericht der Nederlandsche spellinge (1628)
- Eerverdediginge tegen de Arminiaensche grimmigheijd (1629) - Apologia against the Arminian heretics
- Naszousche lauren-kranze (1629) - laurel wreath
- Westindische triumphbazuin op de verovering van de zilveren vloot (1629) - west Indies triumphal ode on the defeat of the silver fleet
