= IJsselmonde =

IJsselmonde may refer to:

- IJsselmonde (island), an island near Rotterdam, Netherlands
- IJsselmonde (village), a former village on the island of IJsselmonde
- IJsselmonde (Rotterdam), one of the boroughs of Rotterdam
