= Akersloot (surname) =

Akersloot is a surname. Notable people with the surname include:

- Betzy Akersloot-Berg, Norwegian-born painter in the Netherlands
- Outgert Ariss Akersloot, Dutch Golden Age silversmith
- Willem Outgertsz Akersloot, Dutch Golden Age engraver

== See also ==
- Akersloot, Netherlands
