= Oostendam =

- Village
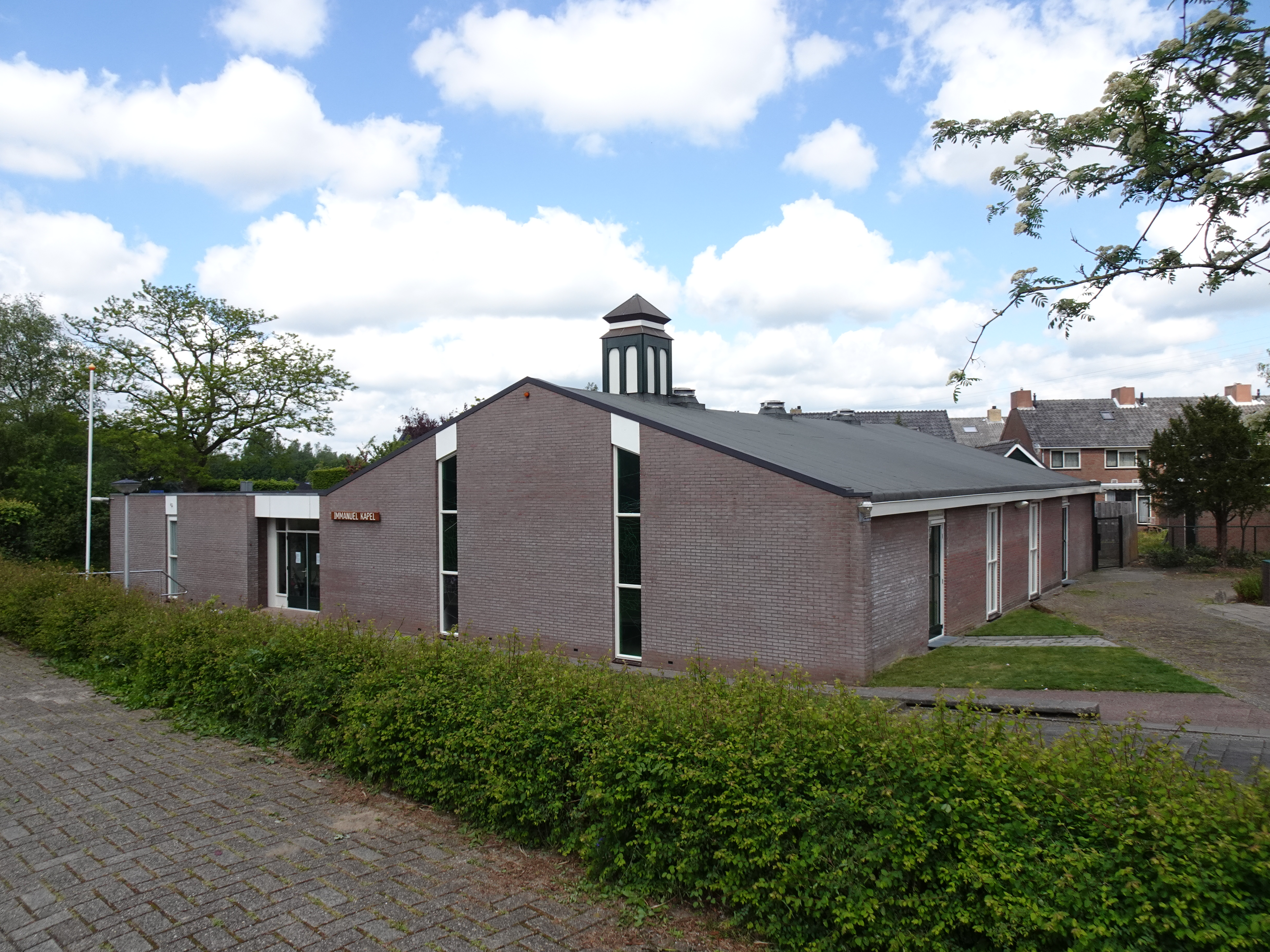
- Immanuel Chapel

- Location in the province of South Holland in the Netherlands Location in the Netherlands
- Coordinates: 51°51′N 4°38′E
- Country: Netherlands
- Province: South Holland
- Municipality: Ridderkerk

Area
  - Total: 1.72 km^{2} (0.66 sq mi)
- Elevation: 0.3 m (0.98 ft)

Population (2021)
  - Total: 615
  - Density: 358/km^{2} (926/sq mi)
- Time zone: UTC+1 (CET)
  - Summer (DST): UTC+2 (CEST)
- Postal code: 2989
- Dialing code: 0180

Oostendam is a Dutch village. It is located in the municipality of Ridderkerk, within the province of South Holland.

The village was first mentioned in 1435 as "totten cleynen Waldammen toe, die men heet op desen voorsz. tyt Dappers - dam", and means "eastern dam". The dam was founded in 1332 when Count William III had dikes built around a side-arm of the river Waal. As it is currently a dead branch of the river, the locals commonly refer to it as the Waaltje, meaning Little Waal. Oostendam is located on the island of IJsselmonde, which is largely occupied by the nearby city of Rotterdam.

A part of the village was located in the municipality of Hendrik-Ido-Ambacht. It has been annexed and is now a neighbourhood with Hendrik-Ido-Ambacht. It used to have a harbour, but it was closed in 1950. In 1946, the Immanuel Chapel was built as emergency church. It was extensively modified in 1976. In 2000, the church was extended and the former day care centre was redesigned as consistory.
