= Sandelingen Ambacht =

Coordinates: 51°50′45″N 4°37′0″E

Sandelingen Ambacht is a polder about 12 km southeast of Rotterdam and a neighborhood of Hendrik-Ido-Ambacht, South Holland.

== History ==
Sandelingen Ambacht became a separate municipality in 1817, when it separated from Rijsoord.

In 1840, the community of Sandelingen Ambacht had 32 houses and 390 residents.

In 1855 it merged into Hendrik-Ido-Ambacht.
