= Henk van Lijnschooten =

Dutch composer (1928–2006)

Hendrickus Cornelius "Henk" van Lijnschooten (28 March 1928 in The Hague – 1 November 2006 in Hendrik-Ido-Ambacht) was a Dutch composer, who also wrote under the names Ted Huggens and Michel van Delft.

== Life ==
Henk van Lijnschooten went to his local music school for violin and clarinet lessons. His initial studies were with Koeberg Fritz (1876-1961) in music theory, composition and conducting technique. He completed his training as the Concert Band Conductor of The Hague Royal Conservatory. In 1957 he was appointed as the successor to the conductor of the Marine Band of the Royal Dutch Navy. With this orchestra he traveled throughout Europe and the United States. From 1965 to 1970 he was professor of woodwinds at the Conservatory of Rotterdam. After that, he taught at the Conservatory Concert Directorate in Arnhem and the Rotterdam Conservatory. In 1985 he was decorated as Knight of the Order of Orange-Nassau.

=== Works for Wind Orchestra ===
- 1950 Small Classical Overture
- 1961 Retreat Francaise
- 1962 Rhapsody on sea shanties
- 1963 Netherlands Suite
- 1965 The Beggars of Bomlerwaard
- 1966 Concertante Music Tower
- 1966 Hanselijn
- 1966 Patriotic Rhapsody
- 1966 Carnival Music
- 1967 Little Suite on folk songs
- 1967 Bells Festival
- 1967 Overture for a Tattoo
- 1968 Cecilia's Dance
- 1968 Jeu de Cuivre Fanfare for Orchestra
  - Marcia Capriccioso
  - Choral
  - Scherzo
  - Folk Dance
- 1968 Small Game Music
- 1968 Rhapsody from the Low Countries
- 1968 The Girl and the Drummer
- 1969 Eight sound studies
- 1969 Count Seven
- 1969 Three Old Dutch pictures
- 1970 Four Impressions
- 1971 Le Jeu Premier
  - Love song
  - Cavatina
  - Rondo
- 1971 Overture for Fun
- 1973 Variations on a French folk song
- 1975 Suite from the Antwerp Dance Book (1583)
  - Almande Poussinghe
  - Branle de Bourgogne
  - Pavane
  - Ballo Anglese
- 1975 Rhapsodie Francaise
- 1976 Variations on a Japanese Folk Song
- 1977 Currents
- 1977 Three Caprices
- 1978 Eight Adagios
- 1978 United Youth
- 1978 Three Caprices for Band
  - Tricky Metrics
  - Chant
  - Rondo Folklorique
- 1978 Three Folk Sketches
  - French Cocktail
  - Ballad of the two Royal Children
  - Rondeau Ecossais
- 1978 Suite on a Hymn
  - Hymn
  - Variations
  - Intermezzo
- 1978 Rossini's Birthday Party
- 1978 The Happy Cyclist
- 1979 20 Systematic mood exercises
- 1979 Junior variations
- 1979 Music for Flexible Wind
- 1979 Wilhelmina
- 1980 A Tribute to the Liberators
- 1980 Five intradas for Brass band and Drums
- 1981 Air for Two for the carillon and brass band
- 1982 Suite on Greek Love Songs
- 1985 Interruptions for Symphonic Wind Orchestra and Percussion
  - Choral and Cadenza
  - Dance and Procession (collage)
- 1987 Four Characters
  - Fanfare
  - Chant serieux
  - Scherzo Concertante
  - Motions
- 1987 Sports Overture
- 1988 Variations on Oranges and Lemons
- 1989 Rhapsody from Scotland
- 1989 Classical Sinfonia
- 1989 Hymn to Wine
- 1990 Overture 2000
- 1990 Little Dance Overture
- 1990 Suite of Unity
- 1991 I.M.M.S. Mars
- 1993 Music makes Friends
- 1993 Academic Fanfare from Music for Wageningen
- 1993 Music for Rhapsody Guelders from Wageningen
- Supplication for 1993 World Future in Wageningen for Children Music for voice and orchestra
- 1993 Viva la Musica
- 1993 Suite Salon
  - Entrance
  - Invitation a la danse
  - Chiaconna
  - Danse Finale
- 1993 Hebrew Rhapsody
- 1998 Rhapsody fan Fryslân harmony or fanfare orchestra

=== Works of Ted Huggens ===
- 1970 New Baroque Suite, for wind band or orchestra
- 1973 Choral and Rock-Out, harmony or fanfare orchestra
- 1974 Ragtime Suite
  - Yankee doodle rag
  - Intermezzo: beautiful janet
  - Rag or the jolly good fellows
- 1974 Pavane in Blue
- 1974 Fascinating Drums
- 1976 Ballad and Concertant
  - Ballad
  - Concertant
- 1977 Song for Lovers
- 1977 Rock Train
- 1978 Treble Concerto
  - Adagio
  - Allegro
- 1978 Air Nostalgique for alto saxophone and orchestra
- 1978 Reflections on this time
  - The Exciting New Harmony Band
  - Blue Air
  - Fugue A la Mode
- 1978 The Happy Cyclist
- 1978 Give us Peace
- 1980 Airs d'Ambiance
- 1981 Air Poetique for Horn and orchestra
- 1981 Scottish Souvenir
- 1981 Der junge Glöckner
- 1981 Fantasie über ein Lied Vesper
- 1981 Abschied ohne Worte
- 1982 Interplay for Band
- 1982 New Hymns on old words
- 1982 Sparkling Drums for percussion and orchestra
- 1983 Adagietto for Flute
- 1990 The young Mary
- 1991 Symphony of Praise
  - Come, come spirit of life
  - Nearer my god to thee
  - Hymn of Thanksgiving
- 1992 Six Spirituals
- 1992 High Tea
- 1992 Choral for Trombone and Band
- 1992 Italienische Lust Spiel Overture
- 1993 Concerto for Pleasure for Flugelhorn (trumpet) and harmony or fanfare orchestra
  - Allegro Vivace
  - Blues
  - Rondo
- 1993 Junior Concerto for Flute and Band
  - Romance
  - Rondo
- 1993 A Tribute to Stephen Foster
- Sinfonia Classica
  - Allegro Animato
  - Andante con espressione
  - Rondo Presto

=== Works of Michiel van Delft ===
- 1970 With Horns and Trumpets for horn Corps
- 1970 Nicolette for marching band
- 1970 Dialogue for drum corps
- 1972 Serenade for Michel
- 1972 Rag 2000
- 1976 Rock The Wonderful Machine
- 1984 Fantasy on the Old Hundredth
- 1985 Easy Tune for the Young Ones
- 1986 Overture über einen Spiritual

=== Chamber music ===
- Canon 1950, for two clarinets
- Fughetta 1950, for brass quartet
- 1967 Variations on a Flemish folk song, for brass quartet
- 1969 Capriccio, for recorders
- 1969 Mini Concerto for horn and brass quartet
- 1969 Music for young blazers
- Chorale prelude, for horn quartet
- Music, for horn and percussion (vibraphone, temple blocks, marimba, bongos, drums, hi-hat, congas, glockenspiel)

=== Works for accordion ===
- 1970 rhapsodic Three miniatures for accordion orchestra
- 1975 Various pieces for accordion
- Three Folk Sketches, for accordion orchestra

=== Works for plucked instruments ===
- 1967 Second Rhapsody from the Low Countries, for mandolin orchestra

=== Soundtracks ===
- 1964 Acqua di Roma
- 1966 Refugee Film
- 1967 Marine Corps
