= Strevelshoek =

- Hamlet
- Coat of arms

- Location within South Holland
- Coordinates: 51°51′14″N 4°34′54″E
- Country: Netherlands
- Province: South Holland
- Municipality: Ridderkerk

Strevelshoek is a hamlet in the Dutch province of South Holland. It is located about 1 km northwest of the village of Rijsoord, on the south bank of the Waaltje. The hamlet is not mentioned on recent topographical maps.

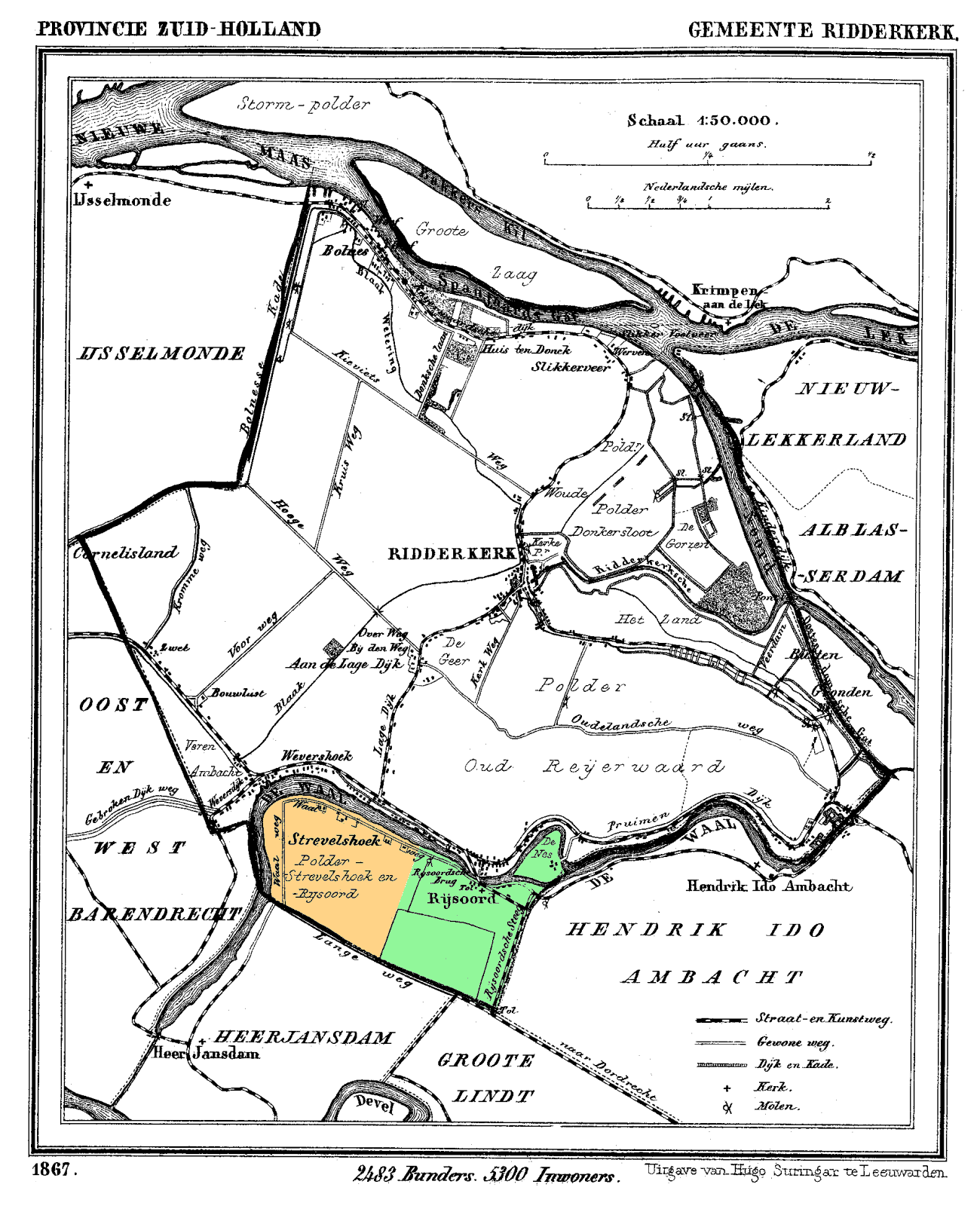
1870 map of Ridderkerk, with the former municipality of Strevelshoek highlighted in orange.

Strevelshoek was a separate municipality between 1817 and 1846, when it merged with Rijsoord. According to the 19th-century historian A.J. van der Aa, there were five houses in the municipality around 1845, four of which made up the hamlet Strevelshoek. The municipality had about 40 inhabitants. The area is now part of the municipality of Ridderkerk.
