= Bert Sas =

Dutch military officer and attaché (1892–1948)

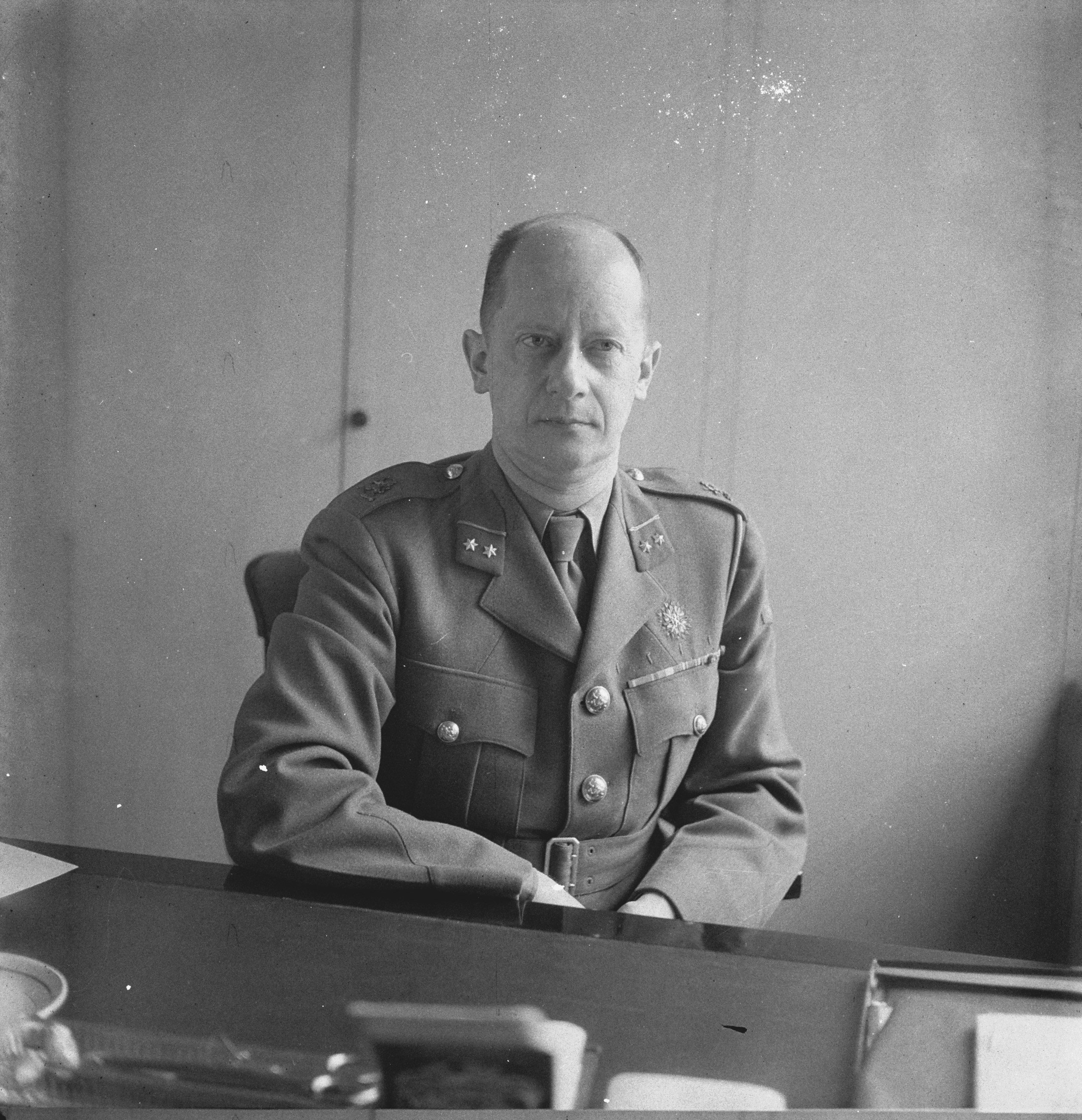
- Sas as a Lieutenant Colonel in 1942
- Born: Gijsbertus Jacobus Sas; August 1, 1892; Leeuwarden, Netherlands
- Died: October 20, 1948 (aged 56); Prestwick, Scotland
- Military career
- Branch: Royal Netherlands Army
- Rank: lieutenant-general

Gijsbertus Jacobus "Bert" Sas (1 August 1892 – 20 October 1948) was a Dutch military officer. He served as the Netherlands military attaché in Berlin at the time of the German invasion of the Netherlands in May 1940 and provided some advance warning of the German attack.

== Early life ==
Sas was born in Leeuwarden, Netherlands. He was named after his father, a soldier who by his pension had reached the rank of lieutenant colonel. His mother Geertrui Huiber was 20 years younger than her husband. Sas was the youngest of 3 children, and attended a secondary school in Leeuwarden.

== Career ==
In 1910 he went to the Koninklijke Militaire Academie in Breda. During World War I, in 1917, he was promoted to first lieutenant and married Maria Johanna van der Minne. From 1923 until 1926 he followed the training for staff officier at the Hogere Krijgsschool. After this he obtained another staff function in The Hague. In 1928 he was promoted to the rank of captain and became head of the most important bureau of the 2nd division where all of the important military questions were handled. However, during the period from 1928 until 1936, military expenditure was strictly limited.

Between 1936 and 1937 he was the military attaché in Berlin for 10 days per month, spending the remaining 20 days in The Hague. He was then recalled to The Hague, where he functioned as the right-hand man of General Reijnders in the role of head of the operations division. During this period he grew a sincere friendship with the German Abwehr-officer Hans Oster. Oster had been paired to Sas during the Olympic Games and both men liked each other beyond the regular courtesies and their families developed warm ties.

In March 1939, following the German annexation of the Sudetenland, Reijnders sent him back to Berlin. This time he set up residence there with his wife Miep.In Berlin he immediately restored his friendship with the German colonel Hans Oster. Oster had obtained an important position as the right hand of Wilhelm Canaris at the German Abwehr, the espionage and counter-espionage service of the army. They were connected not only through their mutual dislike for the Nazi regime. Their friendship dated from the beginning of the 1930s, when they first met, possibly when Sas was working in The Hague. Oster passed him all important information that he obtained. He did not do this out of sympathy for Sas, but because he considered it his duty to Germany. He did not see himself as a traitor, but someone who did his duty to the decent Germany that he loved.

At end of August 1939, he warned The Hague that a war with Poland was about to begin. He gave 25 August 1939 as the invasion date, but this date passed by. At 14:50 on that day Hitler gave the order for the invasion, but revoked it when he heard that England was not going to concede. Sas' credibility suffered. When he reported on 31 August that the war was now close, the head of the general staff intelligence section, Van der Plassche did not believe him, although others did. Sas was the only one who delivered this report: London and Paris gave reassurance. However the Netherlands mobilised at the insistence of Queen Wilhelmina. General Reijnders, still his superior in The Hague, was positive over Sas' information. His relationship with General Reijnders remained good as long as the neutrality of Netherlands was not discussed.

During September and October 1939, Sas obtained more signals that the neutrality of the Netherlands would not remain inviolate. Oster, during this time, assured him that only Belgium would be the target, which was consistent with German planning for some time. However Sas did not believe this. At his insistence, Oster obtained further information from the German headquarters in Zossen. This showed that the suspicions that Sas had were correct: the Netherlands would be invaded together with Belgium, albeit that the several German plans varied between the autumn of 1939 and February 1940 in relation to the Dutch component.

The violation of neutrality which was initially planned as minor and just involving the extreme south of the country would eventually not be limited to a passage through southern Limburg into Belgium but involve an all out invasion of the country. Sas warned the Dutch and other contacts of the upcoming German invasion on 10 May 1940. Oster informed him of the plans within the hour of it becoming solid (codename "Danzig") and it got Sas contacting his superior in the Hague - who again did not believe him - and other contacts. The Dutch supreme command believed him and alerted the armed forces overnight. The Belgian and French reply was less accurate. Sas, as a diplomat, was not interned and allowed to travel to Switzerland, after which he travelled on to London and joined the Dutch army-in-exile.

Sas had been promoted to lieutenant-general in a senior army function when he died in the 1948 KLM Constellation air disaster in Prestwick, Scotland.
