= Cornelis Ekkart =

Dutch fencer (1892–1975)

Personal information
- Born: 1 August 1892 Oegstgeest, Netherlands
- Died: 30 June 1975 (aged 82) Hendrik-Ido-Ambacht, Netherlands

Sport
- Sport: Fencing

Cornelis Ekkart (1 August 1892 – 30 June 1975) was a Dutch fencer. He competed at the 1924 and 1928 Summer Olympics.
