= Jacob van der Schuere =

Dutch writer (1576-c.1643)

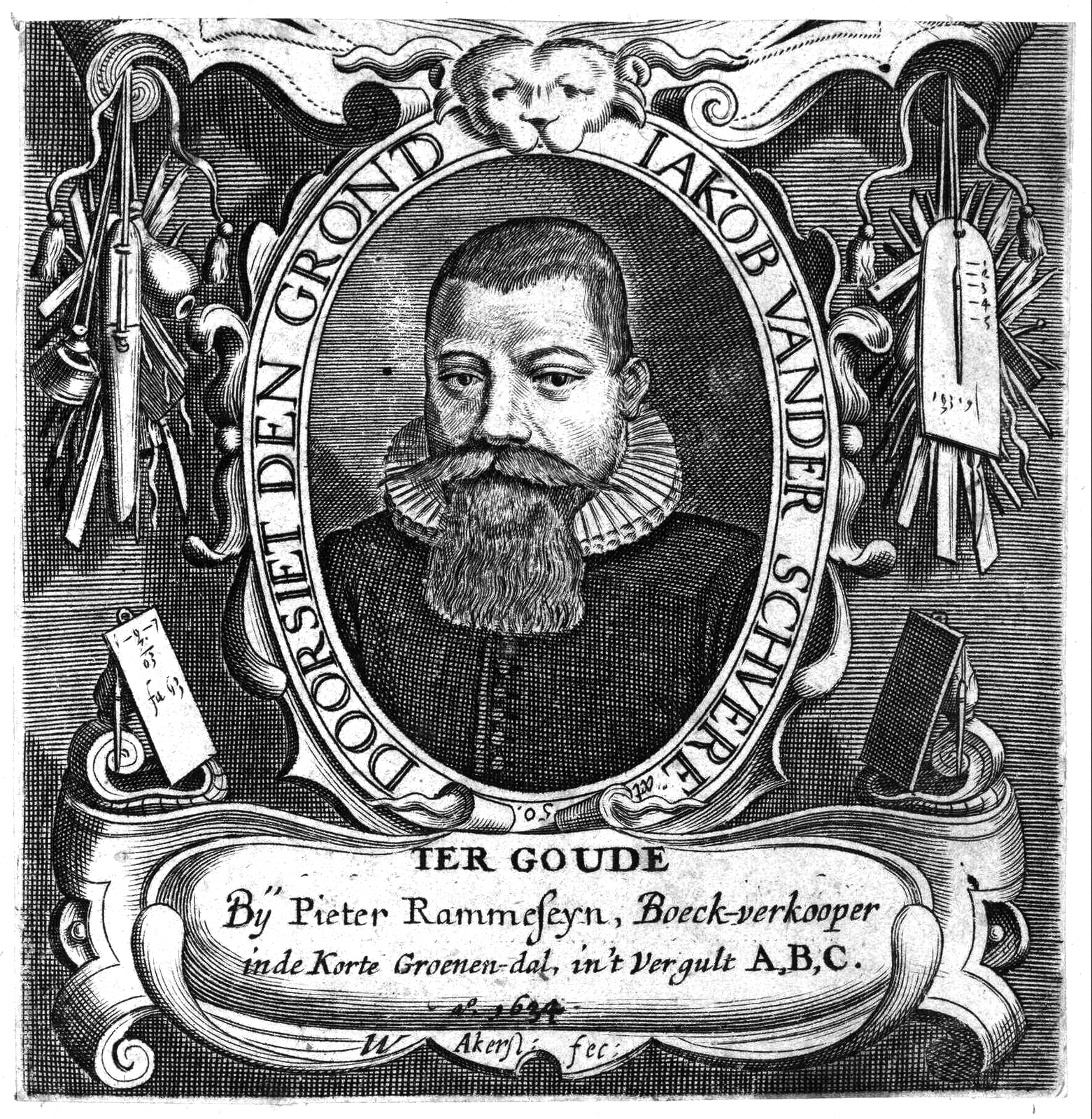
Jacob van der Schuere, by Willem Outgertsz Akersloot

Jacob van der Schuere (1576 – after 1643), was a Dutch Golden Age writer.

== Biography ==
He was born in Menen but moved north to Haarlem where he became a schoolmaster and wrote educational books. In 1612, he published the work Nederduytsche spellinge, which was a proposal for a comprehensive spelling of the Dutch language and in 1643 he published the math book Arithmetica oft reken-konst.

He probably died in Haarlem some time after the publication of his second book, though his death is not recorded.
