= Henri Winkelman =

Dutch military officer (1876–1952)

General Henri Winkelman
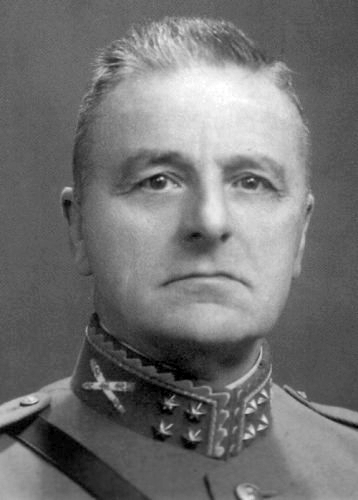

Commander-in-chief of the Dutch Armed forces
- In office 6 February 1940 – 15 May 1940
- Deputy: Godfried van Voorst tot Voorst
- Preceded by: Izaak Reijnders
- Succeeded by: Vacant (1940–1944); Prince Bernhard of Lippe-Biesterfeld

Personal details
- Born: Henri Gerard Winkelman; 17 August 1876 Maastricht, Netherlands
- Died: 27 December 1952 (aged 76) Soesterberg, Netherlands
- Spouse: Arendina Jacomina Coert (m. 1902)
- Awards: Military William Order (Knight 4th Class); Order of the Netherlands Lion (Knight Grand Cross); Mobilization War Cross

Military service
- Allegiance: Netherlands
- Branch/service: Royal Netherlands Army; Royal Netherlands East Indies Army
- Years of service: 1892–1934; 1939–1945
- Rank: General
- Battles/wars: World War II; Battle of the Netherlands; Battle for The Hague; Battle of France

Henri Gerard Winkelman (17 August 1876 – 27 December 1952) was a Dutch military officer who served as Commander-in-chief of the Armed forces of the Netherlands during the German invasion of the Netherlands.

== Pre-war ==
Winkelman was born in Maastricht as the son of Julius Hendrik Winkelman and Charlotte Henriëtte Braams. After he completed his secondary education he attended the Royal Military Academy (KMA) in Breda. His goal was to become an officer in the KNIL, the Dutch colonial army for the Dutch East Indies. During his training he adjusted his goal and became an infantry officer. He was promoted to Lieutenant in 1896.

He married Arendin Jacomina Coert in 1902 and they had two sons and two daughters. Having completed his military education, he began to climb up the ranks of the Dutch army. In 1913 he was promoted to Captain, in 1923 he became a Major and in 1931 he was given the rank of Major General and became the commander of the Dutch 4th division. In 1934 he became a Lieutenant General, but left the military shortly thereafter. Winkelman campaigned for the position of Chief of Staff of the Dutch Army, but lost to General Izaak Reijnders. Winkelman then decided to retire and was granted an honorable discharge. As a retired officer, he remained active in various ways and consulted.

The Dutch mobilised their armed forces on 28 August 1939, four days before Nazi Germany's invasion of Poland. Chief of Staff, General Reijnders, was appointed as Supreme Commander of the Dutch forces, but it was clear from the outset that his personal and professional relationship with Defence secretary Adriaan Dijxhoorn left a lot to be desired, ultimately leading to Reijnders' (honorable) discharge on 5 February 1940. After a brief meeting of the Dutch cabinet, General Winkelman was summoned to The Hague (the seat of the Dutch government) and offered appointment as the new Dutch commander. He accepted the job the following day.

== War ==
Winkelman was well aware of his army's limitations. He had 280,000 men at his disposal, not enough to defend the entire country. The Dutch army possessed no tanks. There was a lack of field artillery and anti-aircraft guns. Winkelman was convinced that the Dutch army was incapable of a modern, "mobile" defence. Instead, he decided to keep things simple: the Dutch would only defend "Fortress Holland" (the North Holland, South Holland and Utrecht provinces, roughly the area now referred to as the Randstad), using traditional, static defence lines and fortified fixed positions. Winkelman did not have the illusion that the Dutch could push Hitler's armies back into Germany. Instead, the Dutch forces should simply slow the Germans down, win time and keep Fortress Holland in Dutch hands long enough to enable the Allies to join them.

In practice, the three northern provinces (Drenthe, Groningen and Friesland) would remain largely undefended. State-of-the-art fortifications at the east end of the Afsluitdijk (the long dike connecting the Friesland and North Holland provinces) were expected to stop the German invasion and prevent the Germans from threatening Fortress Holland from the north. In the east of the country, the first line of resistance ran along the IJssel and Maas rivers. The main Dutch defence line, however, was in the very heart of the country and called the Grebbe Line, to be defended by the entire 2nd and 4th Army Corps. The Grebbe Line was to be defended until the bitter end, as the eastern front of Fortress Holland (the New Dutch Water Line, once the pride of the Dutch defence system was deemed obsolete and too close to major cities such as Utrecht and Amsterdam).

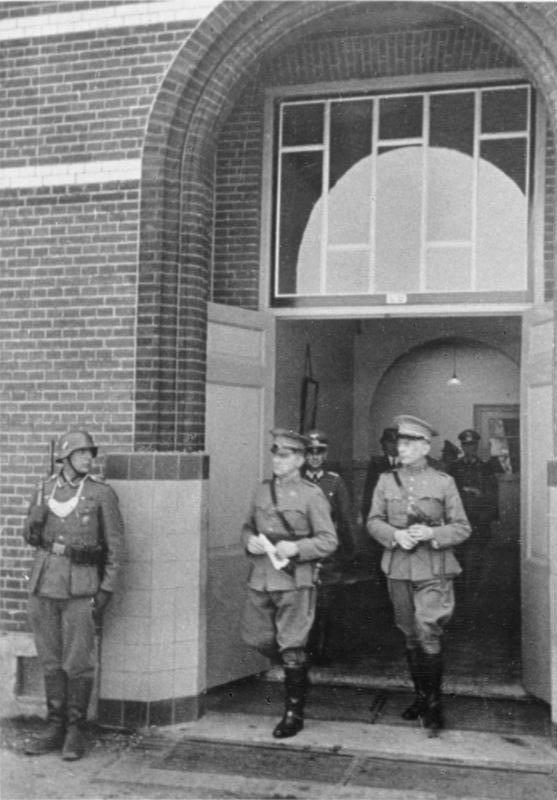
General Henri Winkelman after signing the Dutch capitulation on 15 May 1940.

The German invasion started on 10 May 1940 at 3:55 a.m. local time. Hitler's bold plan to drop paratroopers around The Hague, push into the city and capture the Dutch government, the Royal Family and the Supreme Army Command to force the Netherlands to its knees within 24 hours, ended in failure. In the east, the Germans crossed the Dutch borders with relative ease, but were halted near the main Dutch defences: the Grebbe Line and the Afsluitdijk fortifications. After one day of war, General Winkelman was relatively satisfied about the way his troops had reacted to the first German push. The only area where the situation was already critical was in the south: paratroopers had secured the Moerdijk bridges, south of Rotterdam and Dordrecht. Meanwhile, strong German infantry (supported by the 9th Panzer Division) had smashed through the so-called Peel-Raam Stelling and now marched rapidly through the southern province of North Brabant, threatening to establish contact with the bridge head at Moerdijk and to enter Fortress Holland from the south, effectively isolating the Netherlands from Belgium and France. An attempt, supported by French units, to recapture the Moerdijk bridges failed on 11 May. Attempts to regain lost ground in the Grebbe Line were also unsuccessful.

On 13 May, after the departure of Queen Wilhelmina to London, and with most ministers in Hoek van Holland ready to depart, minister Max Steenberghe, on his own initiative, but in name of the queen and cabinet, granted the powers of government within the European part of the Netherlands to Winkelman, and requested that the permanent secretaries follow his directions. This was later informally confirmed by the cabinet and afterwards by the queen.

The Grebbe Line fell in the evening of 13 May after a ferocious battle of three days. Meanwhile, the 9th Panzer Division had reached the Moerdijk bridges, breaching "Fortress Holland" and reaching Rotterdam, occupying the south bank of the river Meuse. The situation had now become strategically hopeless, but the north river bank was still in Dutch hands. Dutch machine guns made it impossible for the Germans to cross the Meuse bridges as Dutch marines put up fierce resistance in the streets of Rotterdam, much to the annoyance of Adolf Hitler, who expected to have occupied the Netherlands by now. On 14 May, he ordered that Dutch resistance be crushed at once. The bombing of Rotterdam followed and with the Germans threatening to give major Dutch city Utrecht the same treatment, General Winkelman was forced to surrender in the evening of 14 May. The capitulation was made official the next day in the village of Rijsoord. After he signed the Dutch surrender, General Winkelman refused to officially declare that he would not resist the German forces in the Netherlands. He was therefore interned on 2 July 1940 and remained a prisoner of war for the remainder of the occupation.

== Post-war ==
He was honorably discharged from the Dutch army after the war on 1 October 1945 and given the Military William Order, the oldest and highest military decoration in the Netherlands. His statue can still be seen in front of the elementary school in Rijsoord, where he signed the capitulation on 15 May 1940. An army base in Nunspeet was named after him. The name was transferred to another base (at Harskamp) as of 15 May 2007, after the former closed down. General Henri Winkelman died peacefully at his home on 27 December 1952.

Military offices
Preceded by Izaak Reijnders	Commander-in-chief of the Armed forces of the Netherlands; 1940	Vacant Title next held by Prince Bernhard of Lippe-Biesterfeld (1944)
