= Waaltje =

River in the Netherlands

Coordinates: 51.8548°N 4.5799°E

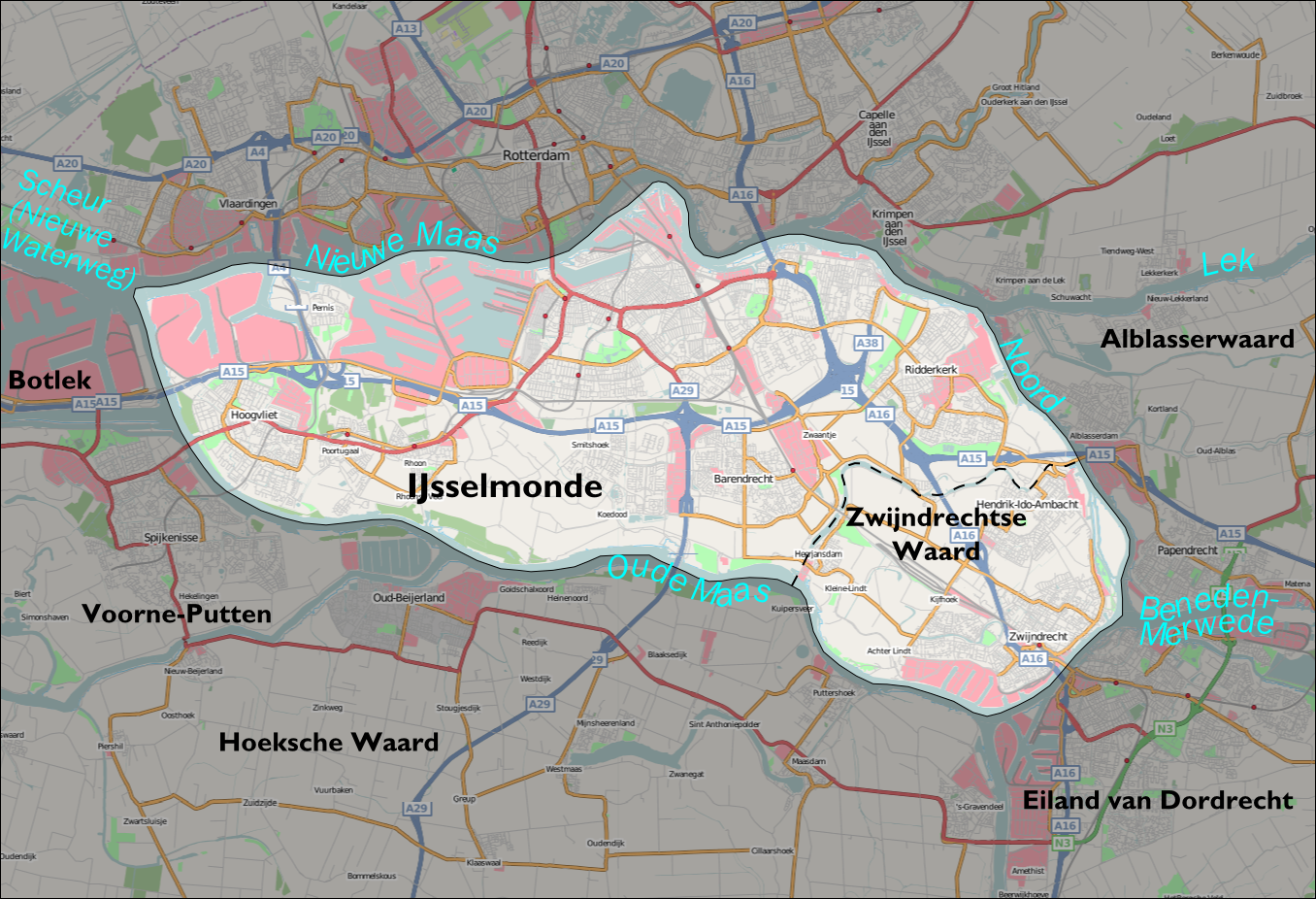
Map of present-day IJsselmonde with the Waaltje as a dashed line, separating the former island Zwijndrechtse Waard from the historic extent of IJsselmonde.

The Waaltje (common name; Dutch for Little Waal) is a dammed river in the western Netherlands, southeast of Rotterdam. Historically it used to be the western end of the Waal river, hence its official name continues to be the Waal, although the intermediate Waal sections, the Boven Merwede, Beneden Merwede, and a subsection of the Noord, have long changed their names.

== The water ==
The Waaltje marks the border between the Zwijndrechtse Waard, formerly a separate island, and the historic Island of IJsselmonde. Ever since this section of the Waal was dammed, IJsselmonde also encompasses the Zwijndrechtse Waard (see map to the right).

The Waaltje runs from Hendrik-Ido-Ambacht, along Oostendam, through Rijsoord, and along Barendrecht to Heerjansdam. In Heerjansdam it now connects to the Oude Maas through a pumping station. In 1332 William I, Count of Hainaut had the Waal dammed at Oostendam. The Waaltje connected to the Noord through the old port of Ambacht and a lock that enabled riverboats to pass the Oostendam until the 20th century. Since then, no sailing connection is available.

More recently, the old port of Ambacht has also been dammed on the northeast side, transforming it into another enclosed section of the old Waal.

== Bridges, roads and paths ==
The Waaltje is crossed by a highway, the A16, the railway between Rotterdam and Dordrecht, the HSL and the Betuweroute. The A15 runs between the A16 and the Noord to the north of the Waaltje.

Along the eastern bank of the Waaltje in Heerjansdam, between the clubhouse of the business association and the restaurant, volunteers from among others the environmental association Heerjansdam created an educational nature trail named Waalpad. Other walking trails along the Waaltje can be found in Hendrik-Ido-Ambacht, along the Kerkstraat and between Oordenweg and Jaapgpad. Nature development Wevershoek in Barendrecht also offers opportunities to walk along the Waaltje.

== Management and direct uses ==
The Waaltje is managed by the water board Hollandse Delta. Its waters are on the clear end. It is used for boating, amateur fishing, diving, swimming and ice skating. Diving school "Before the corals" operates in the vicinity of het Waaltje.

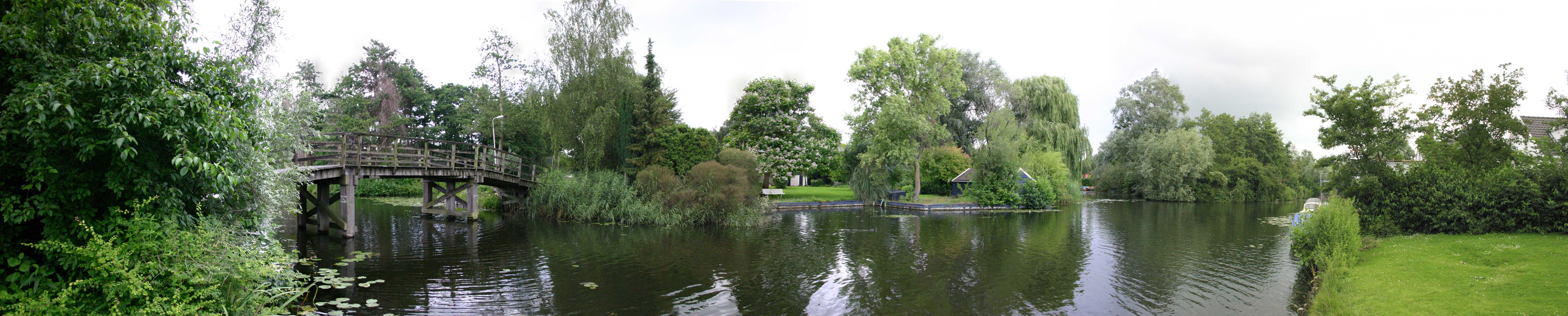
Panoramic view of the Waaltje between Hendrik-Ido-Ambacht and Oostendam. The pedestrian bridge on the left was built in the 1970s.
