= Hendrik-Ido-Ambacht =

- Municipality
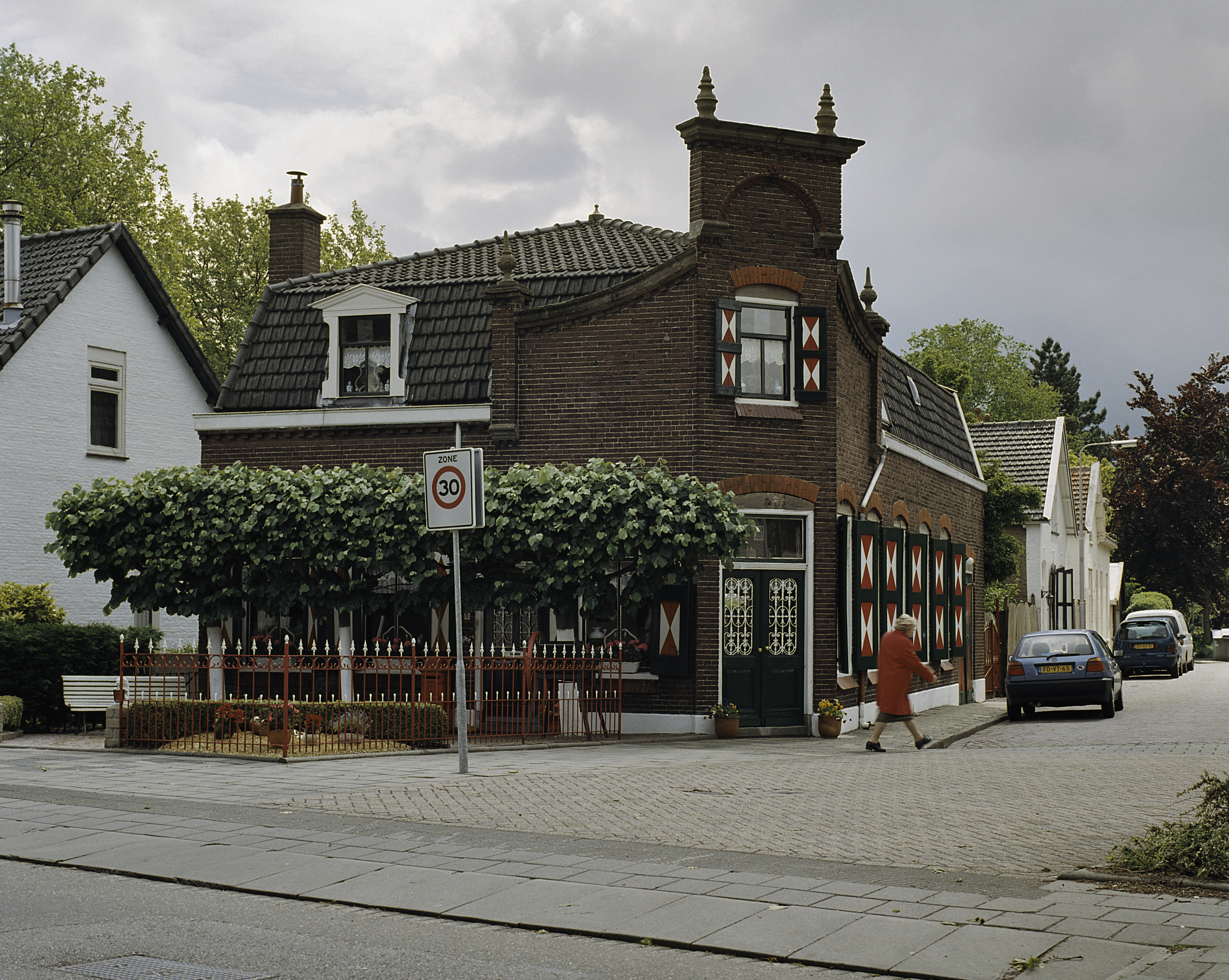
- Typical house in the town.

- Flag Coat of arms

- Location in South Holland
- Coordinates: 51°51′N 4°38′E
- Country: Netherlands
- Province: South Holland

Government
  - Body: Municipal council
  - Mayor: Patrick van der Giessen (No party)

Area
  - Total: 11.90 km^{2} (4.59 sq mi)
  - Land: 10.61 km^{2} (4.10 sq mi)
  - Water: 1.29 km^{2} (0.50 sq mi)
- Elevation: −1 m (−3.3 ft)

Population (January 2021)
  - Total: 31,258
  - Density: 2,946/km^{2} (7,630/sq mi)
- Demonym: Ambachter
- Time zone: UTC+1 (CET)
  - Summer (DST): UTC+2 (CEST)
- Postcode: 3340–3344
- Area code: 078
- Website: www.h-i-ambacht.nl

Hendrik-Ido-Ambacht (Dutch: [ˈɦɛndrɪk ˈidoː ˈɑmbɑxt]) is a town and municipality in the western Netherlands. It is located on the island of IJsselmonde, and borders with Zwijndrecht, Ridderkerk, and the Noord River (with Alblasserdam and Papendrecht on the other side).

The jurisdiction of the municipality covers an area of 11.90 km^{2} (4.59 sq mi) of which 1.29 km^{2} (0.50 sq mi) is water. The municipality comprises no other population centres.

== Name ==
Until 1855, the town was known as Hendrik-Ido-Schildmanskinderen-Ambacht en de Oostendam. Then it merged with Sandelingen-Ambacht and its full name for a period of time was said to be Hendrik-Ido-Oostendam-Schildmanskinderen-Groot-en-Klein-Sandelingen-Ambacht. This used to be the longest name of any town on the mainland of Europe.

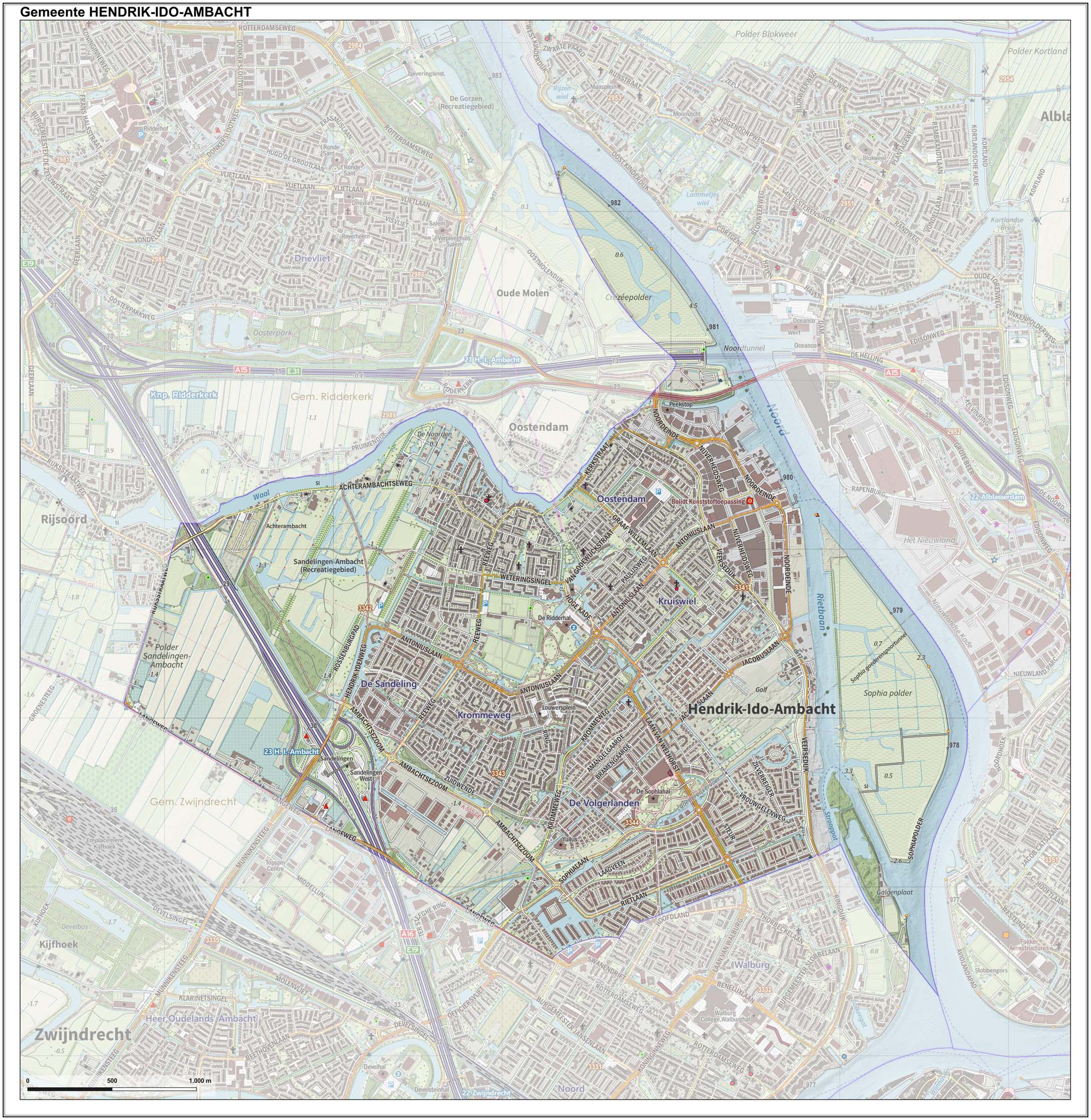
Map of the municipality of Hendrik-Ido-Ambacht, June 2015

== History ==
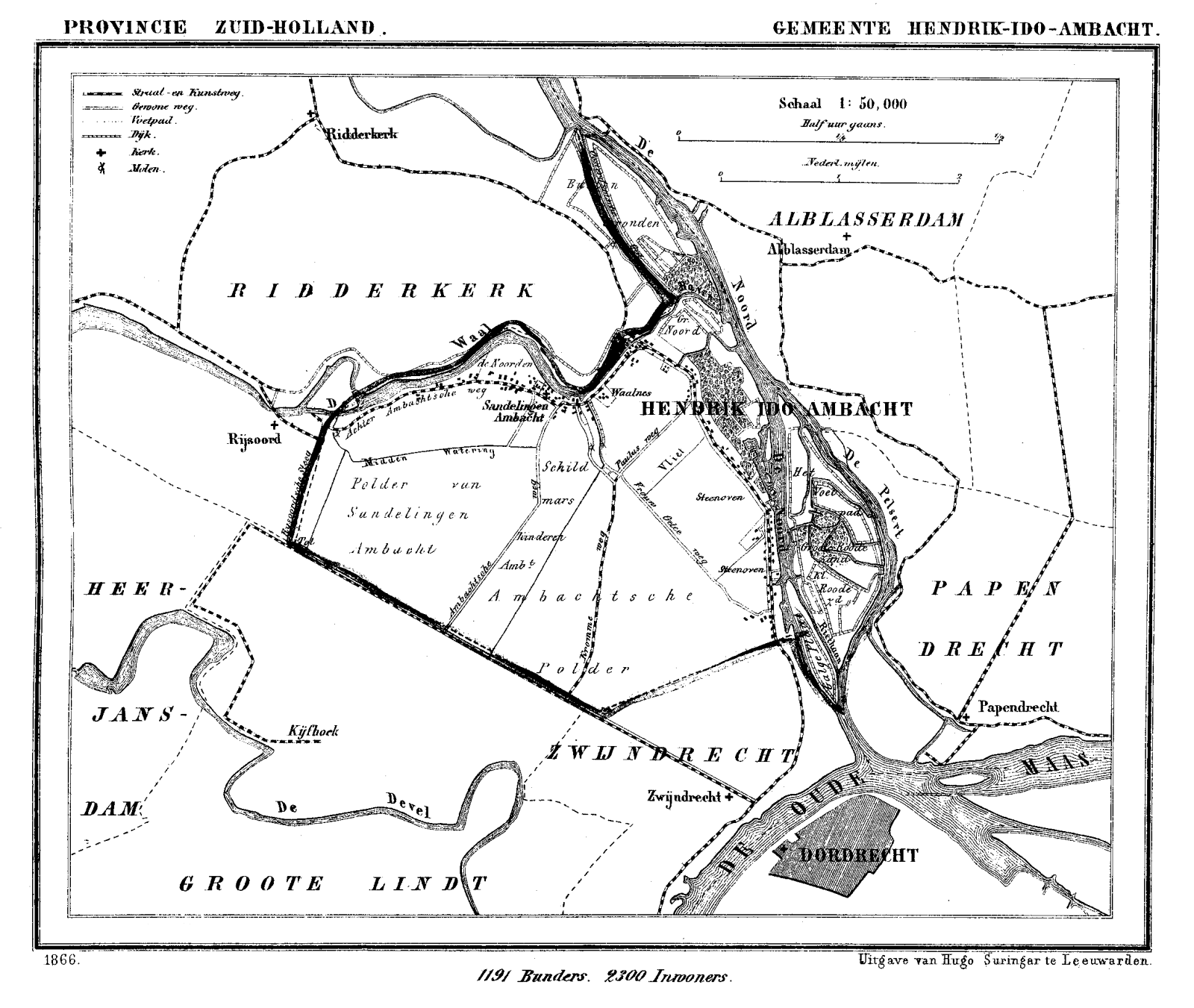
Hendrik-Ido-Ambacht in 1866

The area has been populated from circa the year 1000 CE. Agriculture and animal husbandry were the only means of existence for many centuries. During these days, the land would often get flooded. Most of the land belonged to the Bishop of Utrecht during this period, except Heyenland (later known as Heerjansdam), which belong to Lord Hendrick I van Brederode (1305–1345). In 1323 the abbey sold its land to William III of Holland.

To combat the floods and utilize the lands more productively, William III and Hendrick van Brederode built up a dike around the land and had it dredged in 1332. To fund this endeavor, they sold parts of the lands to wealthy families (who held high public ranks within other cities) offering lordship titles and land ownership in return (as dictated by Zeelandic Laws concerning land ownership). Among these men were Hendrik Ido Wittens and his brother Schiltman Wittens, sons of the municipal executive of Gorinchem, Hendrik Yens Wittens. They received lordship of small pieces of land around the dead arm of the river Wale. The town Hendrik-Ido-Ambacht was made of a fusion of these two lordships. Over the years it expended by annexation and fusion with other lands of different lords.

During the Eighty Years' War some industrial activities began to appear along the river dikes, like stonebakery and shipbuilding. Horticulture and flax growing also developed within the polders.

Because of the rapid industrial growth in iron foundries and shipyards in nearby villages (which produced lots of scrap waste), several families opened up ship breaking yards which grew into an industry resulting in the town becoming worldwide known as the "ship breaking village".

The establishment of industries in the region changed the centuries-old seasonal labour to permanent work opportunities with higher wages. These industries were lost in later times when they moved abroad to lower wage countries. Nowadays the village functions as a commuter town, with its citizens mainly working elsewhere.

Several monumental farms and buildings, including the 14th century Reformed Church, remain as a reminder of its historic past.

== Politics ==
The municipal council of Hendrik-Ido-Ambacht has 23 seats. The Christian parties are strong in Ambacht.

Council seats
Political party	1998	2002	2006	2010	2014	2018	2022	2026
Realistisch Ambacht	–	–	–	–	–	–	2	7
SGP-ChristenUnie	4^{*}	4^{*}	5	6	6	7	7	7
Gemeente Belangen	3	4	3	3	3	5	4	3
CDA	3	4	3	4	3	3	2	2
VVD	4	3	3	3	2	3	3	2
Labour	2^{**}	3^{**}	5	3	2	1	2	1^{**}
D66	1	0	0	1	2	2	2	1
Echt Voor Ambacht	–	–	–	–	–	1	1	0
A.U.B.	–	–	–	1	3	1	0	–
Totals	19	19	19	21	21	23	23	23

* SGP-RPF-GPV.
** Labour-GroenLinks

== Transportation ==
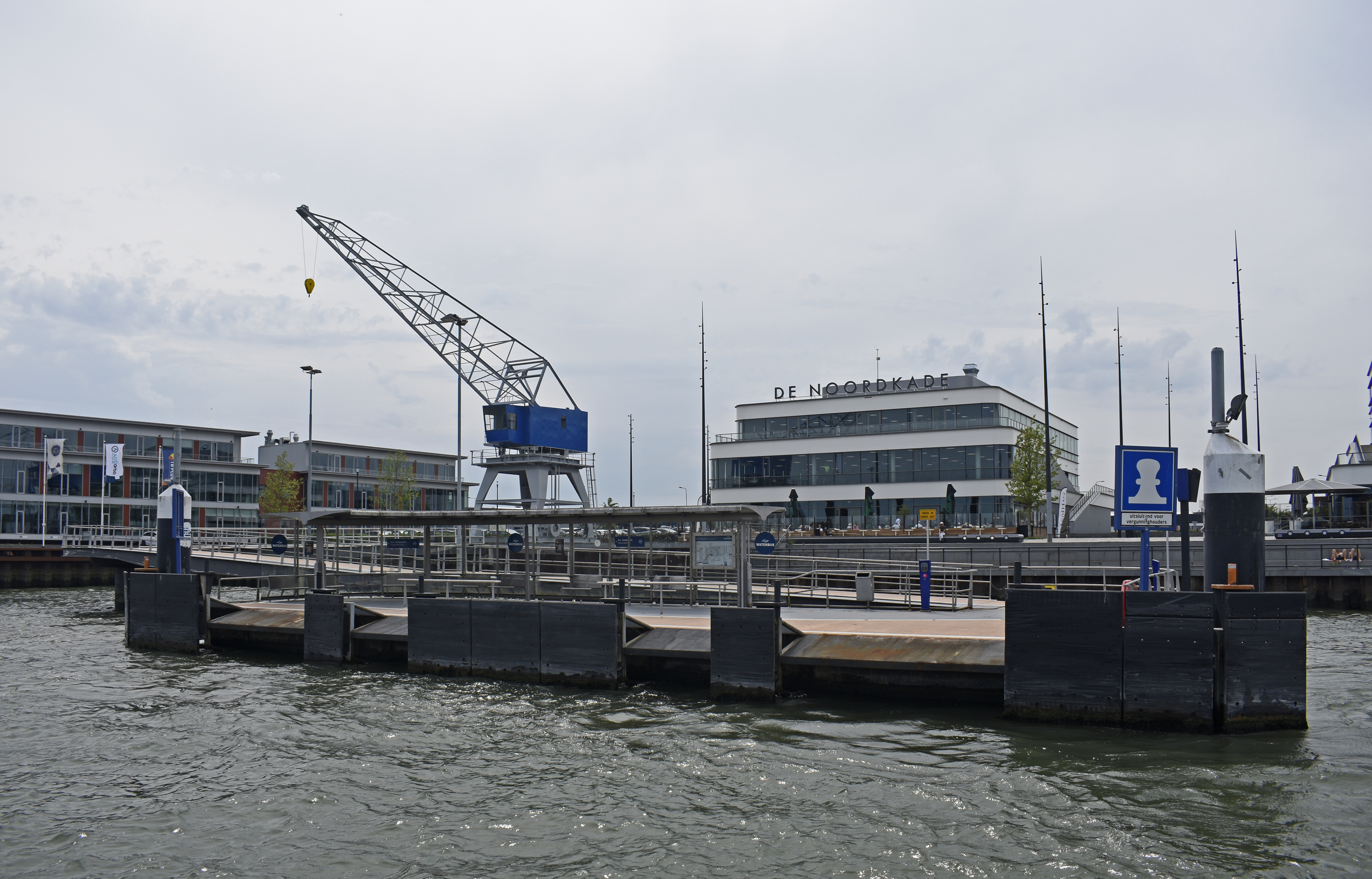
Noordeinde Waterbus stop on the Noord

A segment of A16 motorway lies within the municipality, and exit 23 is called Hendrik-Ido-Ambacht. In addition, a small part of A15 motorway is within the municipality.

The borders of the municipality partially coincide with the Noord River, which is navigable. The waterbus stop Noordeinde provides passenger connections to Rotterdam and Dordrecht.

The closest railway stations are in Zwijndrecht and Dordrecht; both have bus connections with Hendrik-Ido-Ambacht.

== Sister cities ==
- Bergen, Lower Saxony, Germany

== Notable people ==
- Cornelis Ekkart (1892–1975), fencer
- Flor Silvester (1923–2008), graphic designer
- Henk van Lijnschooten (1928–2006), composer
- Bart Berman (born 1938), pianist and composer
- Willem van Hanegem (born 1944), footballer
- Wim Jansen (1946–2022), footballer
- Marco Janssen (born 1969), econometrician
- Roeland Pruijssers (born 1989), chess player
- Wesley Plaisier (born 1990), professional darts player

== Gallery ==
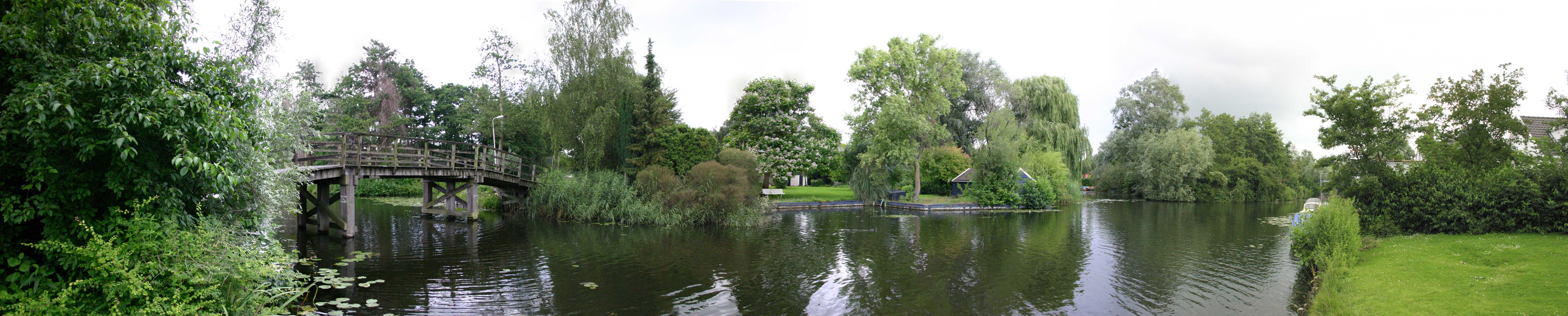
Waaltje
