= Willem Outgertsz Akersloot =

Dutch Golden Age engraver

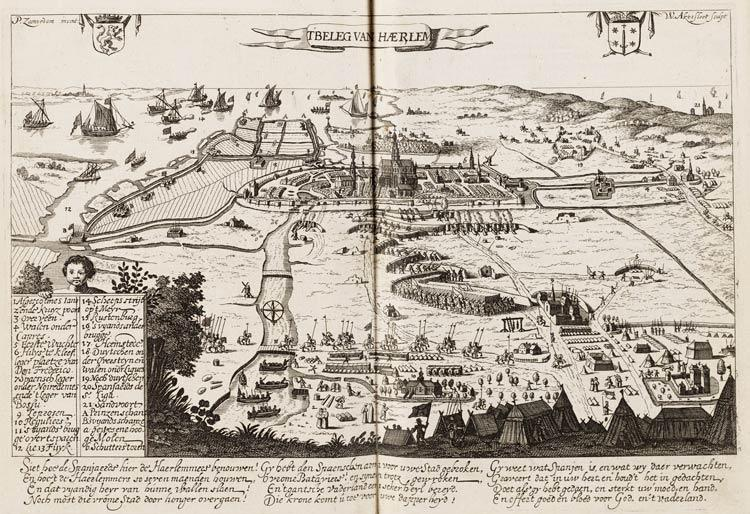
Situation sketch of the Siege of Haarlem (1572-1573), designed in 1628 after Pieter Jansz Saenredam for Samuel Ampzing's "Ode to Haarlem", 1628

Willem Outgertsz. Akersloot (c. 1600 – 1661) was a Dutch Golden Age engraver.

== Biography ==
Akersloot was born in Haarlem. According to the RKD he signed his works with the monogram A in a double square, or with "Akersloot F". He was a pupil of Jan van de Velde and is known for his landscape illustrations engraved after other artists such as Pieter de Molijn, Pieter Saenredam and Adriaen van de Venne. He also worked in Paris in 1620. He was possibly also the pupil of Jacob van der Schuere, whose portrait he engraved. He was the son of Outgert Ariss Akersloot, who signed Salomon de Bray's petition to the city council in 1631 for a new reorganization of the Haarlem Guild of St. Luke. He died in The Hague.
