= IJsselmonde (island) =

Island in the Netherlands

Coordinates: 51°52′N 4°31′E

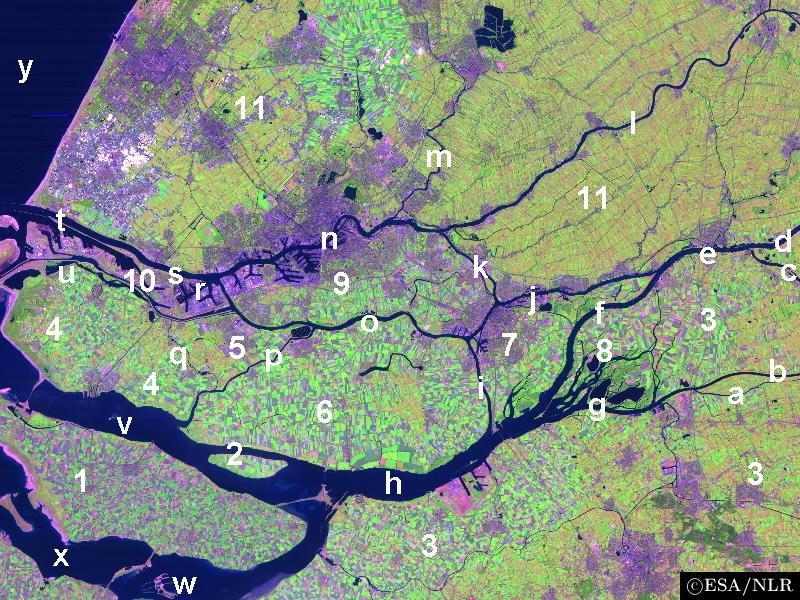
Satellite image of the Rhine-Meuse delta, showing the island of IJsselmonde (9)

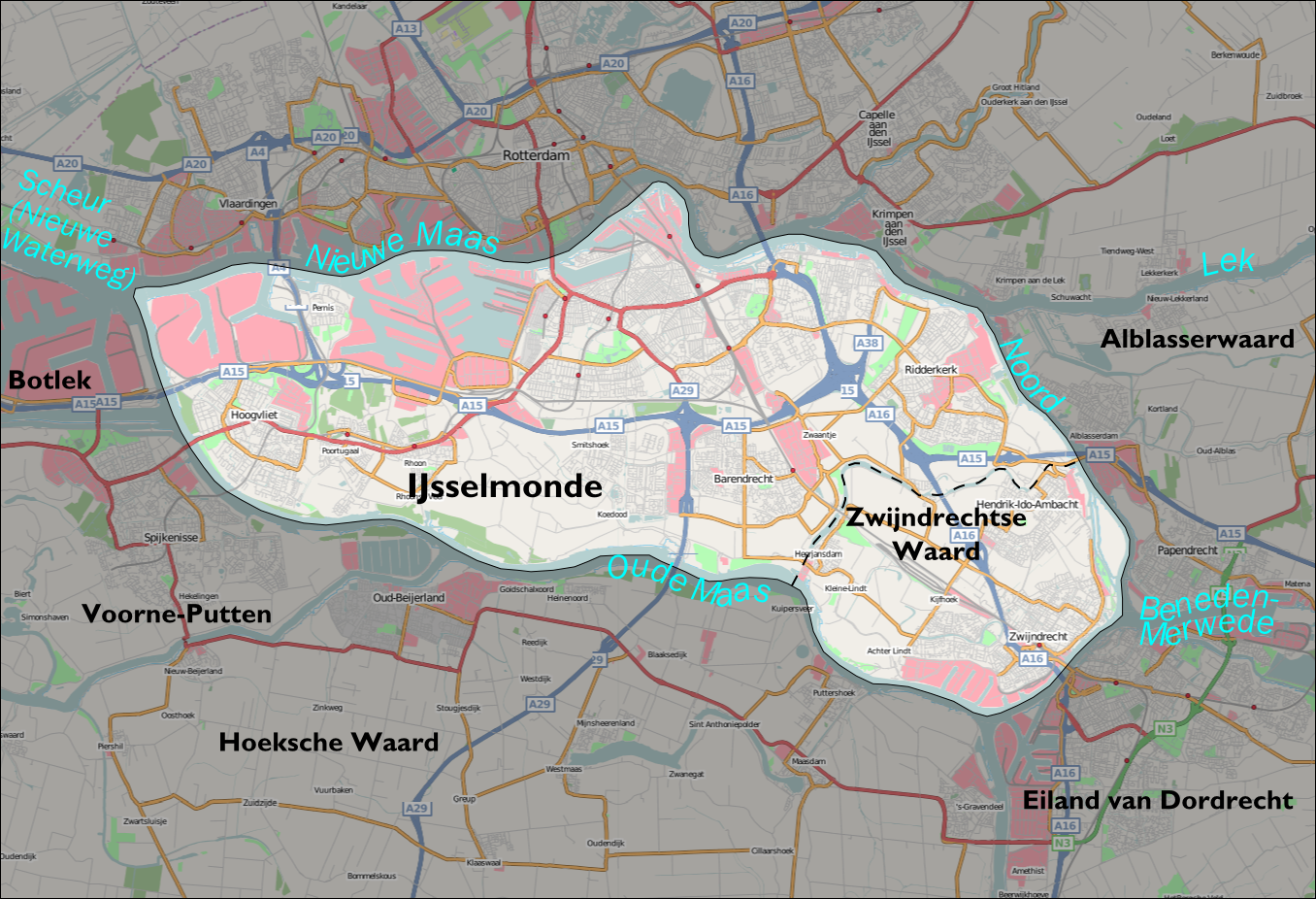
Map of IJsselmonde

IJsselmonde (Dutch pronunciation: [ˌɛisəlˈmɔndə]) is a river island in the Netherlands, between the Nieuwe Maas, Noord and Oude Maas branches rivers of the Rhine-Meuse delta in the province of South Holland. The city of Rotterdam now occupies most of the northern part of the island and includes the eponymous former village of IJsselmonde, once a separate community. The island was once a rich agricultural region but is mostly suburbs today. Only the mid-south parts of the island have retained their agricultural character.

== Boundaries ==
IJsselmonde is separated by these waterways:

- from the mainland on the north by the Nieuwe Maas
- from the island of Putten on the west by the Oude Maas
- from Hoeksche Waard on the south by the Oude Maas
- from the island of Dordrecht on the southeast by the Oude Maas
- from the Alblasserwaard mainland on the east by river Noord

== Municipalities and regions ==
IJsselmonde consists of the following six municipalities:

- Albrandswaard
- Barendrecht
- Hendrik-Ido-Ambacht
- Ridderkerk
- Rotterdam (southern part)
- Zwijndrecht

Albrandswaard, Barendrecht, Ridderkerk and Rotterdam belong to the region of Rijnmond, Hendrik-Ido-Ambacht and Zwijndrecht belong to the region of Zuid-Holland Zuid.

== Zwijndrechtse Waard ==
The Zwijndrechtse Waard, location of the municipalities of Hendrik-Ido-Ambacht and Zwijndrecht and part of the village of Rijsoord (partially), was originally a separate river island, with the western branch of river Waal separating it from IJsselmonde. After the Waal stretch had been closed off at both ends, the Zwijndrechtse Waard is now a section of IJsselmonde. The dammed western end of the Waal river is now commonly referred to as Waaltje ("Little Waal").
