= Outgert Ariss Akersloot =

Dutch Golden Age silversmith

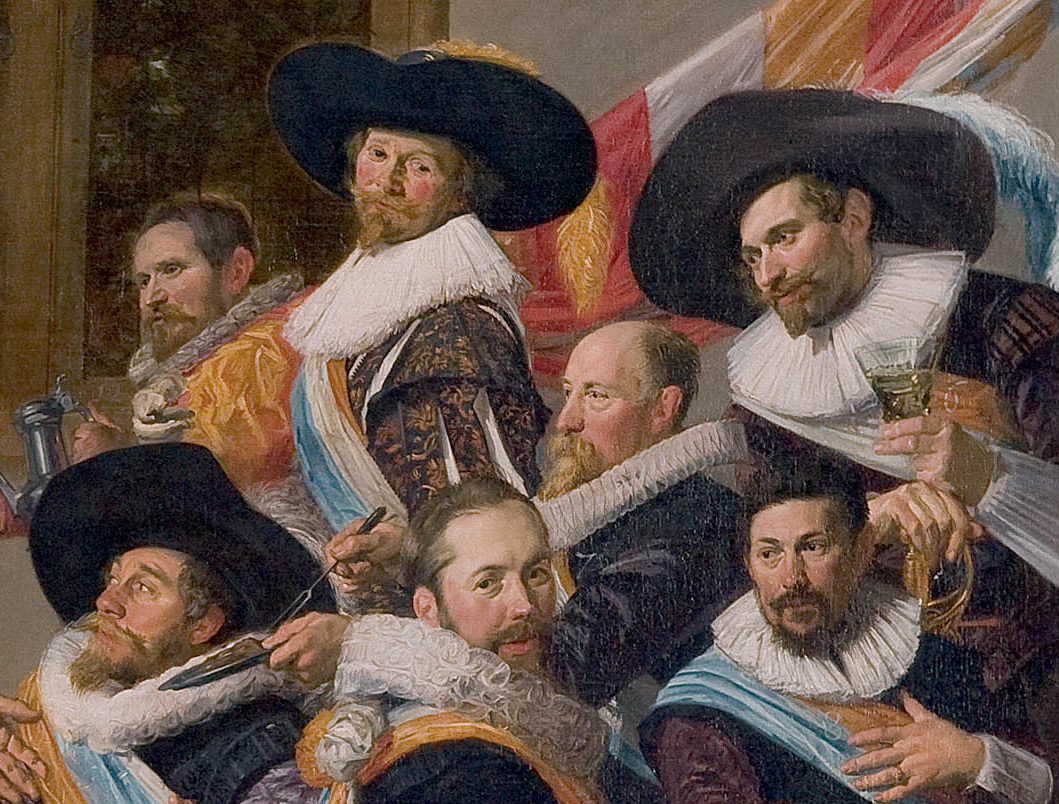
Detail of Hals' 1627 group portrait showing Akersloot as the bald man offering a dish to Johan Damius (only Damius' hand is visible in the lower left)

Outgert Arisz Akersloot (1576–1649), was a Dutch Golden Age silversmith.

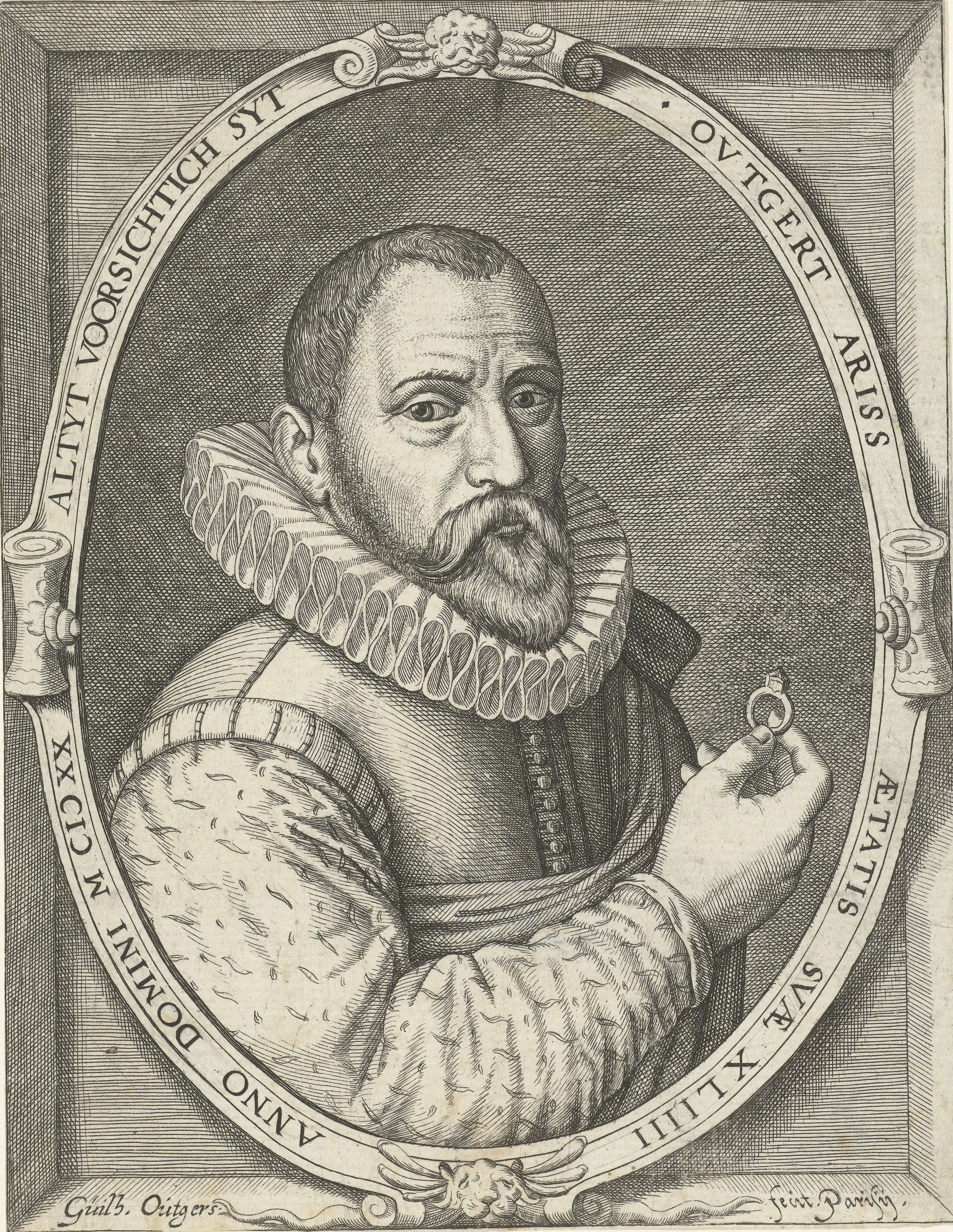
Engraving by Willem

He was a member of the Haarlem regency from 1618 to 1649. From 17 January 1625 to 3 May 1628, he was a member of the Admiralty of Amsterdam. His portrait was painted as Lieutenant of the Haarlem Cluveniers civic guard by Frans Hals in The Banquet of the Officers of the St Adrian Militia Company in 1627.

He became commissioner of the Haarlem Guild of St. Luke in 1631.

His son Willem Outgertsz Akersloot became a printmaker and made an engraving of his father aged 44 in 1620 that shows a bit more hair than he had in 1627.
