= IJsselmonde (village) =

Coordinates: 51°54′N 4°33′E

IJsselmonde (Dutch pronunciation: [ˌɛisəlˈmɔndə]) is a former village in the Dutch province of South Holland. It was located to the east of the city of Rotterdam. The village ("IJssel mouth") derives its name from the river Hollandsche IJssel, which flows into the Nieuwe Maas opposite the village. The village gives its name to the large island it's on, IJsselmonde.

IJsselmonde was a separate municipality until 1941 when it merged with Rotterdam. In the area of the municipality, a large residential area was built, which is now the IJsselmonde borough of Rotterdam.
