= Izaak Reijnders =

Dutch military officer (1879–1966)

General Izaak Reijnders
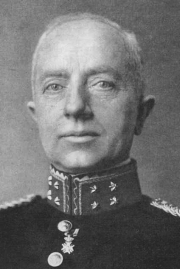

Commander-in-chief of the Armed forces
- In office 28 August 1939 – 6 February 1940
- Preceded by: Vacant (1919-1939); Lieutenant general Willem Frederik Pop
- Succeeded by: General Henri Winkelman

Personal details
- Born: 27 March 1879 Onstwedde, Netherlands
- Died: 13 December 1966 (aged 87) The Hague, Netherlands

Military service
- Allegiance: Netherlands
- Branch/service: Royal Netherlands Army
- Years of service: 1896-1940
- Rank: General

Izaak Herman Reijnders (27 March 1879 – 31 December 1966) was in charge of the Dutch military high command just prior to World War II. He was replaced by Henri Winkelman after Reijnders had had an argument with Defense Minister Adriaan Dijxhoorn who repeatedly went behind his back and conspired to keep from him the authority that was lawfully his during the state of war. During the short German campaign in the Netherlands, May 1940, General Reijnders' predictions about the airborne assault on airfields in Holland, the German breakthrough at Mill, as well as the viability of the IJssel Line and Grebbe Line were proven spot on.
