= Rijsoord =

Coordinates: 51°51′N 4°36′E

Rijsoord Resoord
- Village
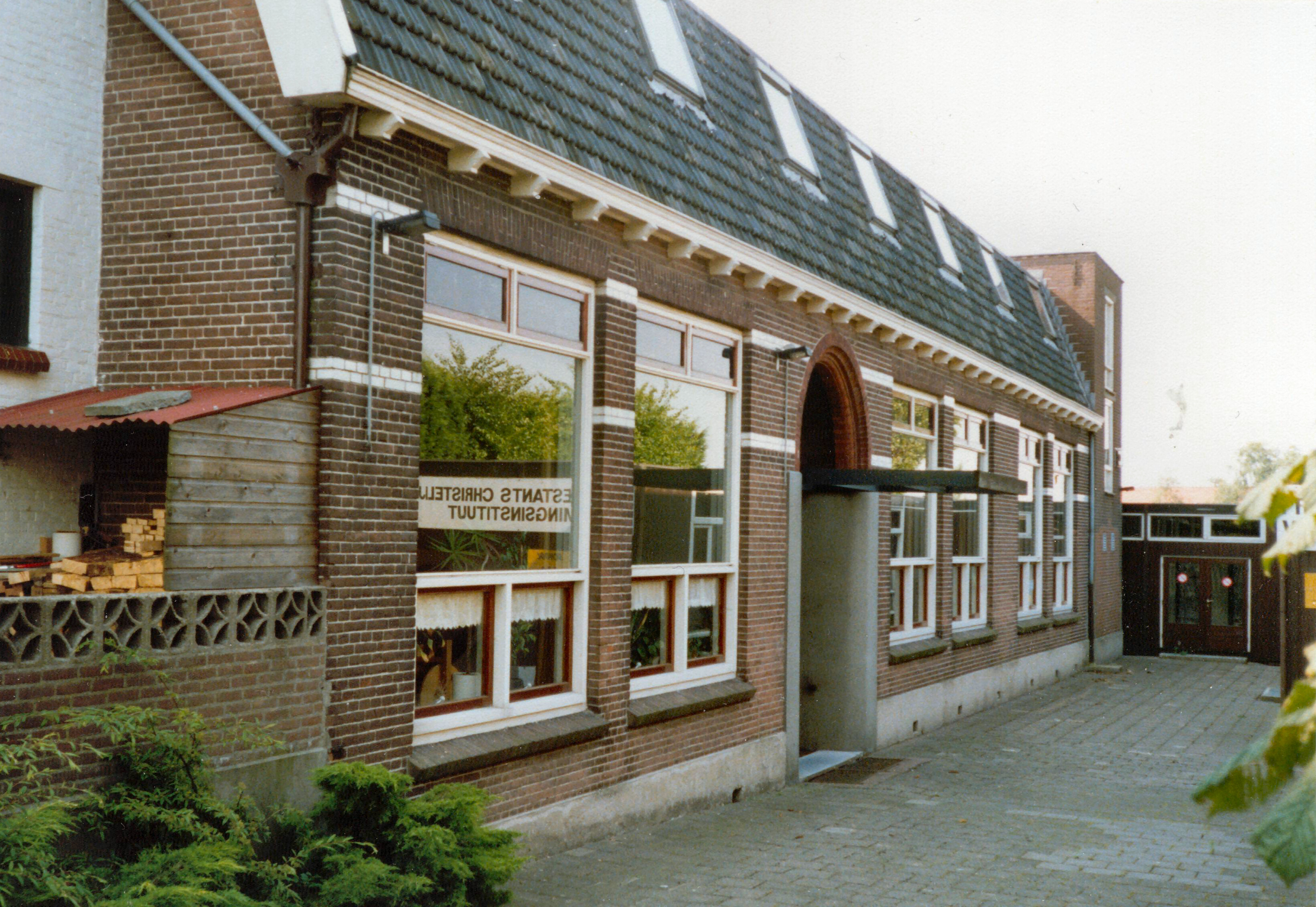
- Rijsoord school where the Dutch surrender was signed.

- Flag Coat of arms

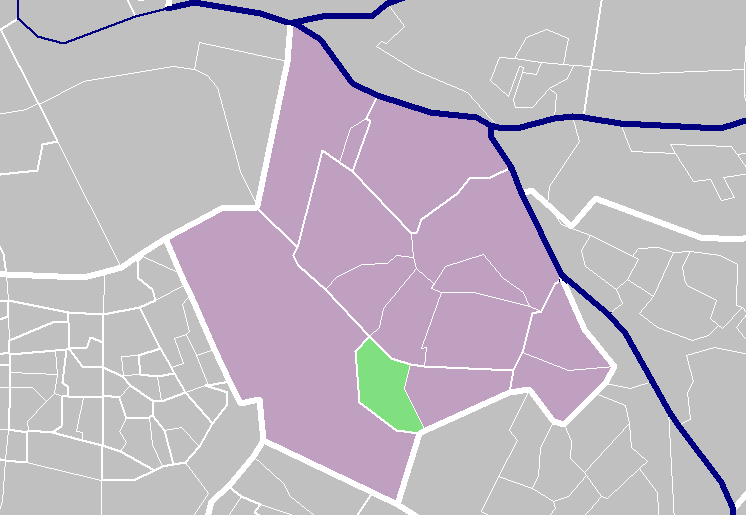
- Country: Netherlands
- Province: South Holland
- Municipality: Ridderkerk

Area
  - Total: 185 ha (460 acres)

Population (2006)
  - Total: 1,359

Rijsoord is a village in the Dutch province of South Holland. It is located about 10 km southeast of the city of Rotterdam, in the municipality of Ridderkerk.

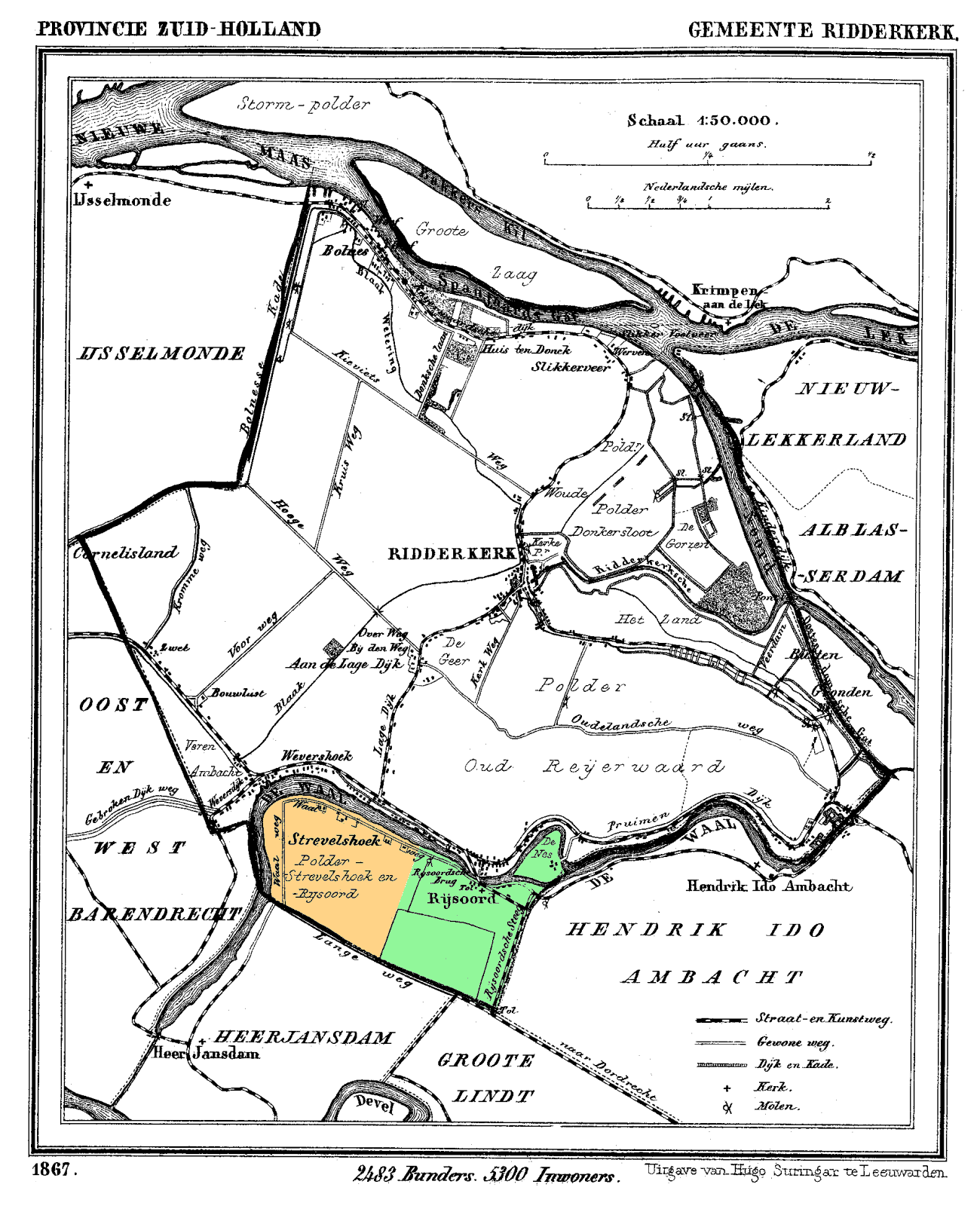
1870 map of Ridderkerk, with the former municipality of Rijsoord highlighted in green; Strevelshoek (part of municipality Rijsoord between 1846 and 1855) in orange.

Rijsoord was a separate municipality until 1855, when it merged with Ridderkerk. Between 1846 and 1855, it was named "Rijsoort en Strevelshoek" after a merger with the smaller municipality of Strevelshoek. The current village is largely located north of the Waaltje (little Waal) river, outside the area of the former municipality.

The village had its day in history on 15 May 1940, when the Dutch Commander-in-Chief General Henri Winkelman had to sign the surrender to the German invaders, after four days of fighting in World War II. The formality took place in a school building in Rijsoord, now a museum.
