= Avenue (landscape) =

Straight path or road with a line of trees or large shrubs on both sides

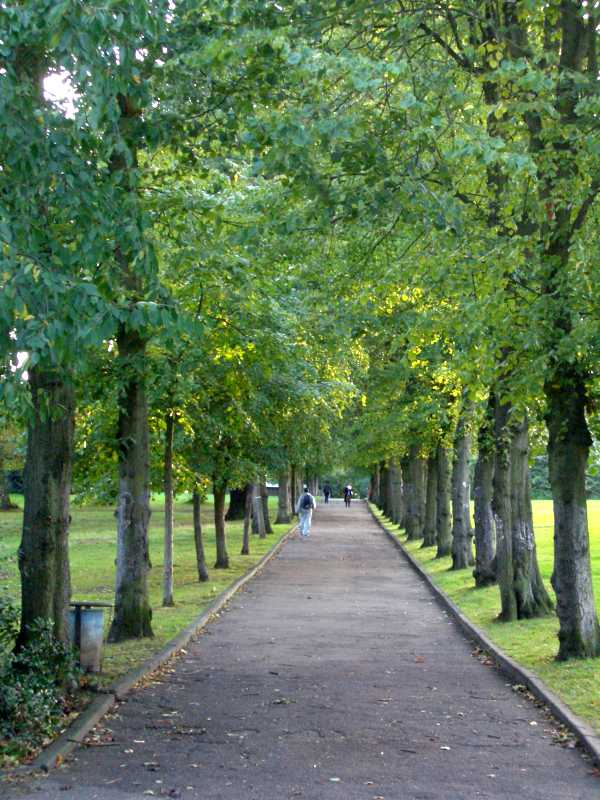
An avenue at Alexandra Park, London

In landscaping, an avenue (from French), alameda (from Portuguese and Spanish), or allée (from French) is a straight path or road that runs between dual rows of trees or large shrubs. As its Latin origin venire ('to come') indicates, an avenue is used to emphasize the "coming to" or arrival at a landscape or architectural feature. In most cases, the trees planted in an avenue will be all of the same species or cultivar, so as to give uniform appearance along the full length of the avenue.

The French term allée is used for avenues planted in parks and landscape gardens, as well as boulevards such as the Grande Allée in Quebec City, Canada, and Karl-Marx-Allee in Berlin.

== History ==
The avenue is one of the oldest implements in the history of gardens. An Avenue of Sphinxes still leads to the tomb of the pharaoh Hatshepsut. Avenues similarly defined by guardian stone lions lead to the Ming tombs in China. British archaeologists have adopted highly specific criteria for "avenues" within the context of British archaeology.

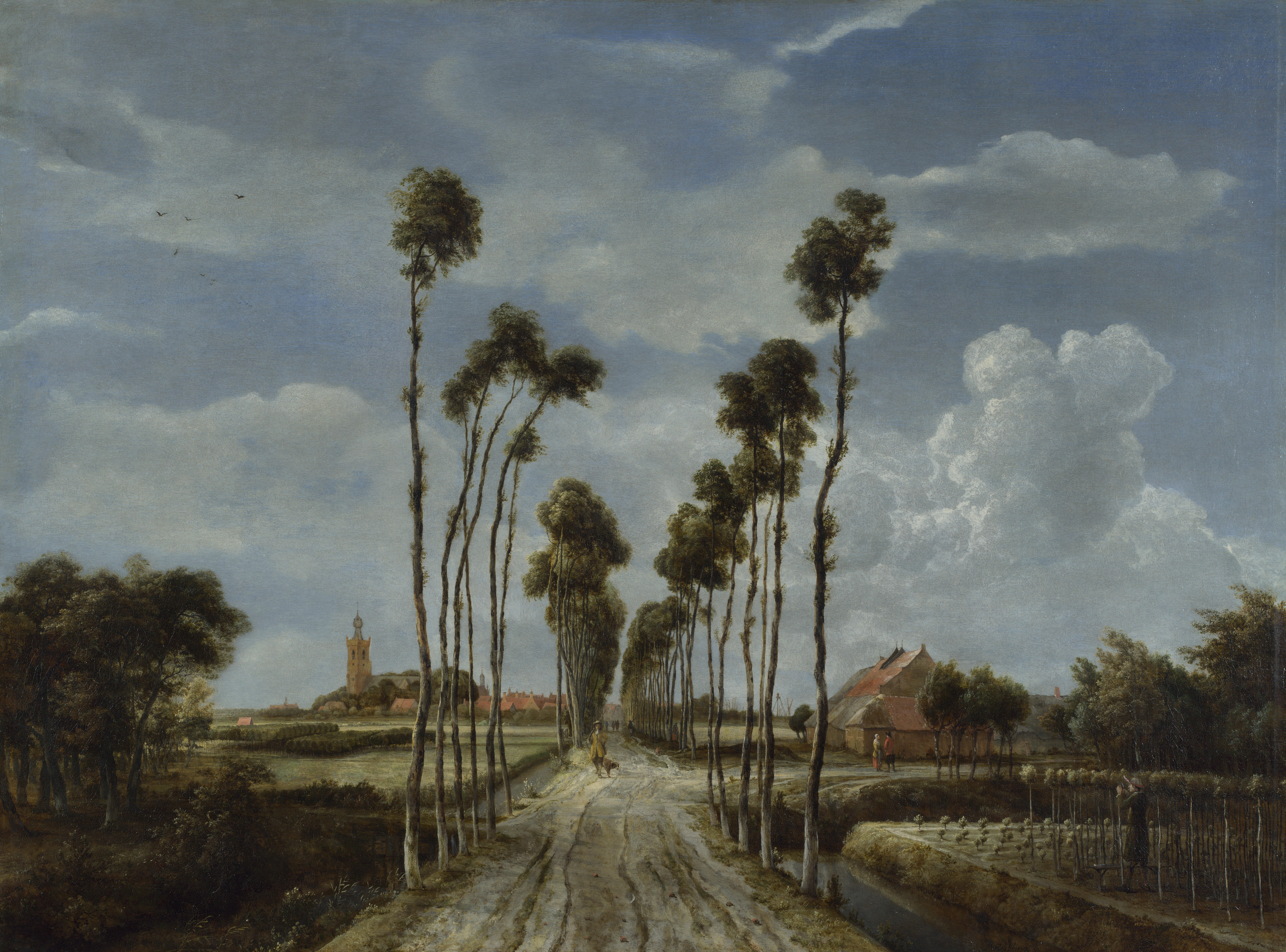
Hobbema's The Avenue at Middelharnis, 1689

In French formal garden Baroque landscape design style, avenues of trees that were centered upon the dwelling radiated across the landscape. See the avenues in the Gardens of Versailles or Het Loo. Other late 17th-century French and Dutch landscapes, in that intensely ordered and flat terrain, fell naturally into avenues; Meindert Hobbema, in The Avenue at Middelharnis (1689) presents such an avenue in farming country, neatly flanked at regular intervals by rows of young trees that have been rigorously limbed up; his central vanishing point mimics the avenue's propensity to draw the spectator forwards along it.

In Austria-Hungary, the fashion for establishing representative avenues appeared as early as the Renaissance and reached its peak in the Baroque period. Avenues lined the access roads to chateaus and manors, as well as pilgrimage routes and Stations of the Cross. The manorial landscape architecture was followed by "folk landscaping" with wayside chapels, crosses and shrines accompanied by trees. Later, Maria Theresa decreed in 1752 to plant trees along the new imperial roads for economic, aesthetic, orientation and safety reasons. Most avenues were created during the reigns of Maria Theresa and Joseph II. At the turn of the 18th and 19th centuries, new landscaping came from England, and formal aesthetics were replaced by the aesthetics of the natural landscape. During Napoleonic wars, pyramidal poplars became a new element, popular due to their fast growth and distinctive shape. Also in the middle of the 19th century, when the construction of imperial roads continued, but at the same time a network of non-state side roads was created, the law ordered the planting of avenues along them, especially fruit trees and mulberries. Many baroque alleys have aged and been felled, and fruit tree alleys have become increasingly popular. At the time of the development of motoring, the oldest avenues often hinder the widening and modernization of rural roads and are the subject of dispute between conservationists and traffic safety requirements.

== Design ==
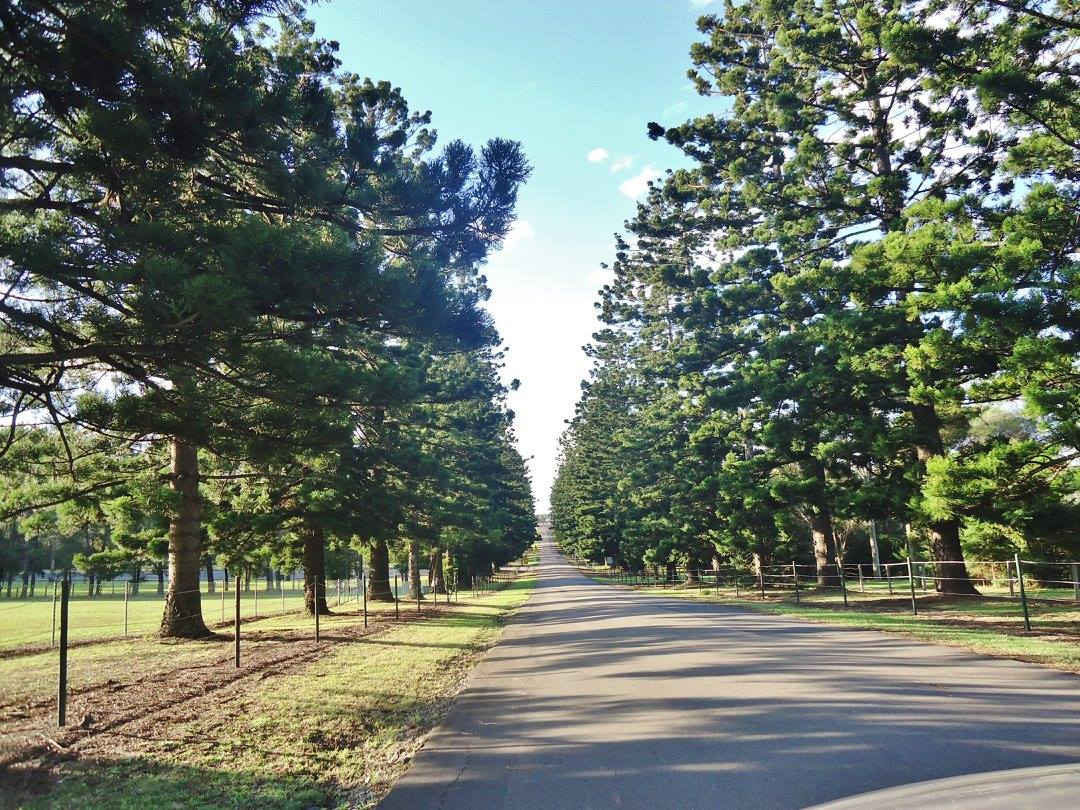
An avenue of hoop pines in Sydney, Australia

To enhance the approach to mansions or manor houses, avenues were planted along the entrance drive. Sometimes the avenues are in double rows on each side of a road. Trees preferred for avenues were selected for their height and speed of growth, such as poplar, beech, lime, and horse chestnut.

Sometimes tree avenues were designed to direct the eye toward some distinctive architectural building or feature, such as a chapels, gazebos, or architectural follies.

== Street name ==
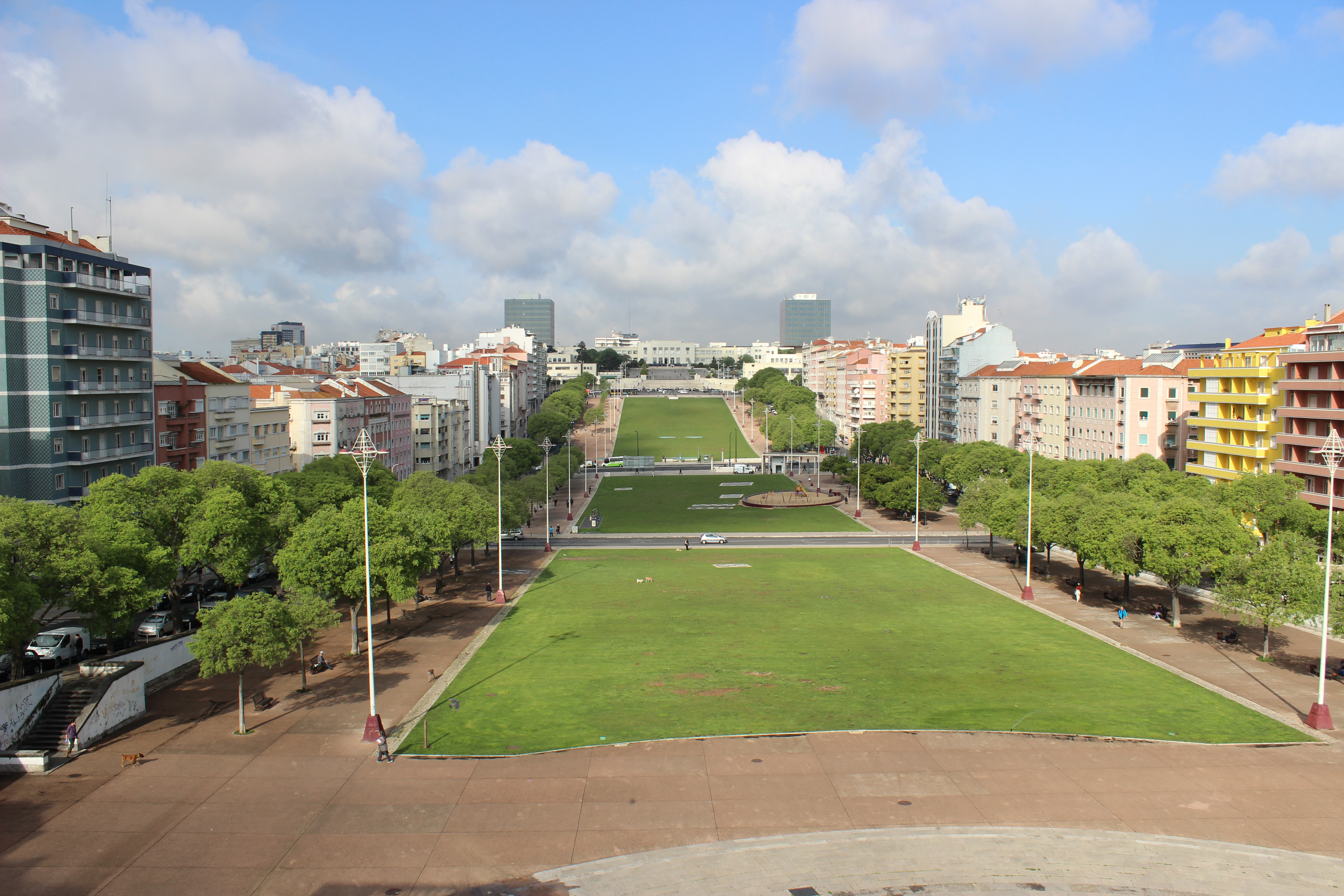
Alameda Dom Afonso Henriques in Lisbon, Portugal

=== Origin ===
Avenue as a street name in French, Spanish (avenida) and other languages implies a large straight street in a city, often created as part of a large scheme of urban planning such as Baron Haussmann's remodelling of Paris or the L'Enfant Plan for Washington D.C.; "avenues" will typically be the main roads. This pattern is very often followed in the United States, indeed all the Americas, but in the United Kingdom this sense is less strong and the name is used more randomly, mostly for suburban streets developed in the 20th century, though Western and Eastern Avenues in London are main traffic arteries out of the city, if not very straight.

=== Cities ===
In cities which have a grid-based naming system, such as the borough of Manhattan in New York City, there may be a convention that the streets called avenues run parallel in one direction – roughly north–south in the case of Manhattan – while "streets" run at 90 degrees to them across the avenues; roughly east–west in Manhattan. In Washington, DC the avenues radiate from the centre running diagonally across the grid of streets, which follows typical French usage of the name (in France "boulevards" are often main roads running round the city centre). In Phoenix, Arizona, "the avenues" can colloquially mean "the west side of town", due to the numbered north–south-running roads being called "Avenues" in the western part of the city, separated from the eastern "Streets" by a "Central Avenue". Similarly, "the avenues" in San Francisco, California refers to the Richmond District and the Sunset District, the two neighborhoods on the Pacific coast, north and south of Golden Gate Park, respectively.

In Anglophone urban or suburban settings, "avenue" is one of the usual suite of words used in street names, along with "boulevard", "circle", "court", "drive", "lane", "place", "road", "street", "terrace", "way", "gate" and so on, any of which may carry connotations as to the street's size, importance, or function. Avenues were usually lined with trees when first built, although many avenues have lost their trees to make way for overhead wiring, parking or to allow light into properties.

== Notable avenues ==
Avenue des Champs-Élysées, Paris, France

- Avenida 9 de Julio, Buenos Aires, Argentina
- Avenida da Liberdade, Lisbon, Portugal
- Avenue des Champs-Élysées, Paris, France
- Epifanio de los Santos Avenue (EDSA), Metro Manila, Philippines
- Fifth Avenue, Manhattan, New York City, United States
- Holland Park Avenue, London, United Kingdom
- Kurfürstendamm (Ku'Damm), Berlin, Germany
- La Brea Avenue, Los Angeles, California, United States
- Madison Avenue, Manhattan, New York City, United States
- Michigan Avenue, Chicago, Illinois, United States
- Park Avenue, Manhattan and the Bronx, New York City, United States
- Paseo de la Reforma, Mexico City, Mexico
- Paseo del Prado, Madrid, Spain
- Paulista Avenue, São Paulo, Brazil
- Midōsuji, Osaka, Japan

== Gallery ==
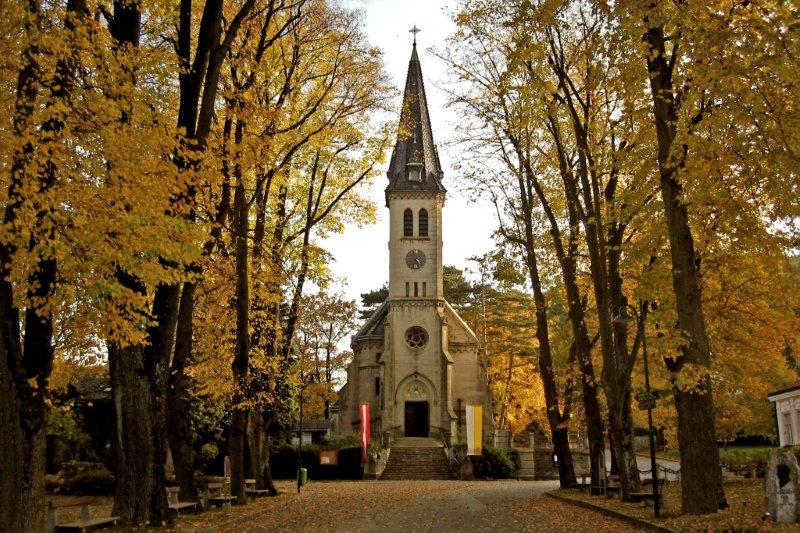
An avenue at Weissenbach an der Triesting, Austria

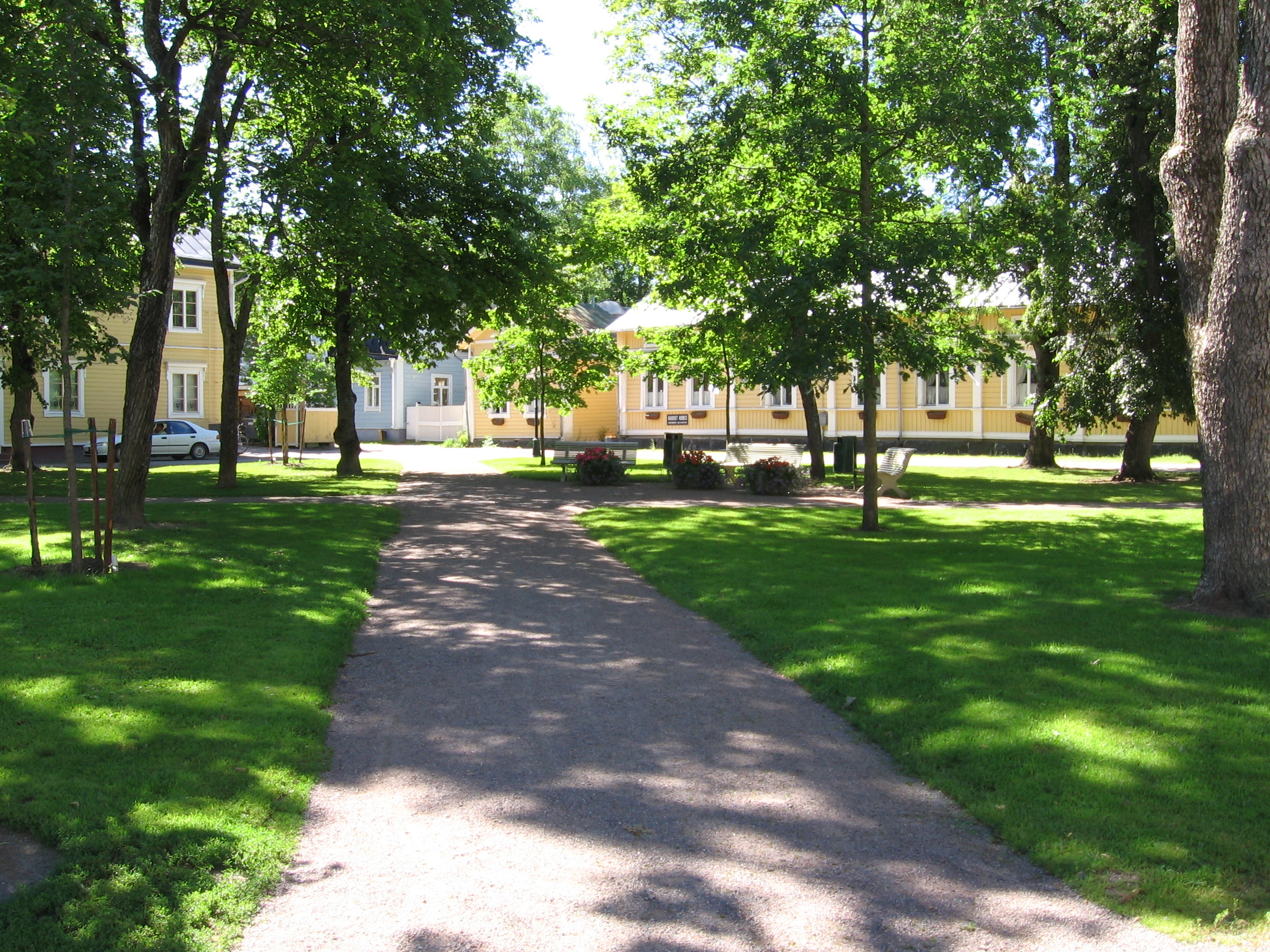
A park avenue in the old town of Naantali, Finland

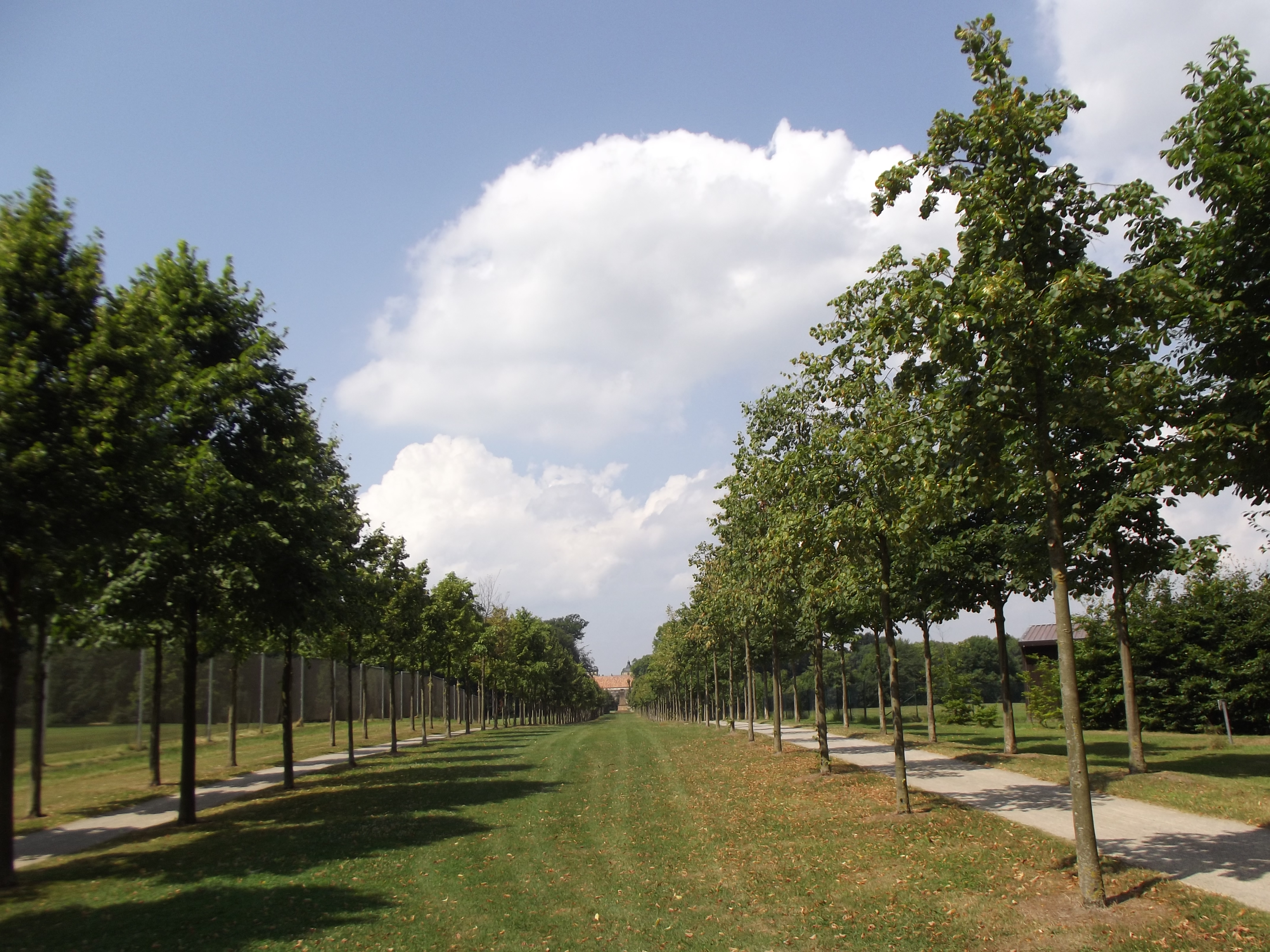
Old Avenue Steinfurter Bagno leading to the local castle in the background, used as twofold bicycle path

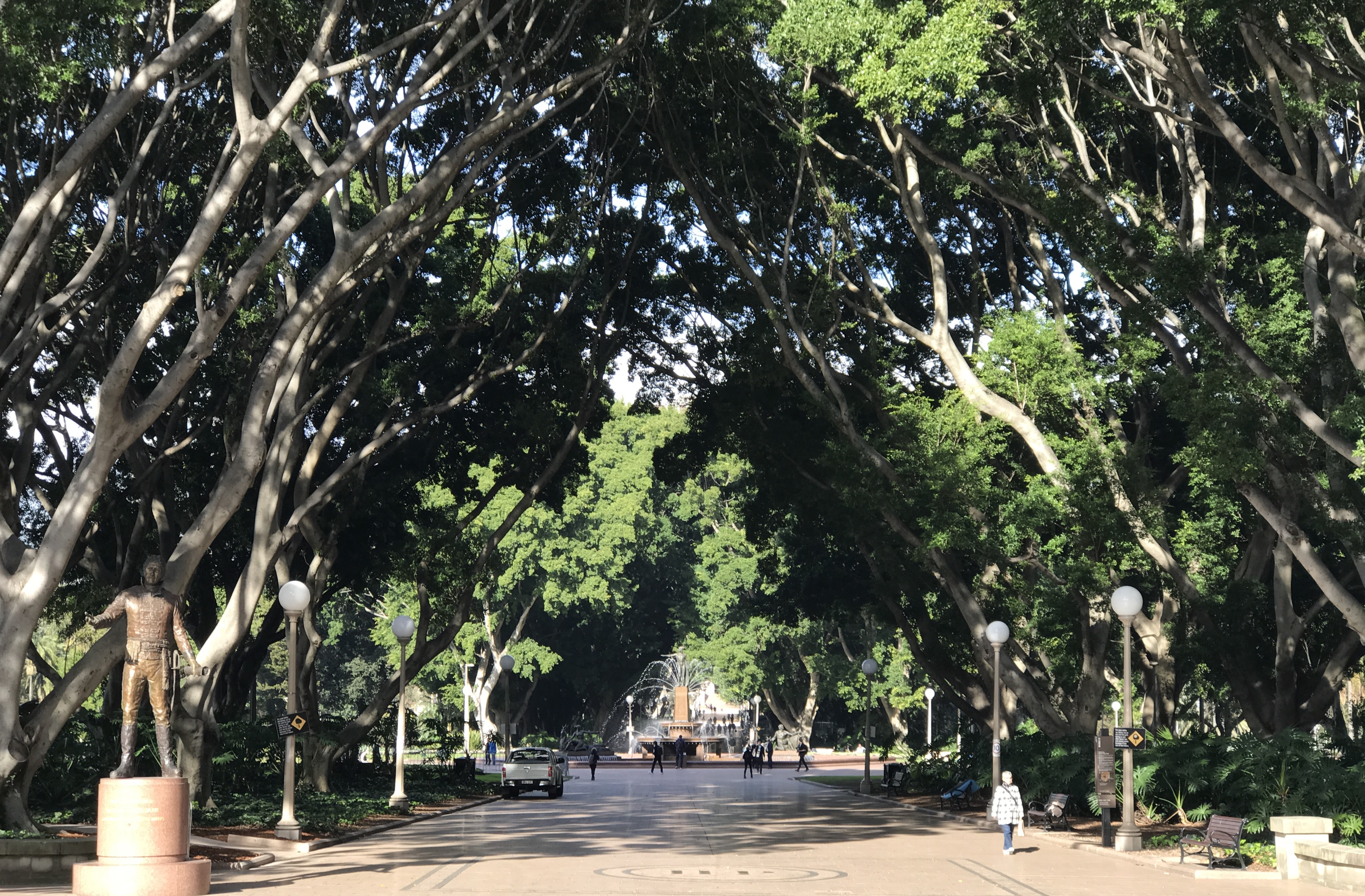
Fig avenue in Hyde Park, Sydney

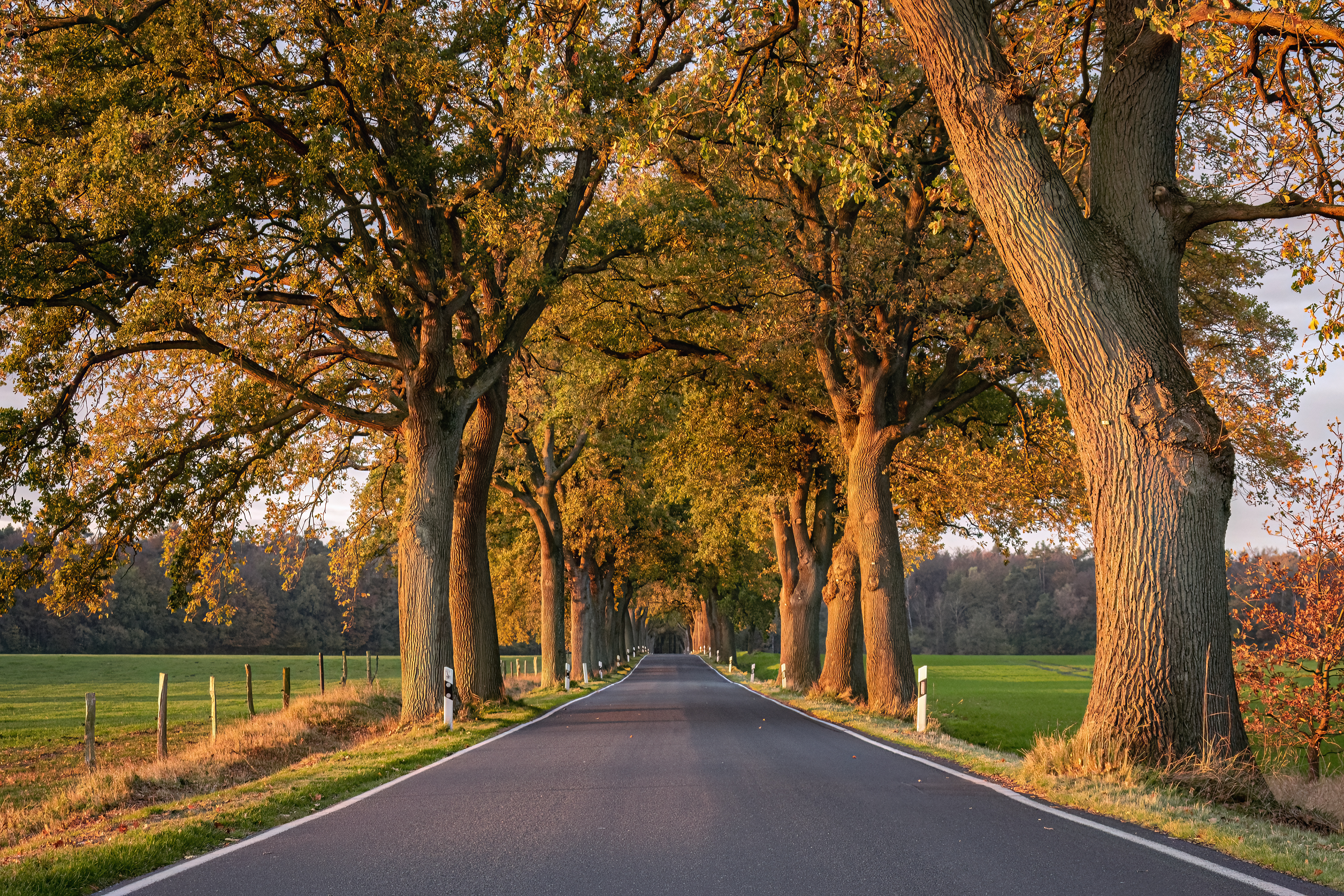
A German country road designed as an avenue

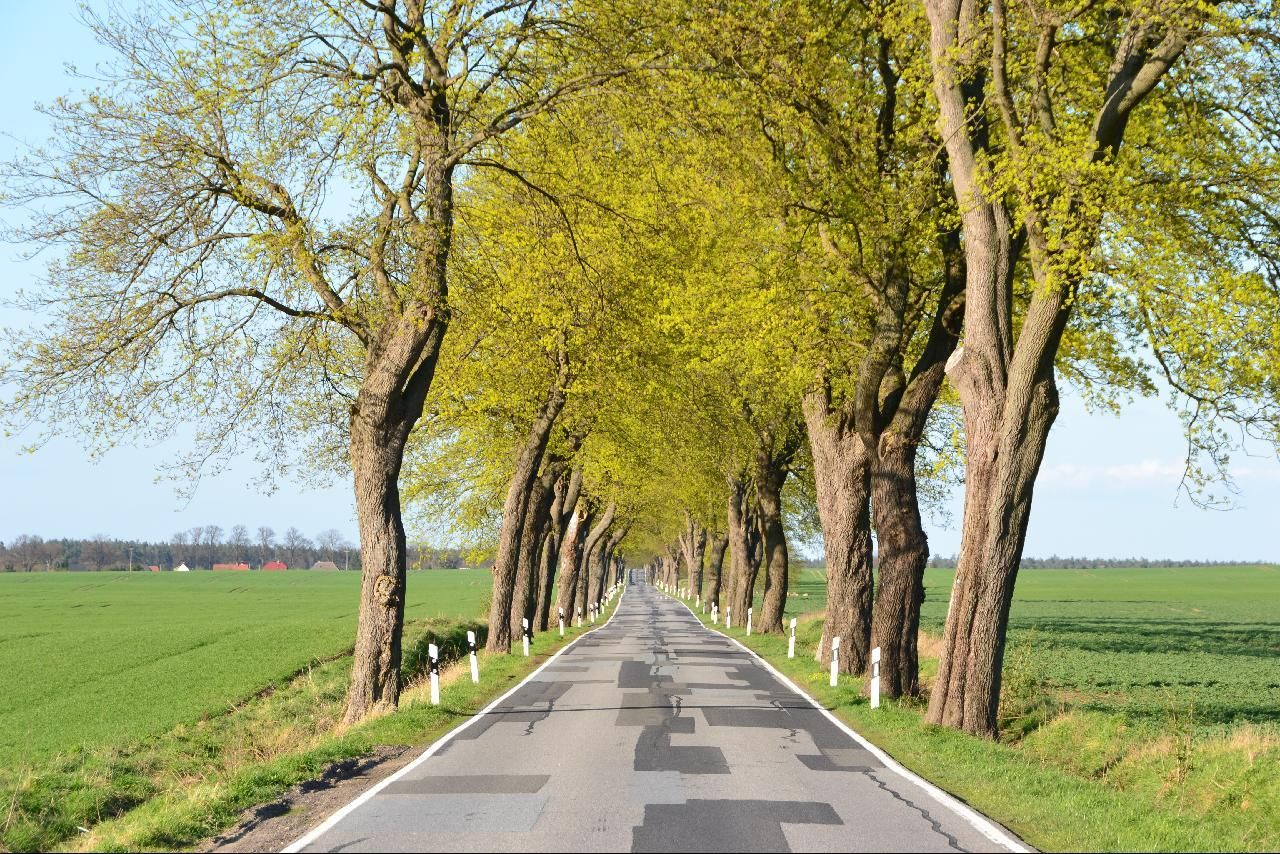
Country road as an avenue in Germany

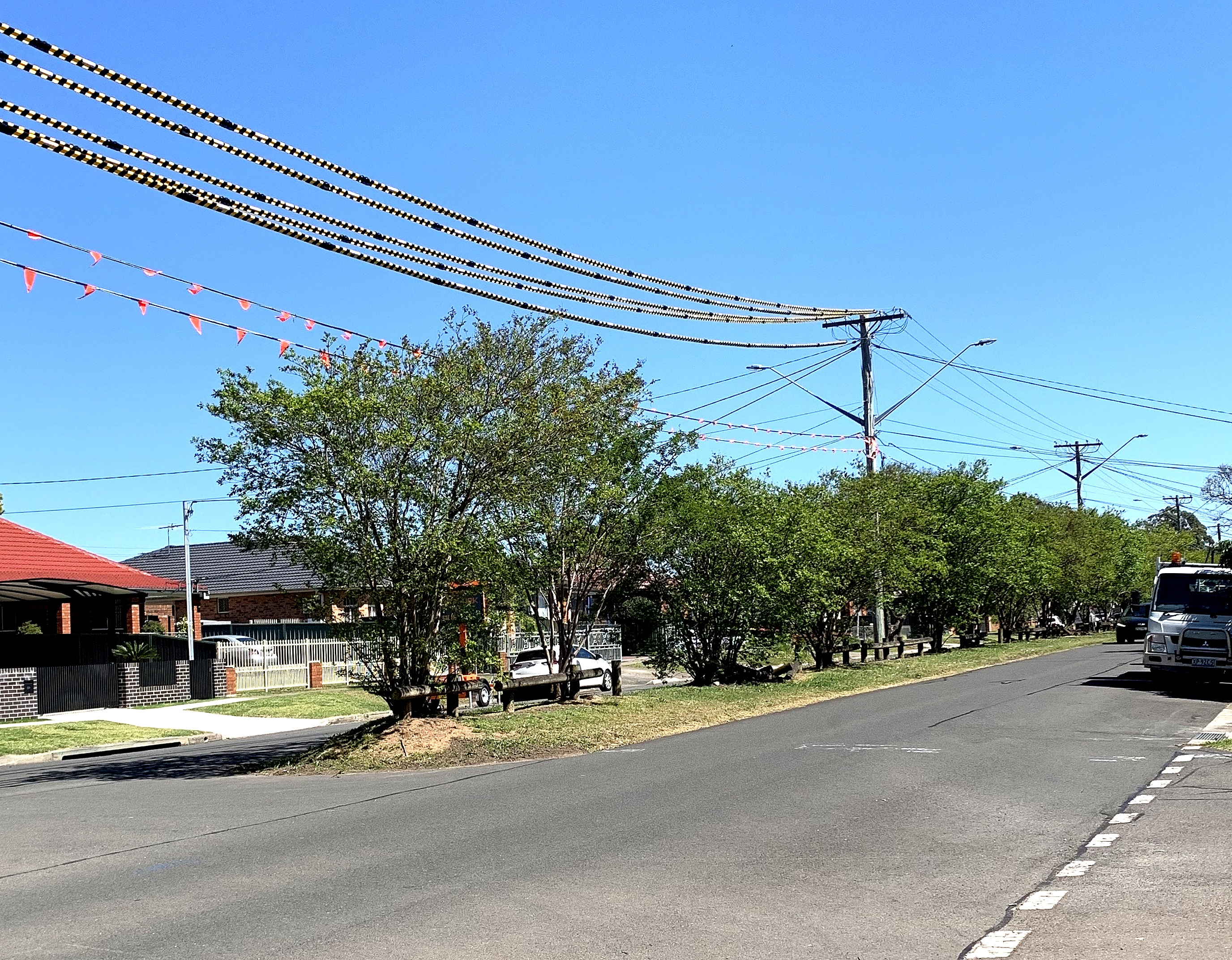
A suburban avenue at Fairfield, New South Wales, Australia

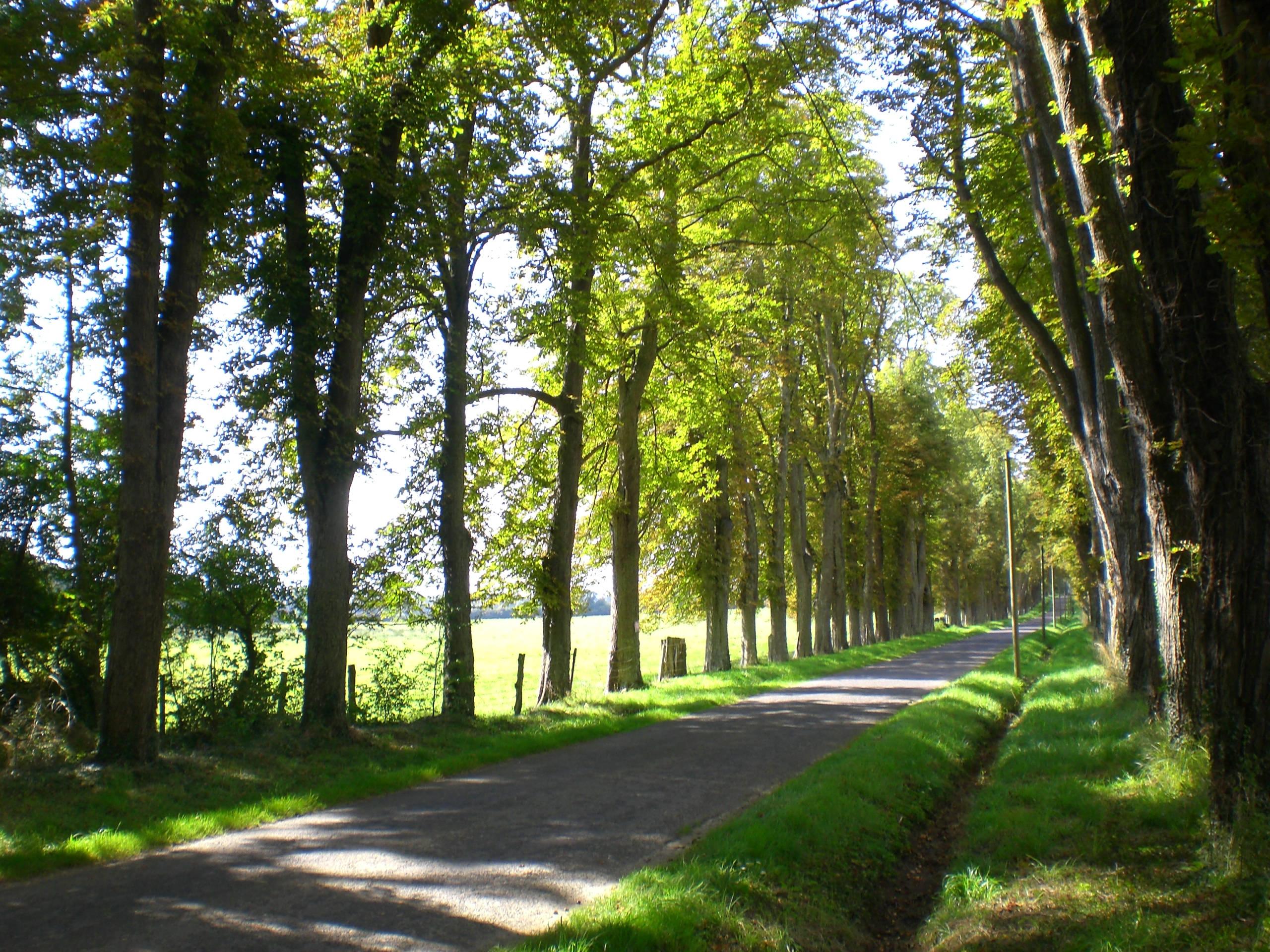
Tree avenue in Normandy, France

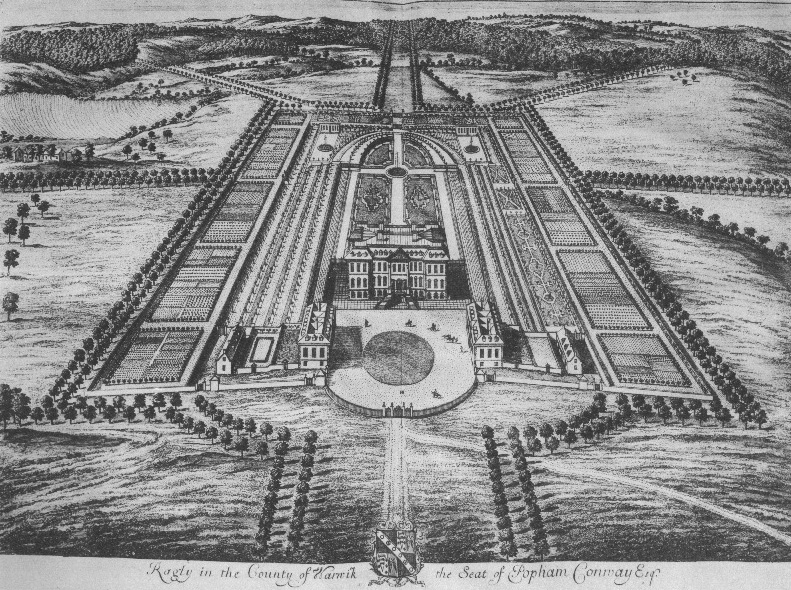
Avenues around and radiating from, Ragley Hall, 1710s, by Johannes Kip

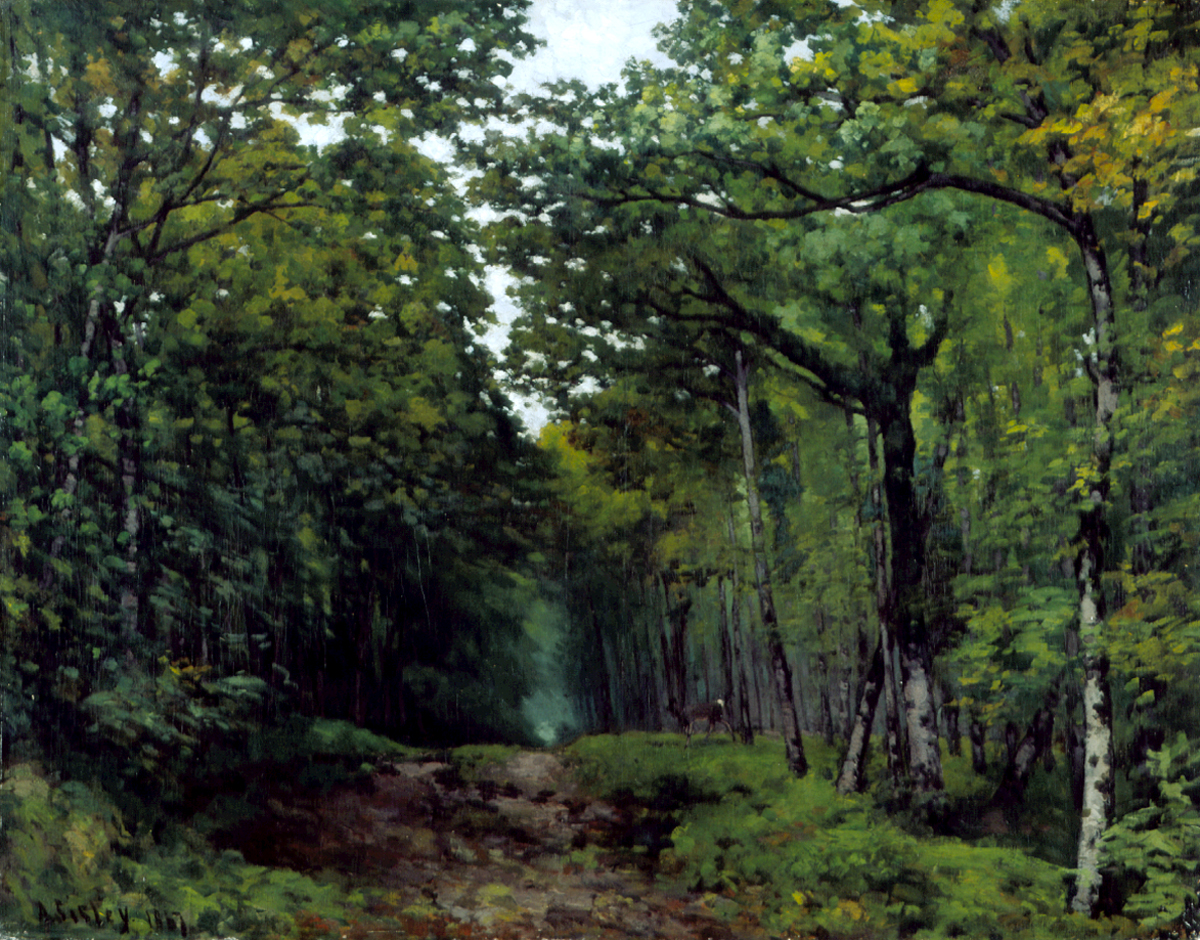
Avenue of Chestnut Trees near La Celle-Saint-Cloud by Alfred Sisley, 1867

== See also ==
- Alley — a narrow lane, or path
- Avenue of honour
- Garden design
- Hedges
- Shade tree
- Grove
- Boulevard
