= The Avenue at Middelharnis =

1689 Dutch Golden Age painting by Meindert Hobbema

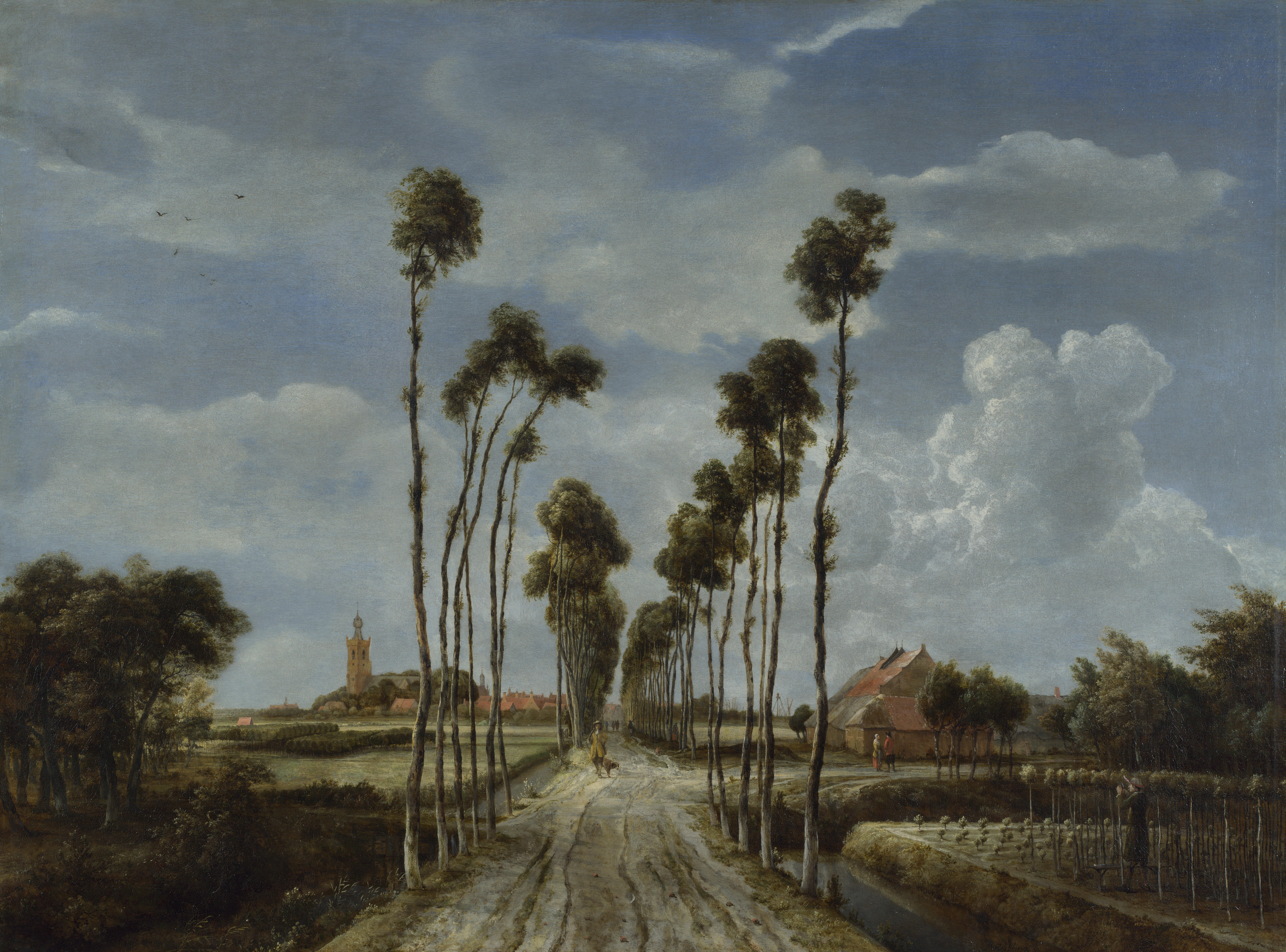
The Avenue at Middelharnis by Meindert Hobbema, 1689, 103.5 × 141 cm. National Gallery, London

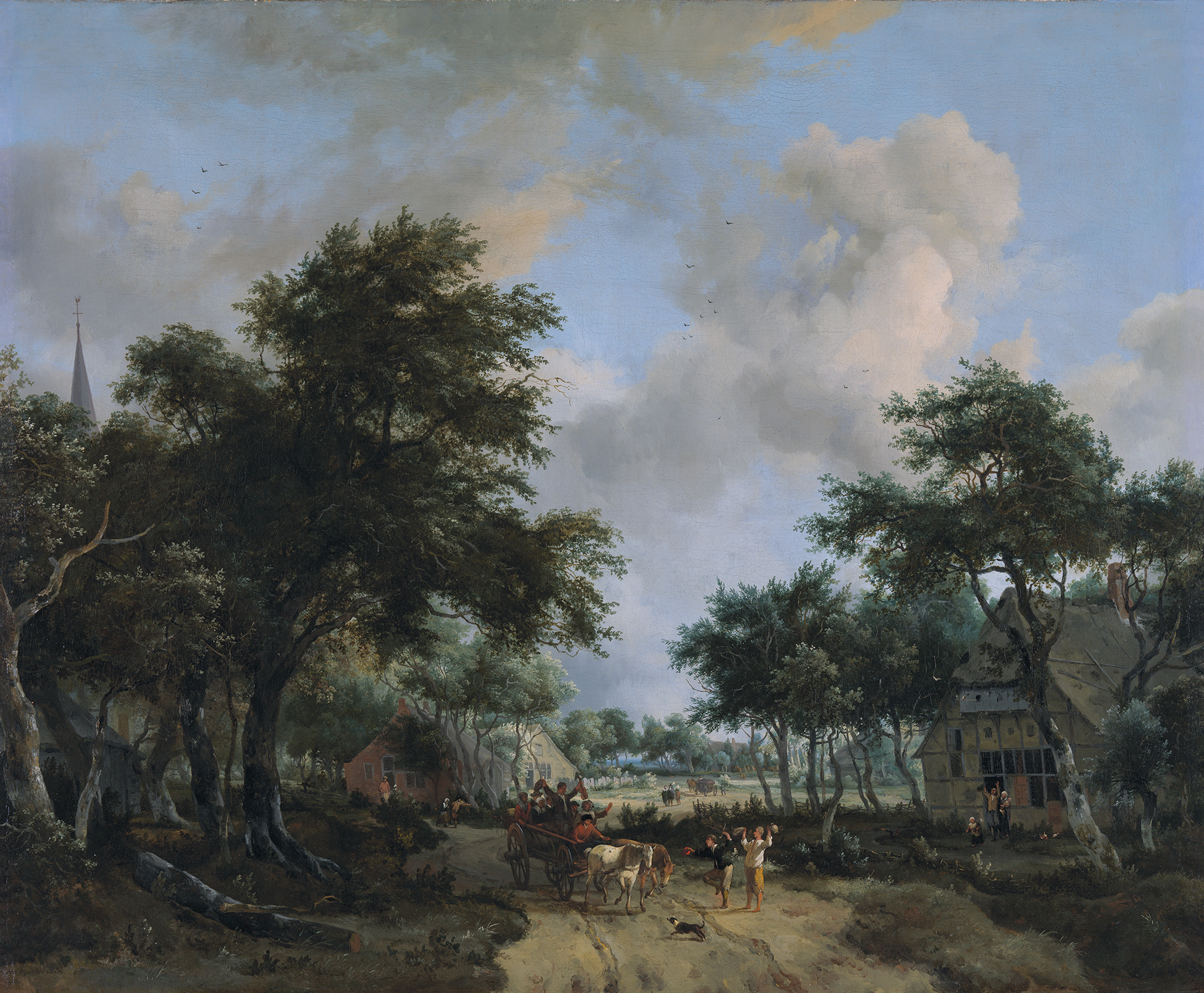
A more typical Hobbema, Forest landscape with a merry company in a cart, Rijksmuseum, c. 1665

The Avenue at Middelharnis is a Dutch Golden Age painting of 1689 by Meindert Hobbema, now in the National Gallery, London. It is in oil on canvas and measures 103.5 by 141 centimetres (40.7 in × 55.5 in). It shows a road leading to the village of Middelharnis on the island of Goeree-Overflakkee in the Meuse (Dutch: Maas) delta in South Holland, the Netherlands.

The painting has long been one of the best-known Dutch landscape paintings, and certainly Hobbema's best-known work, at least in the English-speaking world: "it is as if the artist had produced only a single picture" according to Christopher Lloyd. Cornelis Hofstede de Groot, the great specialist of a century ago, thought it "the finest picture, next to Rembrandt's Syndics, which has been painted in Holland". According to Michael Levey, "it occupies a position in painting somewhat equivalent to that in poetry of Gray's Elegy, and for Seymour Slive "it is the swan song of Holland's great period of landscape painting which fully deserves its high reputation." For Gerald Reitlinger, it "soars above the other nine National Gallery Hobbemas".

The untypically symmetrical and frontal composition of the painting appears to record very accurately the view Hobbema saw; the alder trees along the road were planted in 1664. It is signed and dated in the reflection on the ditch at right: "M:hobbema/f 1689", over twenty years after Hobbema largely gave up painting, and right at the end of the Dutch Golden Age landscape period.

== Description ==
The village is seen from the south-east. The road was called the Boomgaardweg, but is now the Steene Weg, or Steneweg. The top of the church tower has been rebuilt, and the spire was removed by the French in 1811 to make a semaphore station, connecting The Hague with Paris. The smaller tower to the right of the church, seen between the trees, is the town hall, built in 1639, and the barn to the right survived until the 1870s.

The village lies on the edge of the island and was a fishing port; ships' masts and a beacon with a tripod support can be seen in the distance to the right of the avenue, on the beach facing the Haringvliet. This was then a salt-water channel, but has been dammed and turned into a fresh-water lake in modern times. The island was detached from the mainland when the Haringvliet formed as a result of two major flooding events. The first was in 1216, which breached the dunes of Voorne and created a deep saltwater inlet. In the St. Elizabeth floods of 1421, this inlet connected to the Merwede and became an important estuary of the Rhine and Meuse rivers.

== Context ==
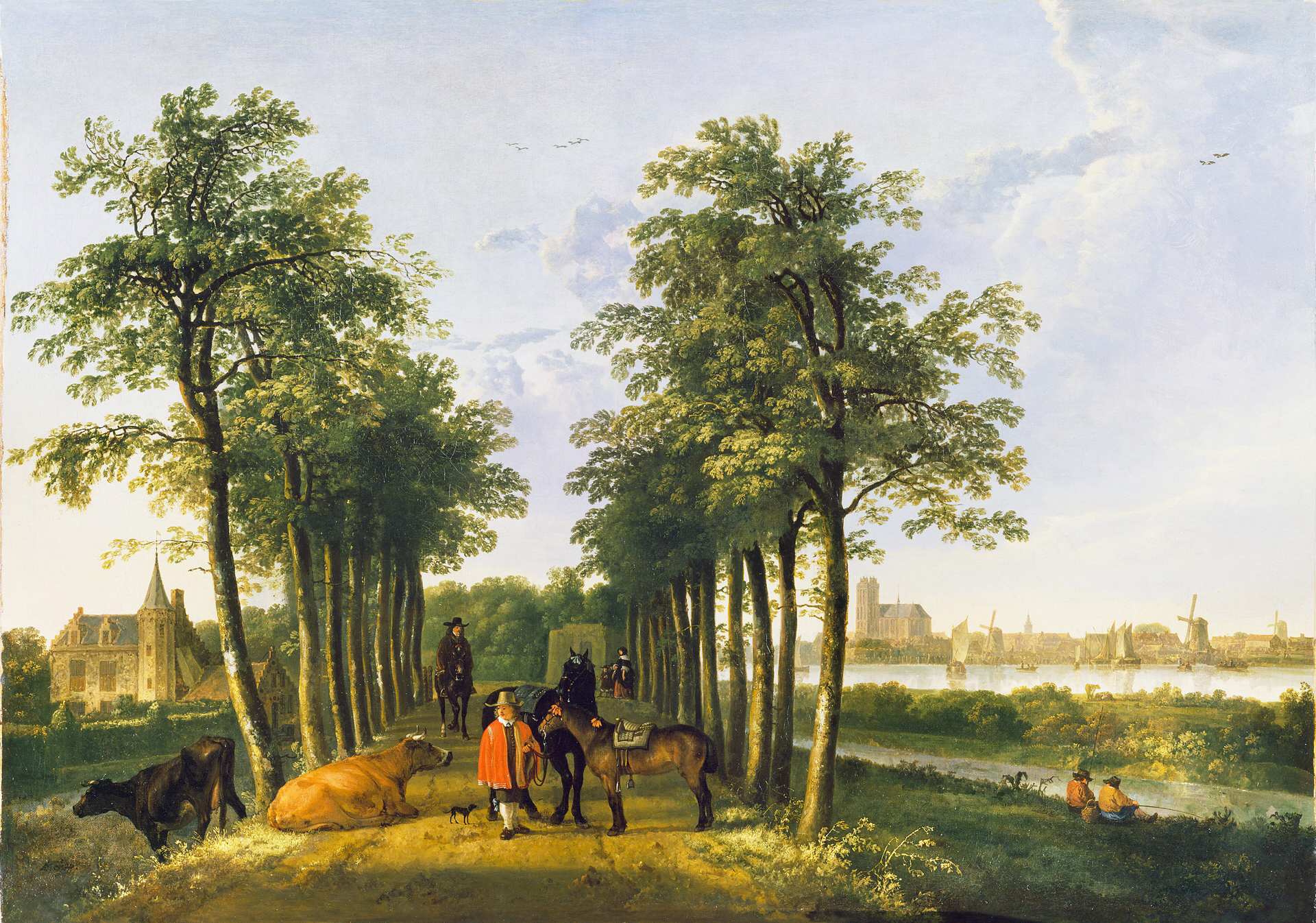
Aelbert Cuyp, The Avenue at Meerdervoort, 1650–1652, Wallace Collection

Meindert Hobbema (1638–1709) was a pupil of Jacob van Ruisdael, the pre-eminent landscape painter of the Dutch Golden Age, and in his mature period produced paintings developing one aspect of his master's more varied output, showing very different scenes from this painting. Hobbema specialized in "sunny forest scenes opened by roads and glistening ponds, fairly flat landscapes with scattered tree groups, and water mills", including over thirty of the last in paintings.

His paths or roads normally wind diagonally across his composition through dense trees and vegetation, the trees spreading and varying in size. The water mills and other buildings are generally seen in the near distance, rather as the barn is here, and generally only one or two appear in each picture. His compositions are carefully contrived and presumably imaginary, avoiding all symmetry. This painting is a surprising break from most of these somewhat "tired conventions of his earlier work".

In contrast to his usual scenes of rough woodland, in this scene the straight lines, lopped trees, deep drainage ditches on both sides of the road, and regimented young trees in the plot to the right, all emphasize the man-made nature of this landscape. A patch of rough woodland remains in the left foreground, contrasting with the saplings in rows on the right. The man tending to these is unusual in 17th-century Dutch landscapes, which rarely show anyone working the land. What brought Hobbema to this rather out-of-the-way location remains unknown.

In contrast to this accurate depiction of a specific place, it is thought that his compositions were usually assembled and painted in the studio from a number of different elements presumably recorded in drawings, and not all coming from the same place; there are often several versions changing parts of the composition.

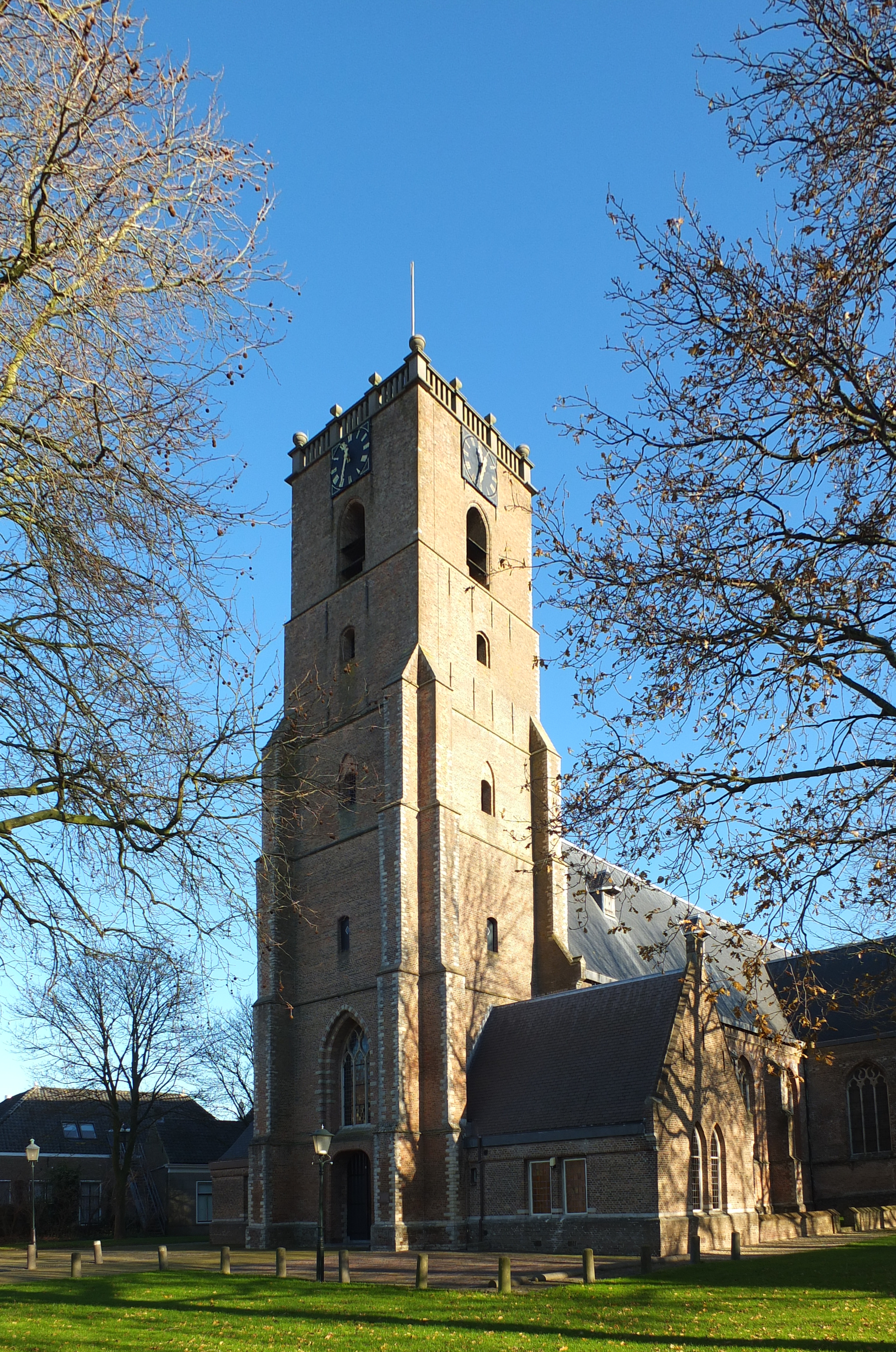
Middelharnis church tower in 2015

In 1668 he married and took the well-paid position of "wine-gauger" for the Amsterdam octroi, assessing and collecting local taxes on wine, holding this until his death. It is clear that his painting greatly reduced from this point, but it did not end completely, as used to be thought. The quality of his work becomes uneven, though this is not the only very successful late work.

Hofstede de Groot, like others at the time, believed Hobbema had completely stopped painting before the 1680s, and was sure the date read 1669. Subsequent cleaning, and the discovery that the alder trees were only planted by the council in 1664, has confirmed that 1689 is the correct date.

== Composition ==
The unusually centralized composition carries the viewer's eye down the road, and the thin, very tall lopped trees unite the sky and the land. The head of the gentleman with his dog is at a level with the vanishing point of the perspective, and very close to it. He is a hunter, with a gun sloped over his shoulder, and a satchel for his game. The "dark patches of ground and vegetation to the left and right of the road echo and reinforce the horizon line and counteract the inward pull of the perspective."

In 1980 x-ray radiography revealed that Hobbema had originally placed another tree in the foreground on each side of the avenue, but then painted these over. Erica Langmuir suggests that the two additional trees at the front were painted over because Hobbema decided that they would have "screened off the background from the foreground at the sides of the painting while exaggerating the 'rush' to the vanishing point in the centre." She suggests testing this by holding pencils over a reproduction.

For Seymour Slive the painting has "the exalted spaciousness which often characterizes the Late Baroque, and also a kind of elegance in the elongated, slender trees that goes with the taste of this phase".

Though unusual, there had been a few previous compositions with "a strongly foreshortened road lined with trees in a wide flat landscape". Aelbert Cuyp had painted The Avenue at Meerdervoort in 1650–1652 (now in the Wallace Collection).

== Condition ==
It was perhaps because the two painted-over trees in the foreground had begun to show through that the sky was extensively repainted in the 19th century. This was realized in 1972 after analysis of the pigments used found synthetic ultramarine and chrome yellow in the sky, which had not yet been invented in the 1680s. A 19th-century restorer may have attempted to bring back the two trees, before thinking better of it, as Hobbema himself had done.

The sky was largely repainted in 1951, much of which was removed in 1972, which "gave the painting an unsatisfactory appearance", so in 1980–81 all the 1951 repainting was removed and new retouches added. In contrast the landscape and trees are "very well preserved", although the colour balance of the greens has probably altered to give a "lighter and bluer shade of green than originally intended".

== Provenance ==
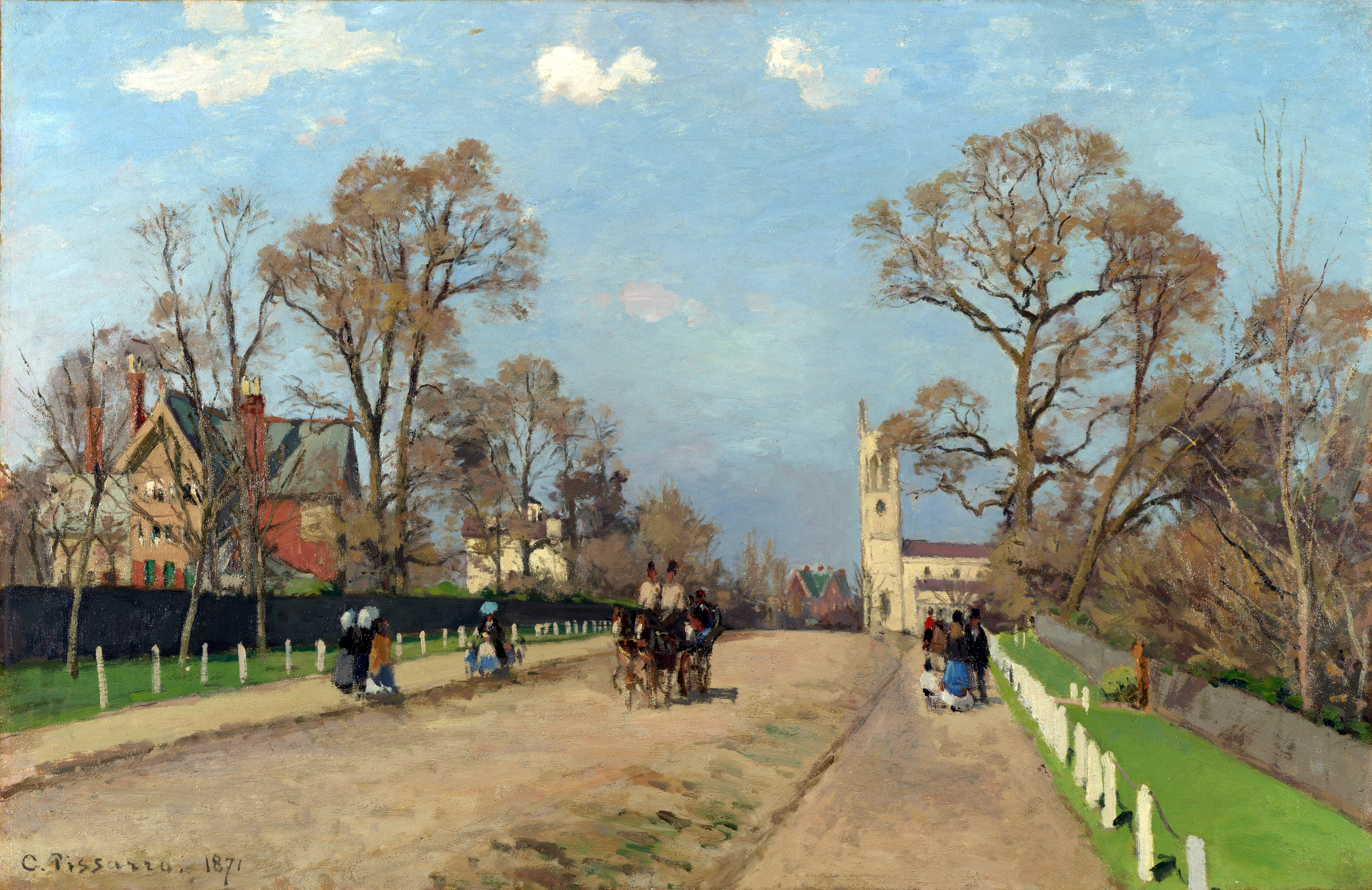
The Avenue, Sydenham by Camille Pissarro, painted in 1871, just after the National Gallery acquired the Hobbema

Nearly a century after being painted it was still on the island, in a collection in nearby Sommelsdijk, suggesting it had been commissioned by a local patron. After the death of the collector in 1782 it was bought by the Middelharnis council, and hung in the town hall until 1822. It was then exchanged with an obscure painter for a copy and another landscape painting, both by him. It then moved through the art trade, increasing rapidly in price, and reached Edinburgh in Scotland in 1826. Hobbema had been little appreciated and cheap in the 18th century, but his pictures were in tune with Romantic and later 19th-century taste, and prices rose accordingly through the 19th century.

In 1829 it was auctioned in Edinburgh for 195 guineas, already a good price, then taken to London and cleaned. It then fetched £800, and by 1834 was in the collection of Sir Robert Peel, 2nd Baronet, who had a significant collection of Dutch paintings, but is better known for having twice been Prime Minister of the United Kingdom in 1834–1835 and 1841–1846. It was exhibited at the British Institution in 1835, and in March 1871 entered the National Gallery as NG 830 when they bought seventy-seven pictures and eighteen drawings from the Peel Collection. These were bought from Peel's son Robert, the 3rd Baronet for £75,000, with a special grant from the government, and catalogued as NG 818 to 894.

The Avenue, Sydenham by Camille Pissarro was painted during a stay in London that ended in June 1871, a month after the National Gallery acquired the Hobbema, and its composition is probably influenced by it. Pissarro was then living in the London village, turning into a suburb, of Upper Norwood, next to Sydenham, avoiding the Franco-Prussian War. This painting is also now in the National Gallery.
