= Tax collector =

Person who collects taxes

A tax collector at work – from an illustration by Henry Holiday in Lewis Carroll's The Hunting of the Snark (1876).

A tax collector (also called a taxman) is a person who collects unpaid taxes from other people or corporations on behalf of a government. The term could also be applied to those who audit tax returns or work for a revenue agency. Tax collectors are often portrayed negatively, and in the modern world share a similar stereotype to that of lawyers.

== History ==
Historically taxes were collected directly by the King or ruler of a State. As states and administrative regions grew larger this task was outsourced to aristocrats or dedicated tax collectors.

=== Ancient Rome ===
In the Roman Republic, taxes were collected from individuals based on the value of their total property. However, since it was extremely difficult to facilitate the collection of the tax, the government auctioned the collection of taxes every year. The winning tax farmers (called publicani) paid the tax revenue to the government in advance and then kept the taxes collected from individuals. The publicani paid the tax revenue in coins, but collected the taxes using other exchange media, thus relieving the government of the work to carry out the currency conversion themselves.

=== New Testament ===
Tax collectors, also known as publicans, are mentioned many times in the Bible (mainly in the New Testament). They were reviled by the Jews of Jesus' day because of their perceived greed and collaboration with the Roman occupiers. Tax collectors amassed personal wealth by demanding tax payments in excess of what Rome levied and keeping the difference. They worked for tax farmers.

Jesus eats with tax collectors in Matthew 9:10-11. In the Gospel of Luke, Jesus sympathizes with the tax collector Zacchaeus, causing outrage from the crowds that Jesus would rather be the guest of a sinner than of a more respectable or "righteous" person. Matthew the Apostle in the New Testament was a tax collector.

=== Historical tax collectors ===
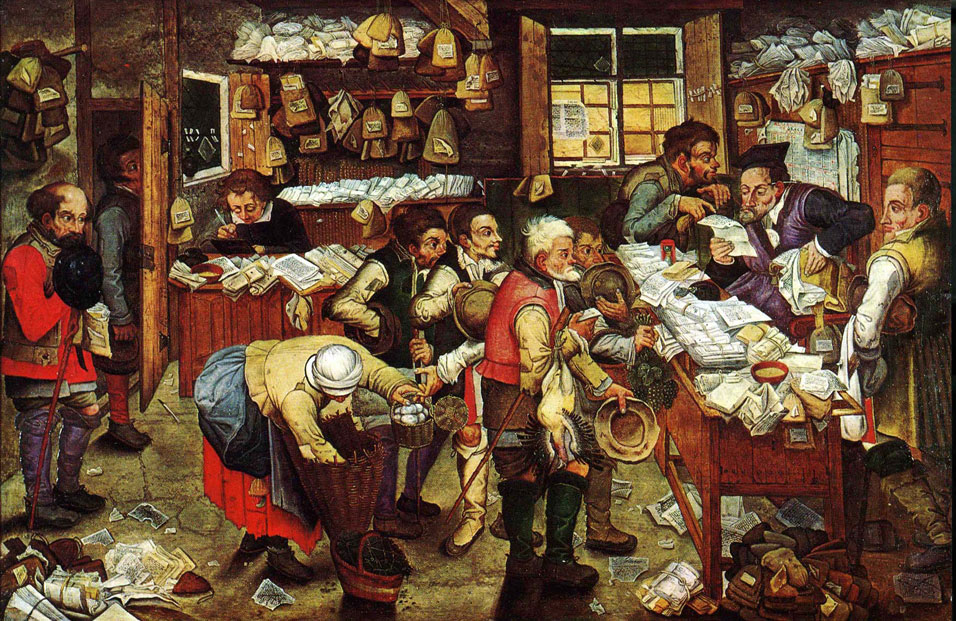
Paying the Tax (The Tax Collector) oil on panel painting by Pieter Brueghel the Younger, 1620-1640

- Simon Affleck - Was a Swedish tax official who worked in then Swedish-ruled Finland. Affleck is said to have been a ruthless collector of taxes with little pity towards the poor Finnish peasants. He is said to have shot himself in the head in his mansion to deny the Finnish peasants raiding his mansion the satisfaction of killing him.
- Jacob Gaón - A Jewish Basque tax collector that in 1463, went to the province of Guipúzcoa in Spain and reclaimed a tax called pedido to the inhabitants of the villa of Tolosa. They refused, arguing they had an exemption from paying these tributes, according to fueros and laws passed by the previous kings. Gaón menaced them, and several Tolosans killed him, cut his head off and hung it up on the top of a pillory, as a punishment.
- Antoine Lavoisier - A French nobleman and chemist who at the age of 26 bought a share in the Ferme générale, a tax farming financial company which advanced the estimated tax revenue to the royal government in return for the right to collect the taxes. Lavoisier was later convicted age 50 of tax fraud and executed at the guillotine.
- John the Cappadocian - A Roman Praetorian Prefect of the East who served under Emperor Justinian and had worked previously for his predecessor Emperor Justin. He helped to raise new taxes, but this eventually resulted in the Nika Riots in Constantinople. He fell from Justinian's grace, in part due to rivalries with other court officials and aristocrats and was stripped of his authority and exiled.

== Modern tax collection ==
In modern times, collection is done by a dedicated government tax collection agency known as a revenue services, a revenue agency or a taxation authority.

== Examples ==
- Catchpole
- District magistrate
- Privatized tax collection
