= Meindert Hobbema =

Dutch artist (c. 1638–1709)

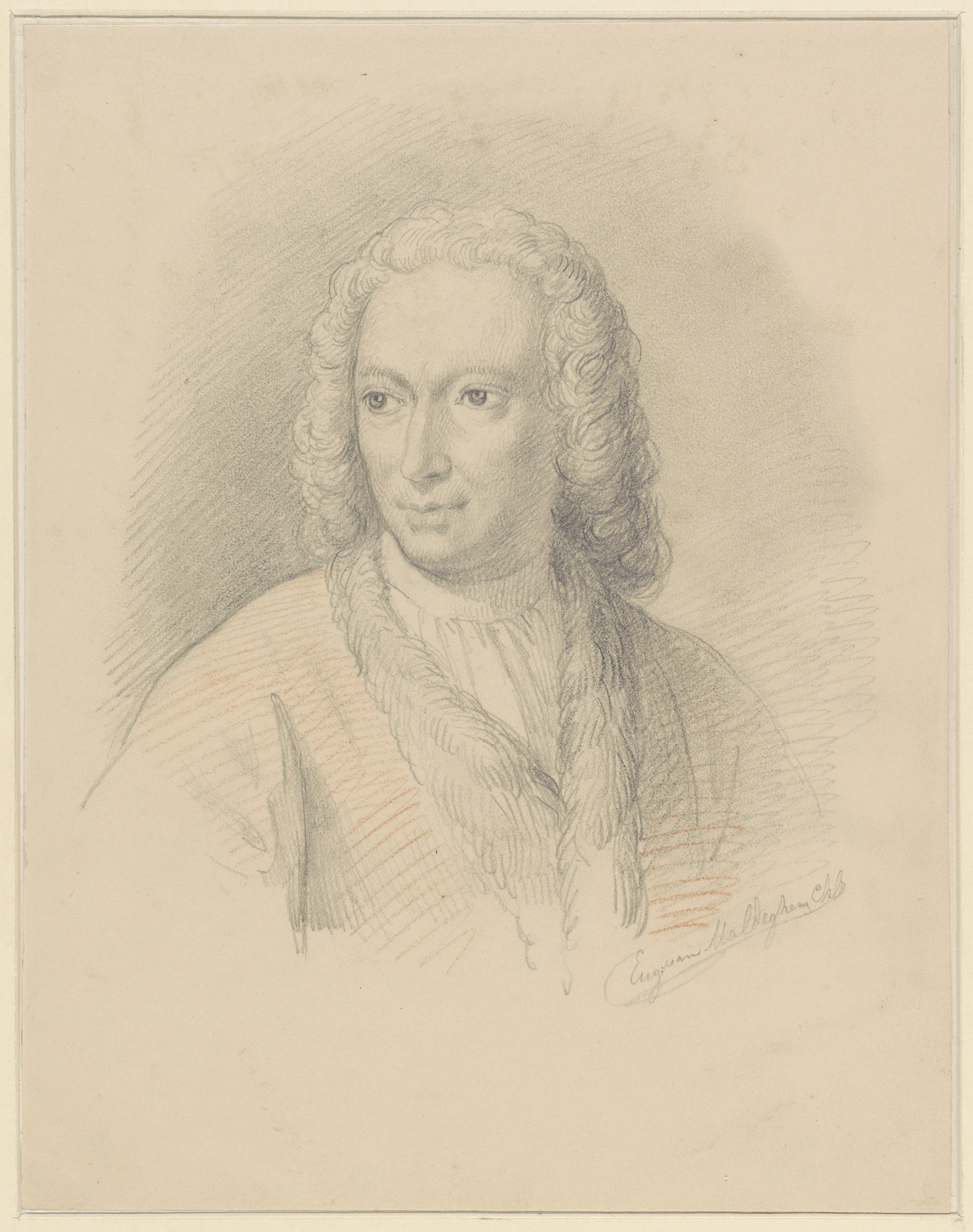
- Portrait by Eugene van Maldeghem, 1823–1867
- Born: Amsterdam, Netherlands
- Baptised: 31 October 1638
- Died: 7 December 1709; Amsterdam, Netherlands
- Known for: Landscape painting
- Notable work: The Avenue at Middelharnis

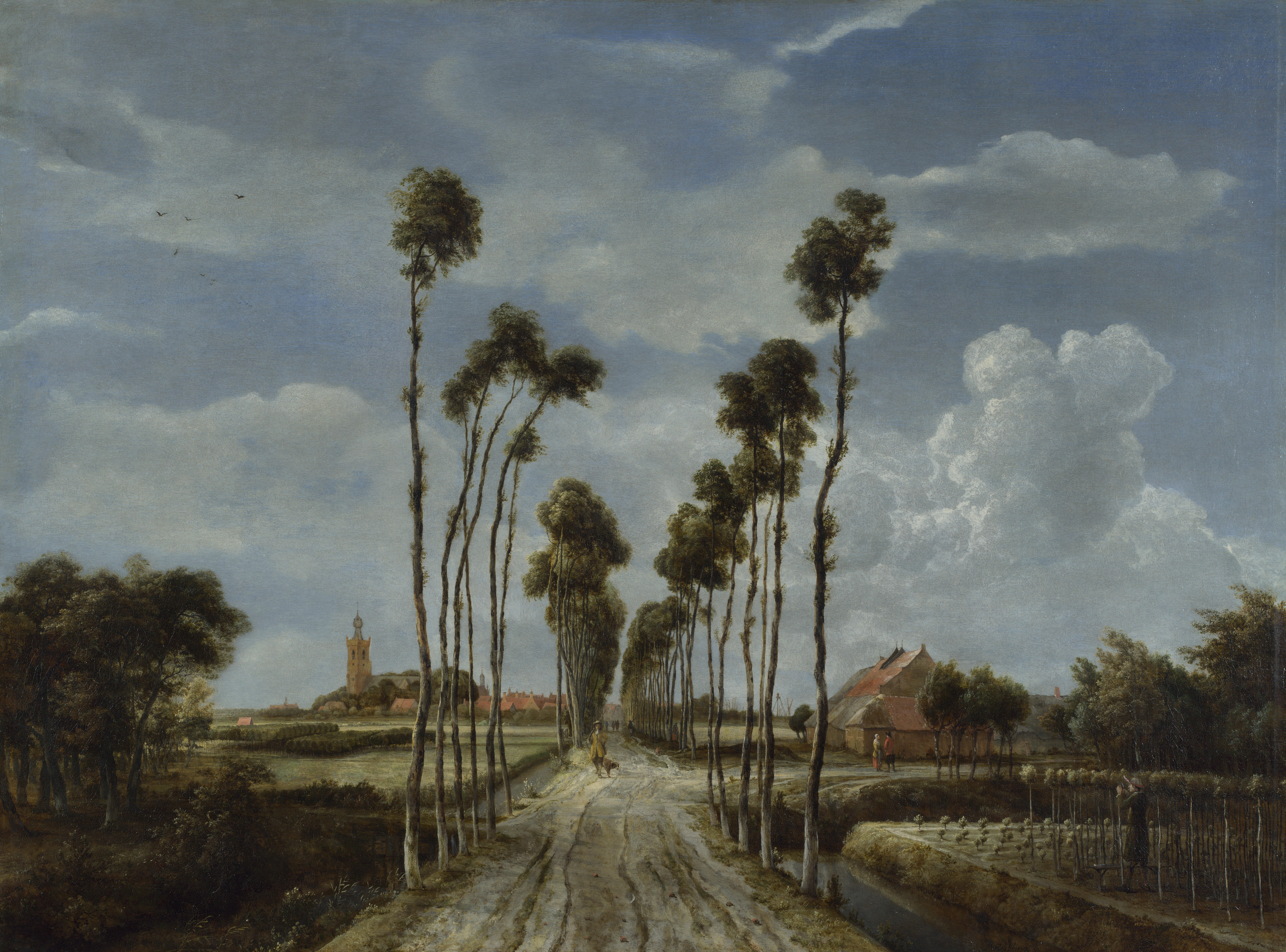
The Avenue at Middelharnis (1689), National Gallery, London

Meindert Lubbertszoon Hobbema (bapt. 31 October 1638 – 7 December 1709) was a Dutch Golden Age painter of landscapes, specializing in views of woodland, although his most famous painting, The Avenue at Middelharnis (1689, National Gallery, London), shows a different type of scene.

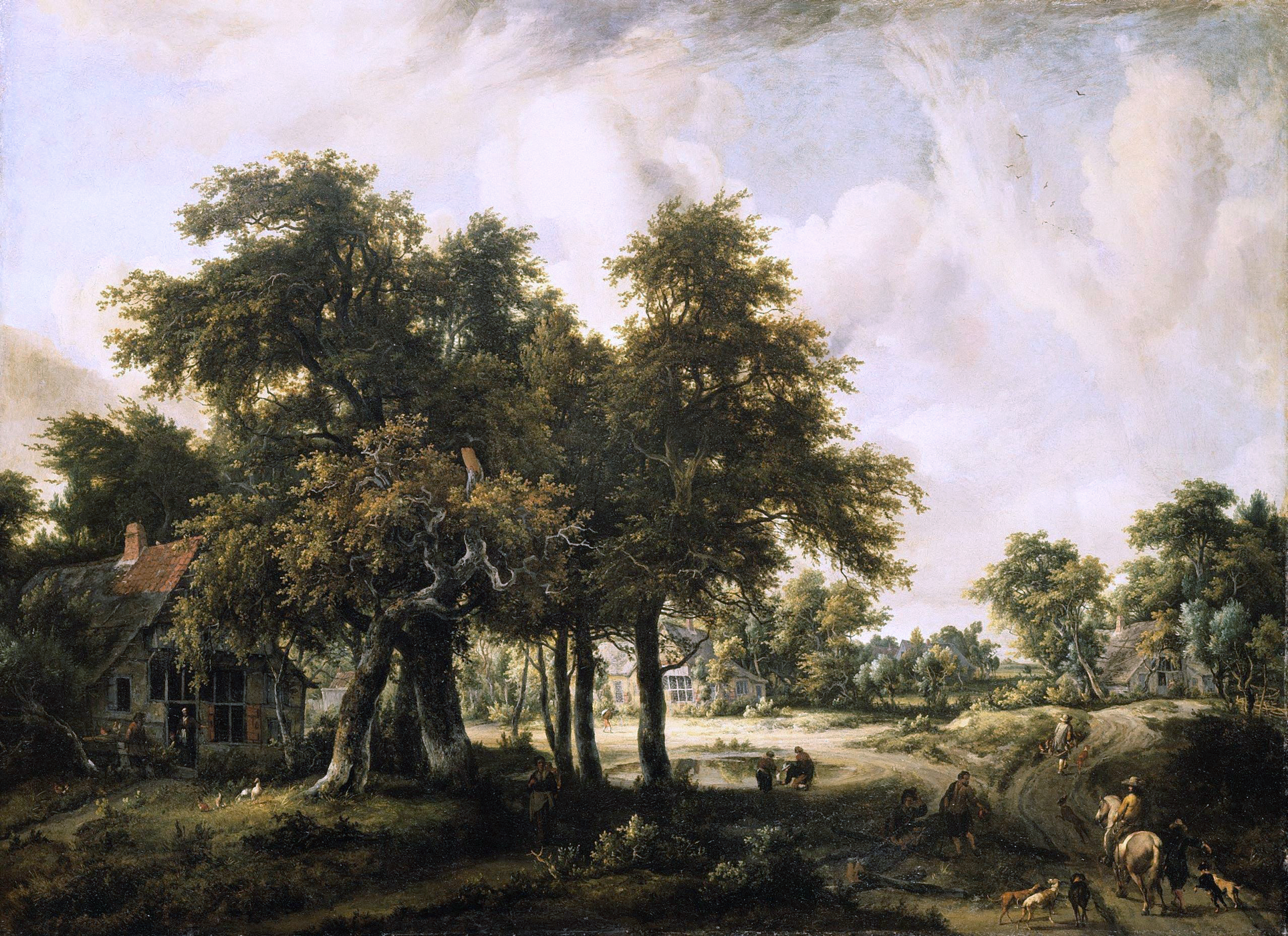
Wooded Landscape with Farmsteads, c. 1665, Mauritshuis, The Hague

Hobbema was a pupil of Jacob van Ruisdael, the pre-eminent landscape painter of the Dutch Golden Age, and in his mature period produced paintings developing one aspect of his master's more varied output, specializing in "sunny forest scenes opened by roads and glistening ponds, fairly flat landscapes with scattered tree groups, and water mills", including over 30 of the last in paintings.

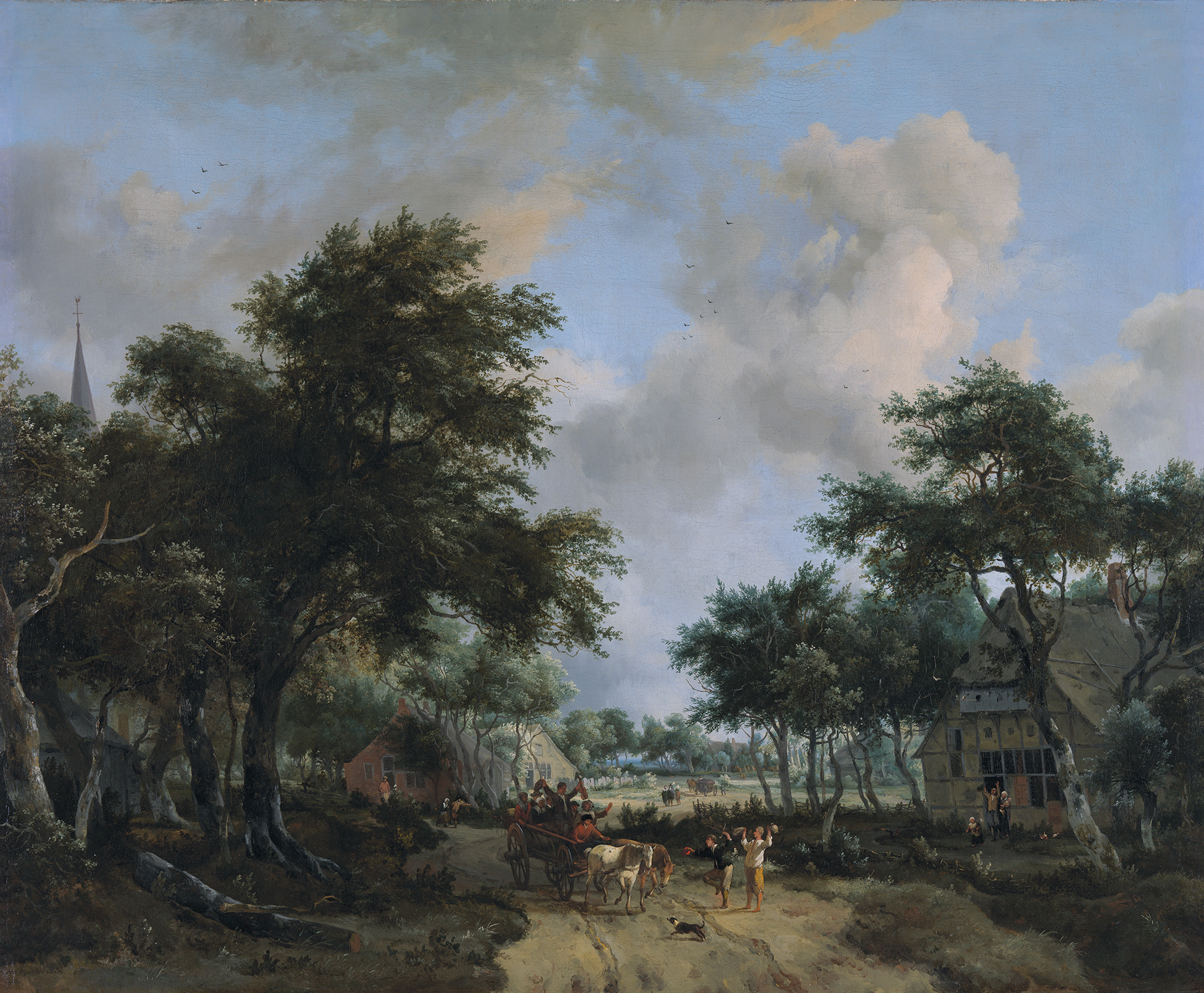
Forest landscape with a merry company in a cart, Rijksmuseum, c. 1665.

The majority of his mature works come from the 1660s; after he married and took a job as an exciseman in 1668 he painted less, and after 1689 apparently not at all. He was not very well known in his lifetime or for nearly a century after his death, but became steadily more popular from the last decades of the 18th century until the 20th century.

== Life ==
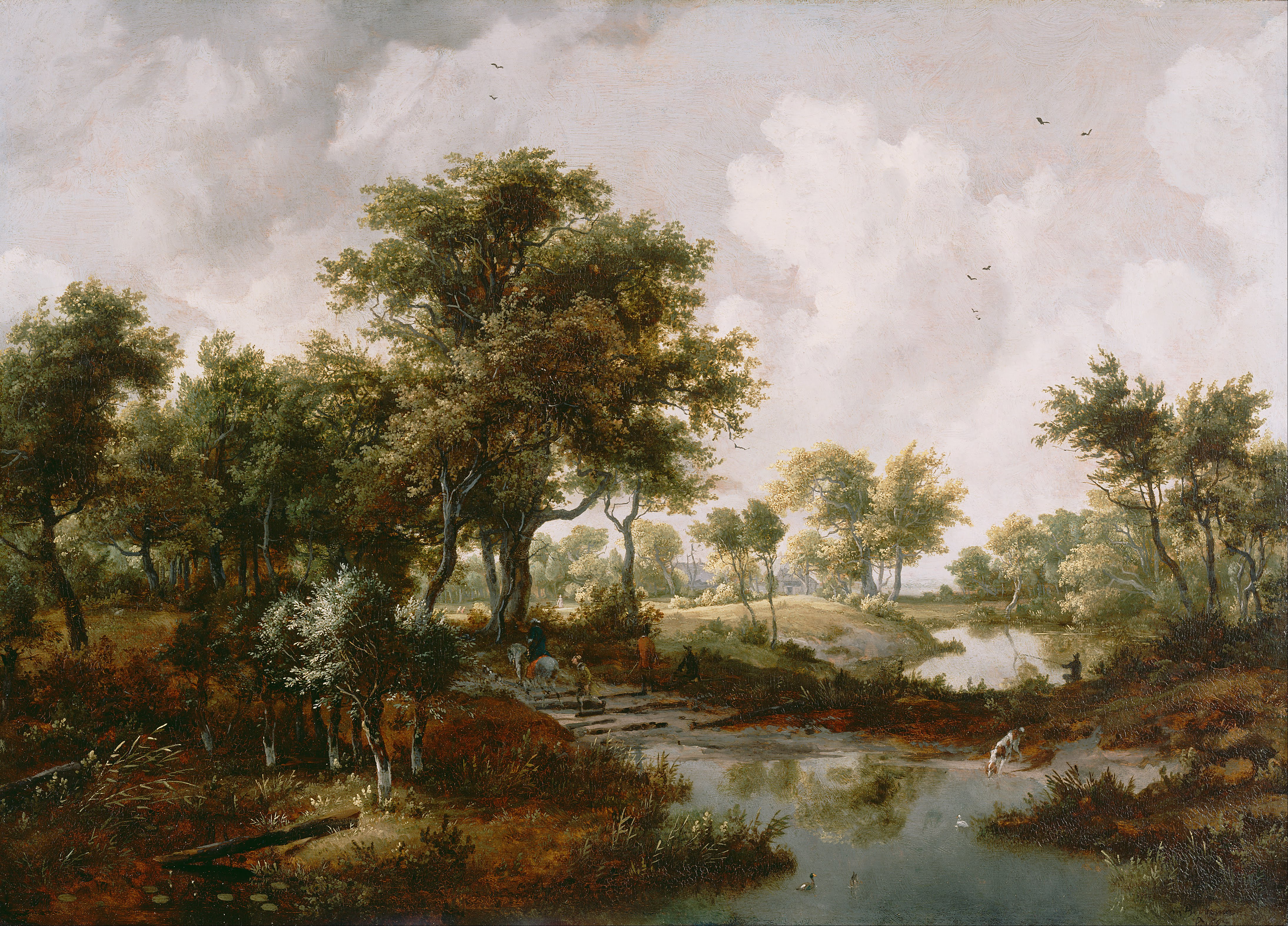
A Wooded Landscape, Getty Center, 1667.

Hobbema was born and died in Amsterdam. The son of a carpenter named Lubbert Meyndertsz, he adopted his grandmother´s surname Hobbema quite early on, although it is not known why. He spent a period in an orphanage from 1653, but by about two years later he had left, and soon became the only documented pupil of the leading Amsterdam landscapist, Jacob van Ruisdael, whose influence was to dominate his work. Jan van Kessel may also have been a pupil of Ruisdael; he was close to Hobbema, who was godfather to his child in 1675.

Hobbema's signed pictures come from 1658 to 1689. For a considerable period it was profitable to pass off Hobbemas as Ruisdaels, and Hobbema's name was probably removed from several of his works. Hobbema seems to have painted the figures on a number of Ruisdael's paintings; they were recognised as a weakness of the master. They may have travelled together a short way across the German border in 1661, via the Veluwe, Deventer and Ootmarsum.

Hobbema married at the age of 30, to Eeltje Vinck from Gorcum, a maidservant to the burgomaster Lambert Reynst, at this point an important political figure in the "republican" Dutch States Party as brother-in-law to the De Graeff brothers (but soon to lose office and influence in the Rampjaar of 1672). She was four years older than him. The wedding was in the Oude Kerk (Old Church) at Amsterdam, on 2 November 1668. Witnesses to the marriage were the bride's brother Cornelius Vinck and Jacob van Ruisdael.

The couple had five children (Eduart 1669, Eduart 1670, Pieternella 1671, Pieternella 1673 and Neeltje 1676). In 1704 Eeltje died, and was buried in the paupers' section of the Leiden cemetery at Amsterdam. Hobbema himself survived till December 1709, and was buried on the 14th of that month in the paupers' section of the Westerkerk cemetery at Amsterdam.

Also in 1668, and presumably through the connection with his wife's ex-employer, he took the well-paid position of "wine-gauger" for the Amsterdam octroi, assessing and collecting local taxes on wine, holding this until his death. It is clear that his painting greatly reduced after this, but it did not end completely, as used to be thought. The quality of his work becomes uneven, though there are very successful late works, including The Avenue at Middelharnis, dated 1689 and one of his last paintings. After 1672 the Dutch art market "virtually collapsed" for the rest of the century, and other artists of his approximate generation produced much less, including Johannes Vermeer, Pieter de Hooch and Nicolaes Berchem.

The Hobbema family lived in the Rozengracht in the Jordaan neighbourhood, as had Rembrandt in his later and impoverished days, as well as Adam Pynacker, Jacob van Loo, Cornelis Holsteyn and other artists. Rembrandt, Frans Hals, Jacob Ruisdael, and Hobbema all died in relative poverty, after they had fallen from fashion, and in Hobbema's case after the Dutch art market had largely collapsed.

Hobbema and Ruisdael together represent the final development of Golden Age Dutch landscape art; by the end of Hobbema's career, demand had severely declined.

== Work ==
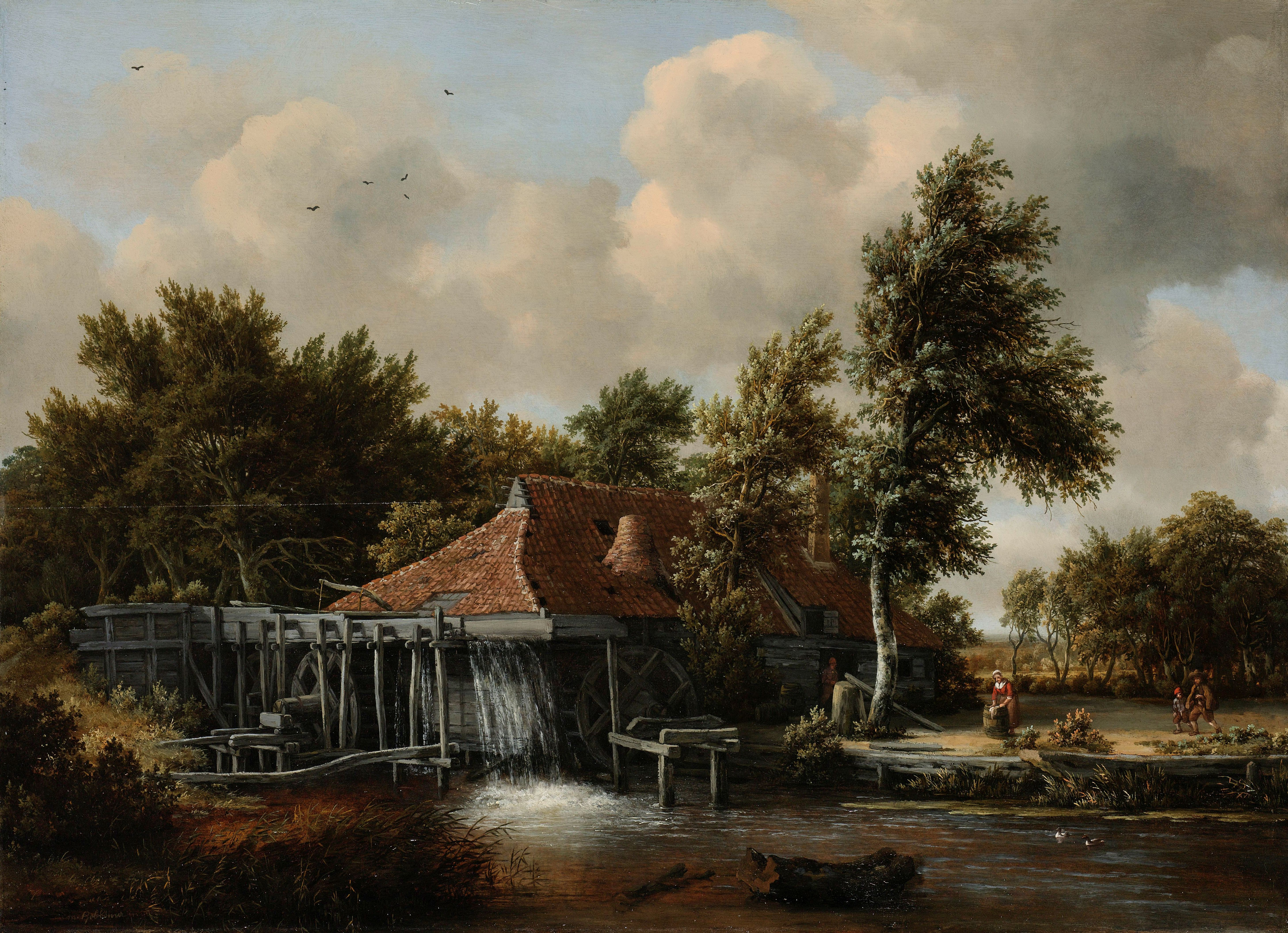
Another Watermill, Rijksmuseum

Despite his apprenticeship with Jacob van Ruisdael, Hobbema's earliest paintings, from the late 1650s, are mostly river scenes more in the style of Cornelis Vroom and Salomon van Ruysdael. From around 1662 the influence of Jacob van Ruisdael becomes much stronger, and Hobbema settled into his speciality of wooded landscapes, very often with ponds, roads, and a building or two. Even within the Dutch painting of his day, where specialization in a particular type of subject-matter had become normal, his concentration on such a specific subject was rather unusual.

The remainder of the 1660s, especially up to 1668, produced most of his best works, which increased in size and complexity as he perfected his style. His landscapes are sunnier than the equivalent scenes by Jacob van Ruisdael, with the principal trees typically seen with sky behind. His skill at varying effects of light and colour throughout a work is exceptional. He often makes use of double vanishing points to add interest to the composition. Some of his compositions, as late as 1664, are near-copies of Jacob van Ruysdael, and he often repeats his own compositions with variations; four of the five works in the Wallace Collection have other versions. For some of these he made use of assistants, though little is known about them or their role.

His paths or roads normally wind diagonally across his composition through dense trees and vegetation, the trees spreading and varying in size. The water mills and other buildings are generally seen in the near distance, and generally only one or two appear in each picture. His compositions are carefully contrived and presumably imaginary, normally avoiding all symmetry.

The Avenue at Middelharnis, a very late work, is a surprising break from most of these somewhat "tired conventions of his earlier work", and a very accurate depiction of a specific spot. In contrast to his usual scenes of rough woodland, in this scene the straight lines, lopped trees, deep drainage ditches on both sides of the road, and regimented young trees in the plot to the right, all emphasize the man-made nature of this landscape. A patch of rough woodland remains in the left foreground, contrasting with the saplings in rows on the right. The man tending to these is unusual in 17th-century Dutch landscapes, which rarely show anyone working the land.

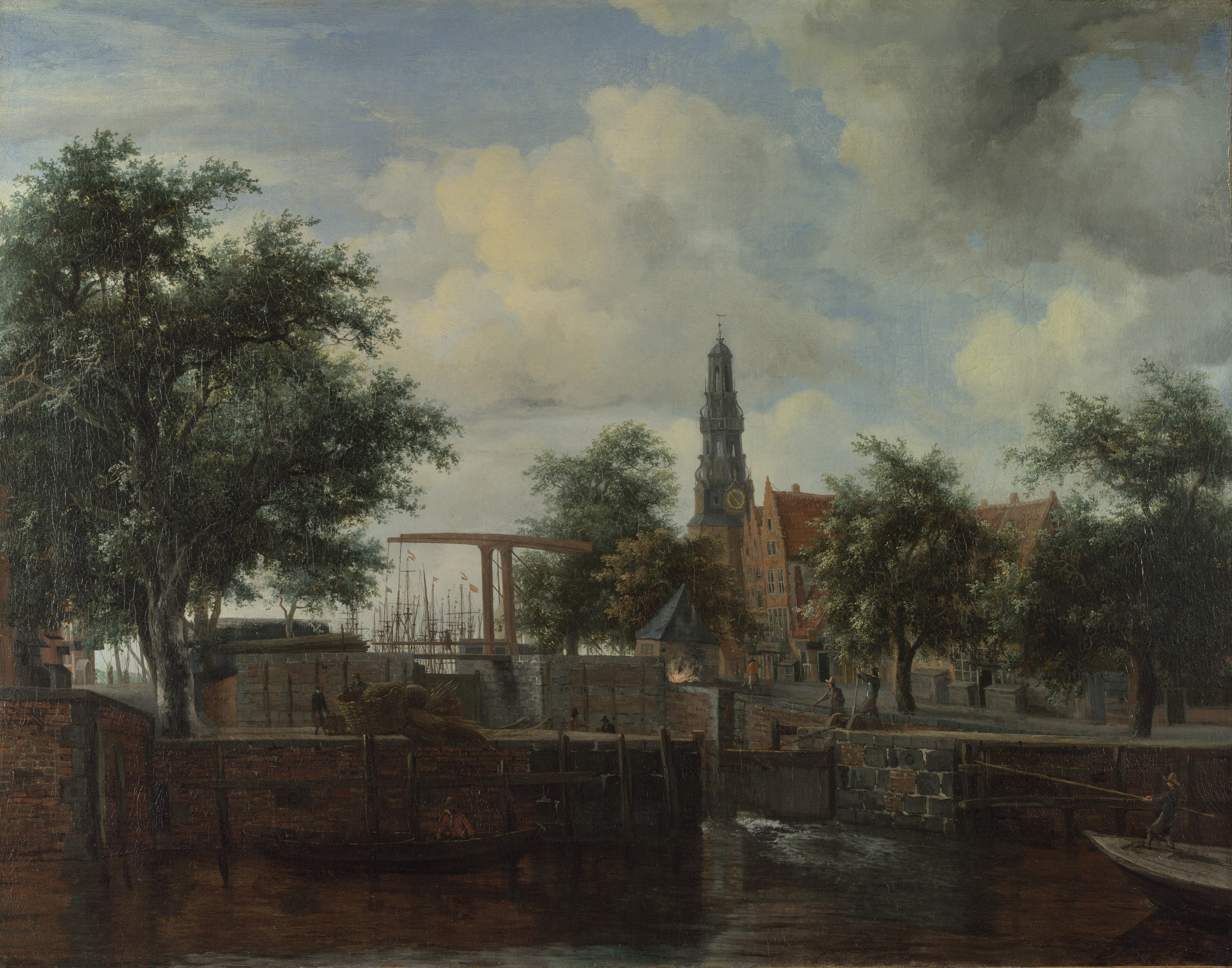
The Haarlem Lock, Amsterdam, 1663-65, his only generally accepted townscape. National Gallery, London

The Haarlem Lock, Amsterdam in the National Gallery is his only generally accepted townscape, and still shows a foreground mainly of trees and water. The corner of the street where Hobbema was living by 1668 can be seen at the left. In some cases he delegated the human figures in his paintings to Adriaen van de Velde and perhaps others, a common practice in the period. In others he did the figures but probably sub-contracted birds and animals.

He often painted on oak panels, at least to the late 1660s; of the nine paintings in the National Gallery, five are on oak, but not the two dated 1689. No drawings certainly by him survive, and only a few are attributed. Despite this, it is thought that his compositions were mainly assembled and painted in the studio from a number of elements presumably recorded in drawings.

== Reputation ==
Hobbema is not mentioned by Arnold Houbraken, the Vasari of the Dutch Golden Age, or indeed any literary source during his lifetime at all, and his work rarely appears in early auction catalogues, fetching little when it does. The English, and to some extent the French, were more appreciative of his work than the Dutch in the 18th century, and a large number of his works left Holland. His style had become influential and respected by the Romantic period, and began to climb in value, especially in England. He was loved by John Constable, John Crome and the Norwich school of painters, all of whom he influenced.

By the 1820s prices could be over £1,000, and by 1900 over £10,000. A record price of £33,000 (equivalent) was reached in 1933 with a sale to America of a work from the Jan Six collection. The highest recent prices include a painting now in the Mauritshuis, the Hague, sold in December 1995 for £3.74 million (illustrated above), and a larger picture now in the J. Paul Getty Museum, Los Angeles, sold in July 2001 for £6.5 million, both at Sotheby's.

Hobbema's modern critical reputation is equivocal, with several critics expressing a degree of boredom with his woodland scenes, while others are more appreciative. The Avenue at Middelharnis remains in near-universal favour, placed in a category by itself: "it is as if the artist had produced only a single picture" according to Christopher Lloyd. The situation is not helped by the surprising lack of art historical scholarship on him; there has not been a monograph since 1938, and that received a savage review from Neil MacLaren, the National Gallery's Dutch specialist. Kenneth Clark thought that "an artist as skillful as Hobbema grows tedious, because the elaboratedly described trees in his woodland scenes are not subordinated to a general principle of light".

== Other ==
- In 1891 a hamlet in Alberta (Canada) was called Hobbema after the painter. On 1 January 2014 the name was changed to Maskwacis (meaning Bear Hills) on request of the native Cree who live in the area.
