= Hollow state =

The term "hollow state" is used to describe a set of governmental practices in which states contract with third parties (private companies) in order to distribute government services. In a hollow state there are many degrees of separation between the source of taxpayer funds and the final distribution of taxpayer-funded products or services. Services paid for by the state are produced by a vast network of providers and the task of the government is not to manage provision, but to negotiate contracts with providers. There is no "command and control" relationship between government and contractors. Contracts are managed by countless agencies and even more providers, there is no means of central record keeping or data management. A Hollow State has all the standard edifices of governance although most are under the influence of third-party organizations, either for-profit or non-profit entities.

== History ==
The history of government contracting goes back thousands of years to when mercenary bands were utilized by the ancient Greeks, Persians, and Romans. In the United States, the history of government contracting is rooted in the history of English civil service. Throughout the 1600s, educated Englishmen could make a career out of negotiating the procurement of goods for local government, especially for the English military. This system was how much of the English military procurement was carried out, and was brought to the colonies by English settlers. The English military in the colonies was expected to obtain their own supplies locally. To this end, most military outfits employed a commissary general to obtain food and related supplies, and a quartermaster general to obtain supplies for construction, transportation, and weaponry. These officers had the authority to contract with local farmers and merchants. A version of this system was implemented by the Continental Congress during the American Revolution. This trend continued through the American Civil War and has grown and evolved into the modern system of government procurement. The United States government increasingly implements policy through a complicated network of providers. The system relies on the collaboration of multiple levels of government, for-profit, and non-profit entities.

The history of the term "Hollow State" is shorter than the history of the practice, as capitalism emerged as a dominant social force, so did the influence of private contractors on government leaders. Brinton Milward, Director of the School of Government and Public Policy at the University of Arizona, uses the term Hollow State as a metaphor to describe the process and consequences of excessive government contracting.

Examples of modern Hollow State iterations include:

- China, though often in rural areas as opposed to on a national scale
- South Africa has been trending toward a Hollow State for years with moves empowering business over people
- Zimbabwe is an example of a current Hollow State.

== Infrastructure ==
The primary purpose of the hollow state is to function as a multi-organizational structure through which policy is designed and executed. The metaphor "Hollow State" is meant to be understood as a system consisting of units of government separated from their outputs but still linked by negotiation or contract. When nonprofit organizations receive contracts or grants to deliver public goods or services, the delegating agency assumes a sufficient level of capacity to implement the project or deliver the service. However, if the nonprofit community-based organizations are too limited in capacity to carry out their grants or contracts, then a disconnect occurs in the hollow state.

One of the primary reasons privatization occurs is a severe limitation of capacity that forces government to contract for services it does not have the ability to provide. Usually this would involve a private development network supported by a public administration like the Chamber of Commerce and several private businesses. There are 2 types of networks that exist in the hollow state: horizontal and vertical. Horizontal networks consist of 3 types, policy making, resource exchange, and project based, all of which are between governments and non-governmental organizations. Vertical networks are the collaborations that occur between federal, state, and local governments.

The purpose of this collaboration is to devise strategy for business retention, expansion, or recruitment. The reason city economics developers reach out to surrounding organizations and become multiple networks is due to the fact that economic policy is designed and implemented under ambiguity and uncertainty. As complexities increase, grassroots initiatives become more sought after. Most nonprofit organizations are started with passion and enthusiasm for resolving a particular issue. Many of these are the small grassroots or community-based nonprofits that meet important human service needs for a specific geographic area or population. Furthermore, the need for more nongovernmental actors to deliver local services hence more actors equates to more hollowing of the state. In fact publicly funded social services are an increasingly important component of social provision spending and accounft for approximately one-fifth to today's welfare state expenditures. Substituting from a stable, linear government for complex networks may raise questions of allocation deliberations being solely prompted by cost/ efficiency not taking into account taxpayers other values.

== Contracting ==
The Hollow State refers to the extent to which governments are directly involved in providing services.^{[4]} Contracting out is when government allows a non-government institution to operate under the governments name to provide a public service. Hollowing out of government by allocating services to private organizations has three imperatives: the need to attract investment to compensate for lost revenues and meet the political imperatives set by the country and provincial governments; the need to receive inspection teams from higher levels of government; and "soft centralization" of township bureaus, which are placed under country or provincial government control.

Advocates of privatization often make the point that government can provide or arrange for citizens to receive a service without the government actually providing it,^{[5]} by contracting out. A government intent on privatization would decide what it wanted done and then contract with the private sector to provide the good or the service.^{[5]} The federal government has always relied on state and local governments to distribute and provide services with money funded by the federal level. However, community-based development organizations have problems with accountability, responsiveness, and sometimes lose their connections with municipalities. This can lead to experiencing disparities in fundraising, fiscal and human resource management practices, and even skills in building and maintaining partnerships and gaining political support.

Contracting out or privatization also redirects the funds that would otherwise go to the state and local government to private organizations. It can be said that there is a negative relationship between the neighborhoods where the central offices of those organizations are located, and neighborhood disadvantage, largely because so many distributive organization headquarters are located in downtown, higher-income areas. Government funding of nonprofit agencies in the United States of America increased during the grant-in-aid explosion of the 1960s and 1970s and continued during the Reagan and Bush administrations under the banners of privatization, limited budgets, and getting government off the backs of those it regulates.^{[5]} Not all states who adopt the Hollow State find it successful and more often than not those states fail and lose their political goods.

== Criticism ==
There are several outspoken criticisms of government contracting practices. Critics claim the hollow state can be inefficient, dangerous, and may violate human rights. The hollow state can effectively destroy a society's interests in humanities as money leads to a monopoly and/or oligarchy. A hollow state can be unreliable. When a government sector contracts out, there can be many problems. The hollow state is exemplified by increased reliance on third-party producers, which may result in a lack of oversight expertise in government. Contracting private organizations for warfare can lead to unethical methods and the hollow state can effectively destroy a society's interests in humanities as money leads to a monopoly and/or oligarchy.

The problems of managing non-governmental, contracted organizations are extensive and severe. The number of degrees of separation between the source of funds and the implementation of those funds creates diminishing quality of returns with each new layer. Managers at every level are forced to deal with an uncertain budget cycle, long waits for payment for services rendered, financial crises, billing problems, frequently changing and contradictory rules and much more. Another thing to consider is the existence of the "principal-agent" issue, wherein the "principal" (the person giving the contract) can never have as much information about the requirements of the job than the "agent" (the one being contracted). This information disparity causes the principal to have unrealistic expectations and allows the agent to mislead the principle as to aspects such as cost, time, and human resources.

Administrations that already exist within a country moving toward a Hollow State begin to be parsed in seemingly innocent fashion. In the name of "efficiency" government interests are delegated to private contractor, who will then often subcontract to other groups. For example, contractors hired to patch roofs with blue tarp for FEMA after Katrina received payment of "between $149 and $175 per (10ftx10ft square)." This price was comparable to installing entirely new roofs at the time. However; through a long string of subcontractors, the firms performing the final installations of the tarps "earned as little as $2 per 10ftx10ft square. Taxpayers end up paying exorbitantly as business interests takes complete control over the process of procurement.

== See also ==
- Government auction
- Vectigalia
- Tax farming
