= Tax farming =

Technique of financial management

Farming or tax-farming is a technique of financial management in which the management of a variable revenue stream is assigned by legal contract to a third party and the holder of the revenue stream receives fixed periodic rents from the contractor. It is most commonly used in public finance, where governments (the lessors) lease or assign the right to collect and retain the whole of the tax revenue to a private financier (the farmer), who is charged with paying fixed sums (sometimes called "rents", but with a different meaning from the common modern term) into the treasury.

Farming in this sense has nothing to do with agriculture, other than in a metaphorical sense.

== Etymology ==
There are two possible origins for farm.

=== Derivation from classical Latin ===
Some sources derive "farm" with its French version ferme, most notably used in the context of the Fermiers Generaux, from the mediaeval Latin firma, meaning "a fixed agreement, contract", ultimately from the classical Latin adjective firmus, firma, firmum, meaning "firm, strong, stout, steadfast, immoveable, sure, to be relied upon". The modern agricultural sense of the word stems from the same origin, in that a medieval land-"holder" (no-one "owned" land but the king himself under his allodial title) under feudal land tenure might let it (i.e. lease it out) under a contract as a going concern (not as a sub-infeudated fee), that is to say as a unit producing a revenue stream, together with its workers and livestock, for exploitation by a tenant who was licensed by the contract, or firma, to keep all the revenue he could extract from the holding in exchange for fixed rents. Thus the rights to the revenue stream produced by the land had been farmed by the lessor. Because this was the form of the farming transaction most known to popular society, the word "farmer" became synonymous with a tenant of an agricultural holding.

=== Derivation from Old English ===
According to other sources, the word farm comes from Middle English ferme ("farm, rent, revenue; revenue collected from a farmer; factor, stewardship, meal, feast"), from Old English feorm, farm ("provision, stores of food, supplies, possessions; provisions supplied to the king or a lord by a tenant or vassal; rent, feast, benefit, asylum"), from Proto-Germanic *firmō, *firχumō ("means of living, subsistence"), from Proto-Indo-European *perk^{w}u- ("life, strength, force"). It is related to other Old English words such as feormehām ("farm"), feormere ("purveyor, grocer"), feormian ("to provision, sustain"), and feorh ("life, spirit"). The Old English word is stated by these sources as having unusually been borrowed by Medieval Latin as firma or ferma and to have provided the Old French ferme "farm", Occitan ferma "farm". This is refuted by those sources which state firma to derive from classical Latin firmus. The word continued the same senses of "rent, farmed office, source of revenue, feast". The meaning "rent, fixed payment", which was already present in the Old English word, was further strengthened due to the word's resemblance to the unrelated (so say these sources) Latin firmus ("firm, solid"), and firmitas ("security, firmness").

== Valuation of a farm ==
The tenant of a farm can only make a profit after carefully assessing its value. While modern financial management theory employs scientific formulae for such calculations, astute financiers of the past would have understood them well, whether done mentally or by making marks in the sand.

To determine the maximum rent they are willing to pay, the tenant estimates the long-term average yearly gross value of the revenue stream, based on past records and accounts, adjusting for any new circumstances affecting the future. They then deduct a risk element and a discount for the time value of money.

The risk is related to the possibility of some debts forming the revenue stream being defaulted on or paid late, leading to variability in the revenue. The resulting figure becomes the maximum rent the tenant offers to the farm's lessor. The tenant's profit is the excess of revenues extracted from the farm, less the rents, administration, levying, and collection expenses.

The tenant's skills lie in negotiating a favorable rent by overstating the riskiness of the cash flow stream and effectively managing the assigned debts as a skilled debt-collector and manager. They must ensure their ability to enforce debt payments, including resorting to legal action and paying standard fees for bringing a lawsuit under the government authority that is the farm's lessor. The tenant acts as a principal, not the lessor's agent.

== Historical use ==
=== Roman Empire ===
Tax farming was originally a Roman practice whereby the burden of tax collection was reassigned by the Roman State to private individuals or groups. In essence, these individuals or groups paid the taxes for a certain area and for a certain period of time and then attempted to cover their outlay by collecting money or saleable goods from the people within that area. The system was set up by Gaius Gracchus in 123 BC primarily to increase the efficiency of tax collection within Rome itself but the system quickly spread to the Provinces. Within the Roman Empire, these private individuals and groups which collected taxes in lieu of the bid (i.e. rent) they had paid to the state were known as publicani, of whom the best known is the disciple of Jesus, Matthew the Apostle, a publicanus in the village of Capernaum in the province of Galilee. The system was widely abused, and reforms were enacted by Augustus and Diocletian.

=== Feudal England ===
Medieval English kings frequently made grants "in fee-farm", a form of feudal tenure. An example is the following writ of King William II (1087–1100) granting a hundred court to be held in fee-farm by Thorney Abbey:

William, king of the English, to all the sheriffs and barons of Huntingdonshire, greeting. Know that I have granted the Hundred of Normancross to the abbot and monks of Thorney to be held in fee-farm for an annual rent of 100 shillings which I order them to pay to my sheriff at Huntingdon. And I forbid any of my officers to do them injury or insult in respect of this.

=== Medieval Egypt ===
The Chief Rabbi of Egypt, Sar Shalom ben Moses was accused of tax farming, which led to his excommunication by Maimonides.

=== Ottoman Empire ===
The iltizam (Ottoman Turkish: التزام) is a non-heritable tax-farming system and was established under Sultan Mehmet II; however this changed by the 18th century and holders of grants-for-life (malikâne) developed their own landowning class. It was officially terminated in 1856 during the Tanzimat reforms.

=== Other uses ===
Besides the Romans, historical examples include the tax collection methods of the Ptolemies, Seljuks, Mamluks, Ottomans, the French State prior to Louis XVI (see ferme générale), and Russia prior to 1862 and the Dutch East Indies (see pacht) prior to the twentieth century. In many cases, such as the Abbasid practice of Iqta, these rights were granted by an authority, in this example the caliph, for services rendered or promised. In the Byzantine pronoia system, similar rights were often purchased from the crown. Though such arrangements in some respects seem similar to the feudal system, there are significant disparities, including continuance of state power and, at least in the case of pronoia, theoretical time limits on the grant. In many cases, including those mentioned, tax rights were not transferable or divisible, unlike feudal fiefdoms.

Sometimes, as in the case of Miguel de Cervantes, the tax farmer was a government employee, paid a salary, and all money collected went to the government.

== Advantages ==
Tax farming was an important step in the history of economic development by providing a method for collecting taxes across a large area without the need for a tax-collecting bureaucracy, or during periods when such a bureaucracy is unworkable or impossible to maintain. Systems of tax farming similar to the Roman model were used in Ptolemaic Egypt, various medieval Western European countries, the Ottoman and Mughal empires, and in Qing dynasty China. As states become stronger, buoyed up by revenues brought in by tax farming, the practice was discontinued in favour of centralized tax collection systems. In part this was because tax farming systems tended to rely on wealthy individuals outside the state machinery, gangs, and secret societies.

== Disadvantages ==
The key flaw in the tax farming system is the tension between the state, which seeks a long-term source of taxation revenue, and the tax farmers, who seek to make a profit on their investment in as short a time as possible. As a result, tax-farmers often abuse the taxpayers in various ways, tending them to switch their economic activity from strategic long-term projects to short-term revenue generation. In barter systems, tax farmers commonly undervalue taxes in kind, reselling the goods to create a second profit source. Such abuses stifle economic growth by restricting the ability of the tradesman to reinvest in his business, limiting the quantity of taxes generated over the long-term.

== Modern-day ==
=== Indian sub-continent ===
In Bangladesh and India tolls on bridges and roads and dues from public properties such as lakes and forests are often leased to private persons or firms.

=== United States of America ===
After the 2008 financial crisis, the city of Chicago needed money and a deal was made to sell all 36,000 of the parking meter spots in the city for 75 years for 1.15 billion dollars to a firm called Chicago Parking Meters.

== Disambiguation ==
=== Privatized tax collection ===
Tax farming is not synonymous with modern privatized tax collection, where private individuals or companies collect taxes and pass them to the state in return for a commission or fee, without bearing any risk consequent of default by the taxpayer. Tax farming is speculative, meaning that the tenant of the farm bears the full risk of defaulted debts. In addition, a tenant is often required as a term of the lease to make an early rent payment, which must be financed from his own resources until the revenue stream subject to the farm has started to be collected.

=== Factoring ===
In the United Kingdom, some tax collection of "lower value debts" by HMRC has been outsourced to debt collection agencies from July 2010. However, debt collection agencies, like invoice factors, are not truly farmers of revenue streams, as they do not bear any risk of default. Rather they make loans in expectation of future receipts, such loans being always recoverable and secured on the income stream itself.

=== Simple commutation ===
In 1999 the National Board of Revenue in Bangladesh (NBR) negotiated with cigarette producing firms a minimum amount of value added tax (VAT) that should be paid per month even though VAT is an ad valorem tax, that is to say of variable yield. The NBR took this step because under the self-clearance system monitoring of production and sales of cigarettes proved to be difficult. It was agreed that if the cigarette producing firms paid the minimum revenue fixed by the NBR, physical monitoring would be withdrawn. The NBR resorted to this technique of financial management to avoid the large costs of monitoring while gaining more in revenue with certainty.

== See also ==
- Fee farm grant
- Hollow state
- Maona
- Octroi
- Pacht: the system of tax farming in the Dutch East Indies
- Privatized tax collection
- Public-private partnership
