= Meerdervoort =

Historic municipality

Coordinates: 51°48′30″N 4°38′30″E

Meerdervoort is a former municipality in the Dutch province of South Holland. It was southwest of the town of Zwijndrecht.

The municipality existed between 1817 and 1855, when it merged with Zwijndrecht.
