= Octroi =

Local consumption tax

Octroi (French pronunciation: [ɔktʁwa]; Old French: octroyer, to grant, authorize; Lat. auctor) is a local tax collected on various articles brought into a district for consumption.

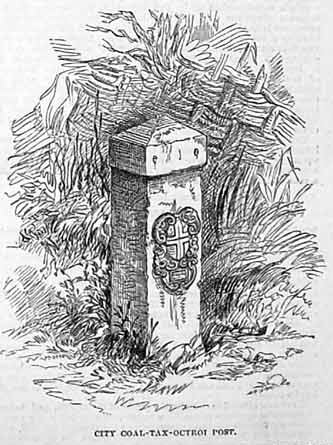
City Coal Tax Octroi Post in London, England

== Antiquity ==
The word itself is of French origin. Octroi taxes have a respectable antiquity, being known in Roman times as vectigalia. These were either the portorium, a tax on the entry from or departure to the provinces (those cities which were allowed to levy the portorium shared the profits with the public treasury); the ansarium or foricarium, a duty levied at the entrance to towns; or the edulia, sales imposts levied in markets. Vectigalia were levied on wine and certain articles of food, but cities were seldom allowed to use the whole of the profits of the taxes. Anglican Bishop Charles Ellicott suggested that the role of Matthew the tax collector in the gospels (Matthew 9:9) was "to collect the octroi levied on the fish, fruit, and other produce that made up the exports and imports of Capernaum" on the Sea of Galilee.

Vectigalia were introduced into Gaul by the Romans, and remained after the invasion by the Franks, under the name of tonlieux and coutumes. They were usually levied by the owners of seigniories.

== Middle Ages ==
During the 12th and 13th centuries, when the towns succeeded in asserting their independence, they at the same time obtained the recognition of their right to establish local taxation, and to have control of it. The royal power, however, gradually asserted itself, and it became the rule that permission to levy local taxes should be obtained from the king. From the 14th century onwards, there are numerous charters granting (octroyer) to French towns the right to tax themselves. The taxes did not remain strictly municipal, for an ordinance of Cardinal Mazarin (in 1647) ordered the proceeds of the octroi to be paid into the public treasury, and at other times the government claimed a certain percentage of the product, but this practice was finally abandoned in 1852.

== Tax farming ==
From an early time, octroi collection was farmed out to associations or private individuals; the tax farmers were organized into the Ferme générale, which built a wall around Paris in the late 18th century to enforce the octroi and other taxes. This system led to numerous abuses, which were sufficiently great that the octroi was abolished during the French Revolution. But such a drastic measure meant the stoppage of all municipal activities, and in 1798 Paris was allowed to re-establish its octroi. Other cities were allowed gradually to follow suit, and in 1809 a law was passed laying down the basis on which octrois might be established. Other laws were passed from time to time in France dealing with the octroi, in 1816, 1842, 1867, 1871, 1884, and 1897. By the law of 1809 octroi duties were allowed on beverages and liquids, food, fuel, forage, and building materials. A scale of rates was fixed, graduated according to the population, and farming out was strictly regulated. Under the law of 1816, an octroi could only be established at the wish of a municipal council, and only articles destined for local consumption could be taxed. The law of 1852 ended the payment of 10% of the gross receipts to the national treasury. Certain indispensable commodities were allowed to enter free, such as grain, flour, fruit, vegetables, and fish.

French octroi duties were collected by several procedures.

1. The regie simple, i.e. by special officers under the direction of the mayor. By the first decade of the 20th century more than half the octrois were collected this way, and this proportion tended to increase.
2. The bail à ferme, i.e. farming. The "tax farmer" was authorized to collect the octroi, and in return contracted to pay the municipality a yearly amount, based on the estimated revenues. Use of this method steadily decreased.
3. The regie interesse, a variation of the preceding method. The contractor paid the municipality a fixed annual sum, representing the municipality's share of estimated revenue, plus a share of revenues in excess of the estimate. This method had been practically abandoned by the first decade in the 20th century.
4. The abonnement avec la regie des contributions indirectes, under which a department of the treasury undertook to collect the duties. Use of this method was increasing by the first decade in the 20th century.

Gross octroi receipts in 1901 amounted to 11,132,870 francs. A law of 1897 created new sources of taxation, giving communes the option of:

1. New duties on alcohol.
2. A municipal license duty on retailers of beverages.
3. A special tax on wine in bottle.
4. Direct taxes on horses and carriages, clubs, billiard tables, and dogs.
5. Additional centimes to direct taxes.

From time to time there was agitation in France for the abolition of octroi duties, but it was never pushed very earnestly. In 1869, a commission considered the matter, and reported in favour of their retention. Octrois were finally abolished in 1948.

In Belgium, on the other hand, octrois were abolished in 1860, being replaced by an increase in customs and excise duties; and in 1903 those in Egypt were also abolished.

A similar tax, called the Alcabala, was collected in Spain and the Spanish colonies. This tax was in force in Mexico until a few years before the Mexican Revolution of 1910. In 1910, octroi duties still existed in Italy, Spain, Portugal, and some towns in Austria.

== Current ==
Octroi was still in use in the 1990s by local authorities in Pakistan for domestic goods movements. Although abolished for general trade in 1997, octroi was still being charged on certain commodities such as electricity as late as 2006. As of 2013, octroi is levied in Ethiopia.

Cities in the Indian state of Maharashtra briefly abolished octroi in 2013 and replaced it with local body tax. However, octroi was reestablished there in 2014, due to decreased revenues from the local body tax. As of 1 July 2017, with the introduction of GST country-wide, the octroi has been abolished.

In the United States, 45 states and the District of Columbia collect sales tax on goods sold within their jurisdictions, with 38 of these states having additional local sales taxes. To prevent tax avoidance, a use tax may be levied on goods used within a state purchased by residents outside the state without payment of sales tax (or payment of lesser sales tax). These taxes are typically self-reported or estimated as there are typically no customs controls or inspection when goods move across state lines. For example, in New York, residents must itemize use tax on untaxed purchases of greater than $1,000 when filing their income tax return, but may opt to pay a flat income-based amount for all purchases of less than $1,000.

== See also ==
- Coal-tax post
- Hollow state
- Tax farming
