= Privatized tax collection =

Privatized tax collection occurs wherever the state passes on its obligation to collect taxes to private companies or firms in return for a fixed or ad valorem fee. This contrasts with tax farming where a private individual or organization pays off a predetermined tax debt, and subsequently recoups that payment by collecting money from the people within a certain area or business.

A modern example of a variation of tax farming is the United States IRS outsourcing taxpayers debts to private debt collection agencies from September 2006. Opponents to this change note that the IRS will be handing over personal information to these debt collection agencies, who are being paid between twenty-two and twenty-four percent of the amount collected. Opponents are also worried about the agencies being paid on a percentage collected because it will encourage the collectors to use pressure tactics to collect the maximum amount. IRS spokesman Terry Lemons responds to these claims saying the new system "is a sound, balanced program that respects taxpayers' rights and taxpayer privacy." Currently there are other state and local agencies that are using private collection agencies and have not had any problems.

== Early history ==
Private tax collection had been attempted periodically in the United States, but a major program to formalize it was tried starting in 1872. In that year, Congress enabled contracts between private citizens and the Treasury Department to collect delinquent taxes for the Internal Revenue Service, with the collector entitled to retain fifty percent of the proceeds. It was found by the House Ways and Means Committee that one of the collectors, John D. Sanborn, used information already brought to light by government employees in his collections, and had listed in one of his contracts the names of every railroad in the United States as being liable to collection of taxes on certain dividends. The episode was called the Sanborn incident, and was tied to the resignation of William Adams Richardson as Secretary of the Treasury.

== Examples of companies that collected taxes ==
- Capita Group

== Privatization of tax collection ==
In essence, privatization of tax collection began when governments shifted from official assessment of the duties and taxes owed to the procedure of ‘’self-assessment’’ by the taxpayers. In this procedure, the tax-payer calculates his own tax liability and pays taxes based on that. Government verified genuineness of such self-assessment through a process of audit, which may be selective or blanket (applied to all tax-payers).

== Services of PSI companies ==
Pre-shipment inspection (PSI) agencies are companies that carry out physical inspection of the cargo and certify the value of the consignment after verification of the declared price against the ruling international price. Then the Customs authorities calculate the amount of duties and taxes owed on the basis of that certified value.This essentially has shifted the critical task of tax assessment to the PSI companies from the Customs inspectors and appraisers who were supposed to determine the assessable value of a consignment in accordance with the GATT Valuation Code.
