= German invasion of the Netherlands =

World War II military campaign in 1940

German invasion of the Netherlands "Duitse aanval op Nederland"
- Part of the Battle of France
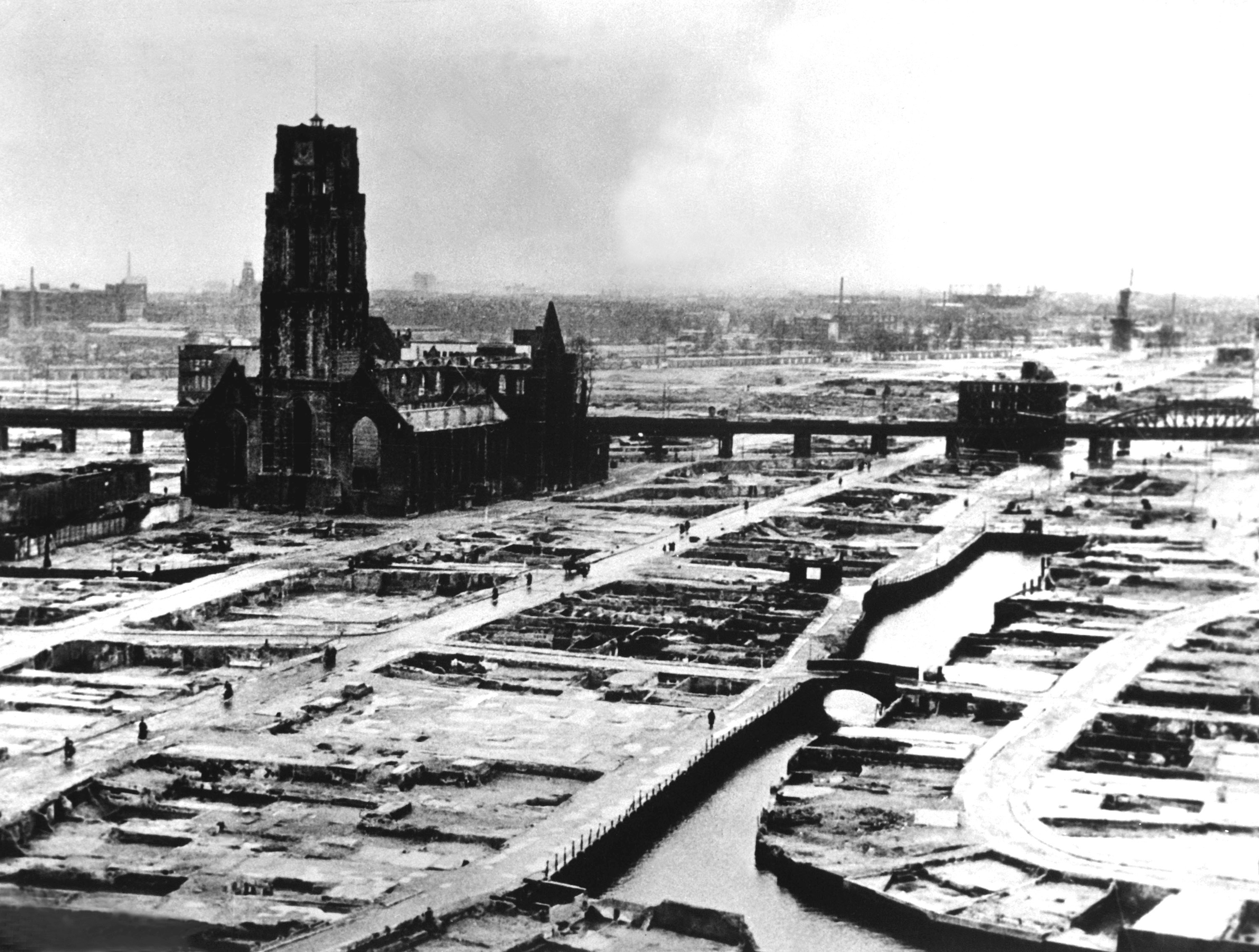
- The centre of Rotterdam destroyed after being bombed by the Luftwaffe
Date	10–17 May 1940 (1 week)
Location	Netherlands
Result	German victory

Belligerents
Netherlands; France; United Kingdom	Germany

Commanders and leaders
(Netherlands) Henri Winkelman (surrendered); (Netherlands) G. v. Voorst tot Voorst; (French Third Republic) Henri Giraud	(Nazi Germany) Fedor von Bock; (Nazi Germany) Hans von Sponeck

Strength
280,000 men (Dutch only) (9 divisions); 700 guns 1 tank 5 tankettes 32 armoured cars 145 aircraft	750,000 men (22 divisions); 1,378 guns 759 tanks 830 aircraft 6 armoured trains

Casualties and losses
(Netherlands) 2,332 killed (Netherlands) 7,000 wounded (France) 216 killed (United Kingdom) 43 killed	(Nazi Germany) 2,032 killed (Nazi Germany) 6,000–7,000 wounded (Nazi Germany) 4 armoured trains destroyed (Nazi Germany) 225–275 aircraft destroyed (Nazi Germany) 1,350 captured (sent to England)
- 2,000+ civilians killed

The German invasion of the Netherlands, (Note: (Dutch: Duitse aanval op Nederland)) otherwise known as the Battle of the Netherlands, (Note: (Dutch: Slag om Nederland)) was a military campaign, part of Case Yellow (German: Fall Gelb), the Nazi German invasion of the Low Countries (Belgium, Luxembourg, and the Netherlands) and France during World War II. The battle lasted from 10 May 1940 until the surrender of the main Dutch forces on 14 May. Dutch troops under French command in the far southwestern province of Zealand continued to resist the Wehrmacht until 17 May, when Germany completed its occupation of the whole country.

The invasion of the Netherlands saw some of the earliest mass paratroop drops, to occupy tactical points and assist the advance of ground troops. The German Luftwaffe used paratroopers in the capture of several airfields in the vicinity of Rotterdam and The Hague, helping to quickly overrun the country and immobilise Dutch forces.

After the devastating Nazi bombing of Rotterdam by the Luftwaffe on 14 May, the Germans threatened to bomb other Dutch cities if the Dutch forces refused to surrender. The General Staff knew it could not stop the bombers, and ordered the Royal Netherlands Army to cease hostilities. The last occupied parts of the Netherlands were liberated in 1945.

== Background ==
=== Prelude ===
On 1 September 1939, Nazi Germany began the Invasion of Poland. On 3 September, France and the UK declared war on Germany, but no major land operations occurred in Western Europe during the period known as the Phoney War in the winter of 1939–1940. During this time, the British and French built up their forces in expectation of a long war. Nazi Germany and the Stalin regime had signed the Molotov–Ribbentrop Pact and completed their conquest of Poland in September 1939. On 9 October 1939, Adolf Hitler ordered plans to be made for an invasion of the Low Countries, to use them as a base against Great Britain and to pre-empt a similar attack by Western Allied forces, which could threaten the vital Ruhr Area. A joint Dutch-Belgian peace offer between the two sides was rejected on 7 November.

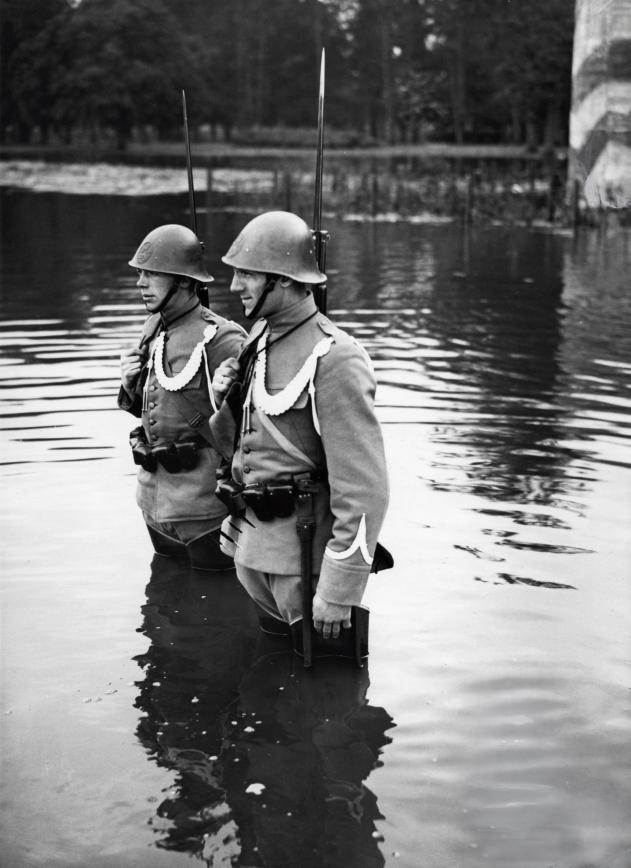
Dutch soldiers on guard, November 1939

The Netherlands Armed Forces were ill-prepared to resist such an invasion. When the Hitler regime came to power, the Dutch had begun to re-arm, but more slowly than France or Belgium; only in 1936 did the defence budget start to be gradually increased. Successive Dutch governments tended to avoid openly identifying Nazi Germany as an acute military threat. Partly this was caused by a wish not to antagonise a vital trade partner, even to the point of repressing criticism of Nazi policies; partly it was made inevitable by a policy of strict budgetary limits with which the conservative Dutch governments tried in vain to fight the Great Depression, which hit Dutch society particularly hard. Hendrikus Colijn, Prime Minister of the Netherlands between 1933 and 1939, was personally convinced that Germany would not violate Dutch neutrality; senior officers made no effort to mobilise public opinion in favour of improving military defence.

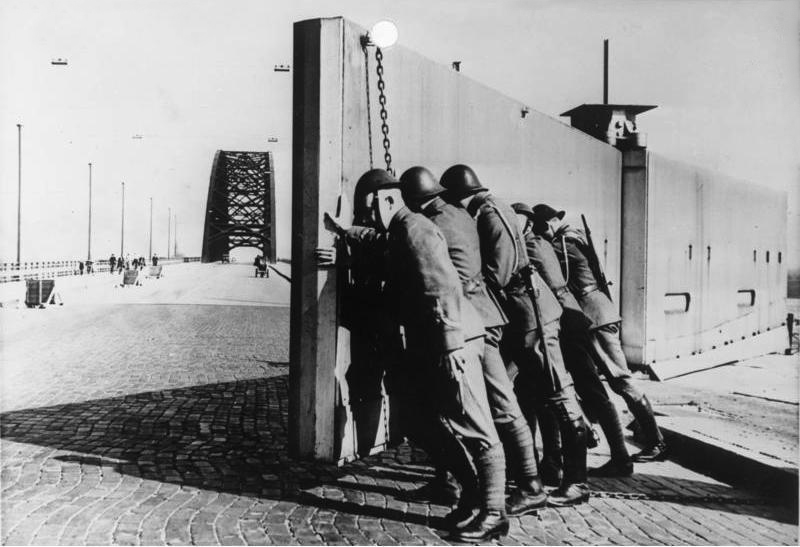
Dutch troops close the barrier of the Nijmegen Waal bridge during the Albania crisis.

International tensions grew since 1936: crises were caused by the German occupation of the Rhineland in March 1936; the Anschluss in March 1938, the Sudeten crisis in autumn 1938; the German occupation of Bohemia and Moravia in March 1939 and the Italian invasion of Albania in April 1939. These events forced the Dutch government to exercise greater vigilance, but they limited their reaction as much as they could. The most important measure was a partial mobilisation of 100,000 men in April 1939.

After the German invasion of Poland in September 1939 and the ensuing outbreak of the Second World War, the Netherlands hoped to remain neutral, as it had done during World War I 25 years earlier. To ensure this neutrality, the Dutch army was mobilised from 24 August and entrenched. Large sums (almost 900 million guilders) were spent on defence. It proved very difficult to obtain new matériel in wartime, however, especially as the Dutch had ordered some of their new equipment from Germany, which deliberately delayed deliveries. Moreover, a considerable part of the funds were intended for the Dutch East Indies (now Indonesia), much of it related to a plan to build three battlecruisers.

The strategic position of the Low Countries, located between France and Germany on the flanks of their fortification lines, made the area a logical route for an offensive by either side. In a 20 January 1940 radio speech, Winston Churchill tried to convince them not to wait for an inevitable German attack, but to join the Anglo-French Entente. The governments of Belgium (Hubert Pierlot was PM since 22. February 1939) and the Netherlands (Second De Geer cabinet) refused, even though the German attack plans had fallen into Belgian hands after a German aircraft crash in January 1940, in what became known as the Mechelen Incident.

The French supreme command considered violating the neutrality of the Low Countries if they had not joined the Anglo-French coalition before the planned large Entente offensive in the summer of 1941, but the French Cabinet, fearing a negative public reaction, vetoed the idea. Kept in consideration was a plan to invade if Germany attacked the Netherlands alone, necessitating an Entente advance through Belgium, or if the Netherlands assisted the enemy by tolerating a German advance into Belgium through the southern part of their territory, both possibilities discussed as part of the hypothèse Hollande. The Dutch government never officially formulated a policy on how to act in case of either contingency; the majority of ministers preferred to resist an attack, while a minority and Queen Wilhelmina refused to become a German ally whatever the circumstances. The Dutch tried on several occasions to act as an intermediary to reach a negotiated peace settlement between the Entente and Germany.

After the German invasions of Denmark and of Norway, followed by a warning by the new Japanese naval attaché Captain Tadashi Maeda that a German attack on the Netherlands was certain, it became clear to the Dutch military that staying out of the conflict might prove impossible. They started to fully prepare for war, both mentally and physically. Dutch border troops were put on greater alert. Reports of the presumed actions of a fifth column in Scandinavia caused widespread fears that the Netherlands too had been infiltrated by German agents assisted by traitors. Countermeasures were taken against a possible assault on airfields and ports. A state of emergency was declared on 19 April. However, most civilians still cherished the illusion that their country might be spared, an attitude that has since been described as a state of denial. The Dutch hoped that the restrained policy of the Entente and Central Powers during the First World War might be repeated and tried to avoid the attention of the Great Powers and a war in which they feared a loss of human life comparable to that of the previous conflict. On 10 April, Britain and France repeated their request that the Dutch enter the war on their side, but were again refused.

=== Dutch forces ===
==== Royal Netherlands Army ====
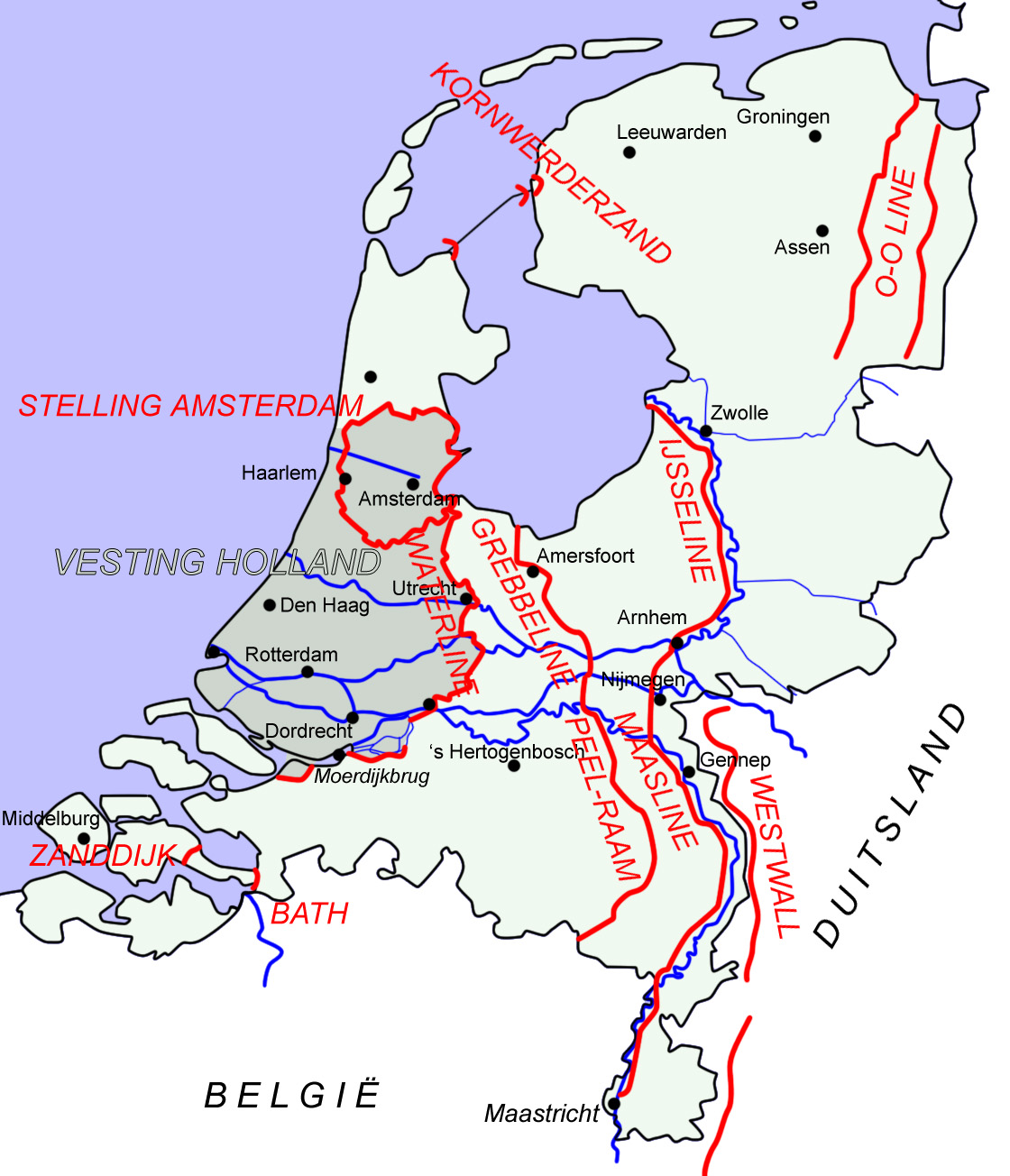
Major Dutch defence lines

In the Netherlands, all the objective conditions were present for a successful defence: a dense population, wealthy, young, disciplined and well-educated; a geography favouring the defender; and a strong technological and industrial base including an armaments industry. However, these had not been exploited: while the Wehrmacht at the time still had many shortcomings in equipment and training, the Dutch army, by comparison, was far less prepared for war. The myth of the general German equipment advantage over the opposing armies in the Battle of France was in fact a reality in the case of the Battle of the Netherlands. Germany had a modern army with tanks and dive bombers (such as the Junkers Ju 87 Stuka), while the Netherlands had an army whose armoured forces comprised only 39 armoured cars and five tankettes, and an air force in large part consisting of biplanes. The Dutch government's attitude towards war was reflected in the state of the country's armed forces, which had not significantly expanded their equipment since before the First World War, and were inadequately armed even by the standards of 1918. An economic recession lasting from 1920 until 1927 and the general détente in international relations caused a limitation of the defence budget. In that decade, only 1.5 million guilders per annum was spent on equipment. Both in 1931 and 1933, commissions appointed to economise even further failed, because they concluded that the acceptable minimum had been reached and advised that a spending increase was urgently needed. Only in February 1936 was a bill passed creating a special 53.4 million guilder defence fund.

The lack of a trained manpower base, a large professional organisation, or sufficient matériel reserves precluded a swift expansion of Dutch forces. There was just enough artillery to equip the larger units: eight infantry divisions (combined in four Army Corps), one Light (i.e. motorised) Division and two independent brigades (Brigade A and Brigade B), each with the strength of half a division or five battalions. All other infantry combat unit troops were raised as light infantry battalions that were dispersed all over the territory to delay enemy movement. About two thousand pillboxes had been constructed, but in lines without any depth. Modern large fortresses like the Belgian stronghold of Eben Emael were nonexistent; the only modern fortification complex was that at Kornwerderzand, guarding the Afsluitdijk. Total Dutch forces equalled 48 regiments of infantry as well as 22 infantry battalions for strategic border defence. In comparison, Belgium, despite a smaller and more aged male population, fielded 22 full divisions and the equivalent of 30 divisions when smaller units were included.

After September 1939, desperate efforts were made to improve the situation, but with very little result. Germany, for obvious reasons, delayed its deliveries; France was hesitant to equip an army that would not unequivocally take its side. The one abundant source of readily available weaponry, the Soviet Union, was inaccessible because the Dutch, contrary to most other nations, did not recognise the communist regime. An attempt in 1940 to procure Soviet armour captured by Finland failed.

On 10 May, the most conspicuous deficiency of the Dutch Army lay in its shortage of armour. Whereas the other major participants all had a considerable armoured force, the Netherlands had not been able to obtain the minimum of 146 modern tanks (110 light, 36 medium) they had already considered necessary in 1937. A single Renault FT tank, for which just one driver had been trained and which had the sole task of testing antitank obstacles, had remained the only example of its kind and was no longer in service by 1940. There were two squadrons of armoured cars, each with a dozen Landsverk M36 or M38 vehicles. Another dozen DAF M39 cars were in the process of being taken into service, some still having to be fitted with their main armament. A single platoon of five Carden-Loyd Mark VI tankettes used by the Artillery completed the list of Dutch armour.

The Dutch Artillery had available a total of 676 howitzers and field guns: 310 Krupp 75 mm field guns, partly produced in licence; 52 105 mm Bofors howitzers, the only really modern pieces; 144 obsolete Krupp 125 mm guns; 40 150 mm sFH13's; 72 Krupp 150 mm L/24 howitzers and 28 Vickers 152 mm L/15 howitzers. As antitank-guns 386 Böhler 47 mm L/39s were available, which were effective weapons but too few in number, being only at a third of the planned strength; another three hundred antiquated 6 Veld (57 mm) and 8 cm staal (84 mm) field guns performed the same role for the covering forces. Only eight of the 120 modern 105 mm pieces ordered from Germany had been delivered at the time of the invasion. Most artillery was horse-drawn. Volunteers were equipped with Oerlikon 20 mm cannons for air defence.

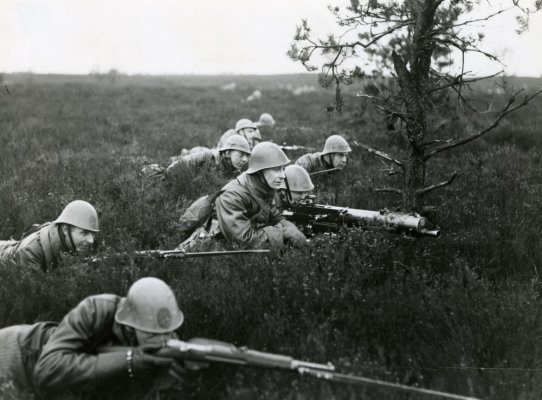
Light Division conducting an exercise with the Schwarzlose after mobilization

The Dutch Infantry used about 2,200 7.92 mm Schwarzlose M.08 machine guns, partly licence produced, and eight hundred Vickers machine guns. Many of these were fitted in the pillboxes; each battalion had a heavy machine gun company of twelve. The Dutch infantry squads were equipped with an organic light machine gun, the M.20 Lewis machine gun, of which about eight thousand were available. Most Dutch infantry were equipped with the Geweer M.95 rifle, adopted in 1895. There were but six 80 mm mortars for each regiment. This lack of firepower seriously impaired the fighting performance of the Dutch infantry.

Despite the Netherlands being the seat of Philips, one of Europe's largest producers of radio equipment, the Dutch army mostly used telephone connections; only the Artillery had been equipped with the modest number of 225 radio sets.

==== Dutch air forces ====
The Dutch air force, which was not an independent arm of the Dutch armed forces, but part of the Army, on 10 May operated a fleet of 155 aircraft: 28 Fokker G.1 twin-engine heavy fighters; 31 Fokker D.XXI and seven Fokker D.XVII fighters; ten twin-engined Fokker T.V, fifteen Fokker C.X and 35 Fokker C.V light bombers, twelve Douglas DB-8 dive bombers (used as fighters) and seventeen Koolhoven FK-51 reconnaissance aircraft—thus 74 of the 155 aircraft were biplanes. Of these aircraft 125 were operational. Of the remainder the air force school used three Fokker D.XXI, six Fokker D.XVII, a single Fokker G.I, a single Fokker T.V and seven Fokker C.V, along with several training aeroplanes. Another forty operational aircraft served with the Marineluchtvaartdienst (naval air service) along with about an equal number of reserve and training craft. The production potential of the Dutch military aircraft industry, consisting of Fokker and Koolhoven, was not fully exploited due to budget limitations.

==== Training and readiness ====
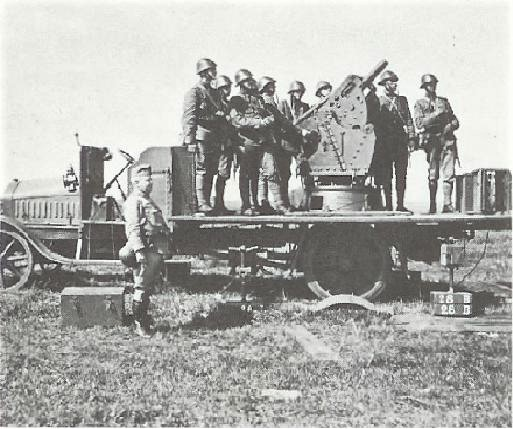
Dutch mobile anti-aircraft gun

Not only was the Royal Netherlands Army poorly equipped, it was also poorly trained. A particular problem was the absence of experience gained in the handling of larger units above the battalion level. From 1932 until 1936, the Dutch Army did not hold summer field manoeuvres in order to conserve military funding. Adding to this shortcoming, the individual soldier lacked many necessary skills. Before the war only a minority of young men eligible to serve in the military had actually been conscripted. Until 1938, those who were enlisted only served for 24 weeks, just enough to receive basic infantry training. That same year, service time was increased to eleven months. The low quality of conscripts was not compensated for by the presence of a large body of professional military personnel. In 1940, there were only 1206 professional officers present. It had been hoped that when war threatened, these deficiencies could be quickly remedied, but following the mobilisation of all Dutch forces on 28 August 1939 (bringing Army strength to about 280,000 men) readiness only slowly improved: most available time for improving training was spent constructing defences. During this period, munition shortages limited live fire training, while unit cohesion remained low. By its own standards the Dutch Army in May 1940 was unfit for battle. It was incapable of staging an offensive, even at division level, while executing manoeuvre warfare was far beyond its capacities.

German generals and tacticians (along with Hitler himself) had an equally low opinion of the Dutch military and expected that the core region of Holland proper could be conquered in about three to five days.

=== Dutch defensive strategy ===
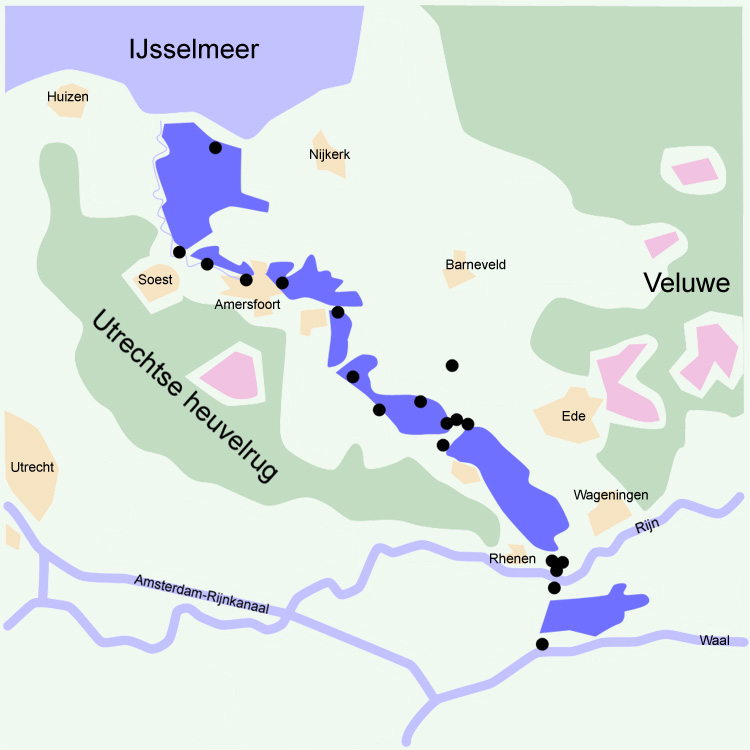
The Grebbe Line, a forward defence line of the Dutch Waterline, is shown in dark blue.

In the 17th century, the Dutch Republic had devised a defensive system called the Hollandic Water Line, which during the Franco-Dutch War protected all major cities in the west, by flooding part of the countryside. In the early 19th century this line was shifted somewhat to the east, beyond Utrecht, and later modernised with fortresses. This new position was called the New Hollandic Water Line. The line was reinforced with new pillboxes in 1940 as the fortifications were outdated. The line was located at the extreme eastern edge of the area lying below sea level. This allowed the ground before the fortifications to be easily inundated with a few feet of water, too shallow for boats, but deep enough to turn the soil into an impassable quagmire. The area west of the New Hollandic Water Line was called Fortress Holland (Dutch: Vesting Holland; German: Festung Holland), the eastern flank of which was also covered by Lake IJssel and the southern flank protected by the lower course of three broad parallel rivers: the Meuse (Maas) and two branches of the Rhine. It functioned as a National Redoubt, which was expected to hold out a prolonged period of time, in the most optimistic predictions as much as three months without any allied assistance, even though the size of the attacking German force was strongly overestimated. Before the war the intention was to fall back to this position almost immediately, after a concentration phase (the so-called Case Blue) in the Gelderse Valley, inspired by the hope that Germany would only travel through the southern provinces on its way to Belgium and leave Holland proper untouched. In 1939 it was understood such an attitude posed an invitation to invade and made it impossible to negotiate with the Entente about a common defence. Proposals by German diplomats that the Dutch government would secretly assent to an advance into the country were rejected.

From September 1939 a more easterly Main Defence Line (MDL) was constructed. This second main defensive position had a northern part formed by the Grebbelinie (Grebbe line), located at the foothills of the Utrechtse Heuvelrug, an Ice Age moraine between Lake IJssel and the Lower Rhine. It was dug on instigation of the commander of the Field Army Lieutenant-General Jan Joseph Godfried baron van Voorst tot Voorst. This line was extended by a southern part: the Peel-Raamstelling (Peel-Raam Position), located between the Maas and the Belgian border along the Peel Marshes and the Raam River, as ordered by the Dutch Commander in Chief, General Izaak H. Reijnders. In the south the intention was to delay the Germans as much as possible to cover a French advance. Fourth and Second Army Corps were positioned at the Grebbe Line; Third Army Corps were stationed at the Peel-Raam Position with the Light Division behind it to cover its southern flank. Brigade A and B were positioned between the Lower Rhine and the Maas. First Army Corps was a strategic reserve in the Fortress Holland, the southern perimeter of which was manned by another ten battalions and the eastern by six battalions. All these lines were reinforced by pillboxes.

==== Positioning of troops ====
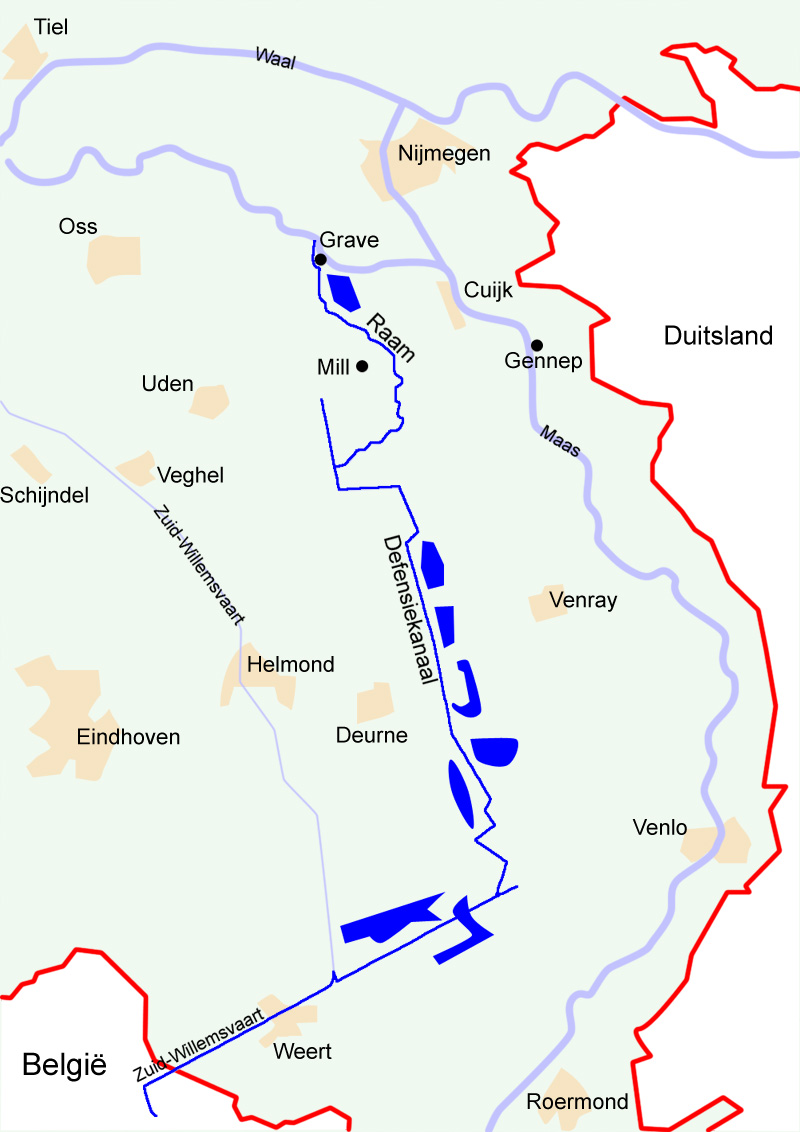
The Peel-Raam Position

In front of this Main Defence Line was the IJssel-Maaslinie, a covering line along the rivers IJssel and Meuse (Maas), connected by positions in the Betuwe, again with pillboxes and lightly occupied by a screen of fourteen "border battalions". Late in 1939 General Van Voorst tot Voorst, reviving plans he had already worked out in 1937, proposed to make use of the excellent defensive opportunities these rivers offered. He proposed a shift to a more mobile strategy by fighting a delaying battle at the plausible crossing sites near Arnhem and Gennep to force the German divisions to spend much of their offensive power before they had reached the MDL, and ideally even defeat them. This was deemed too risky by the Dutch government and General Reijnders. The latter wanted the army to first offer heavy resistance at the Grebbe Line and Peel-Raam Position, and then fall back to the Fortress Holland. This also was considered too dangerous by the government, especially in light of German air supremacy, and had the disadvantage of having to fully prepare two lines. Reijnders had already been denied full military authority in the defence zones; the conflict about strategy further undermined his political position. On 5 February 1940 he was forced to offer his resignation because of these disagreements with his superiors. He was replaced by General Henry G. Winkelman who decided that in the north the Grebbe Line would be the main defence line where the decisive battle was to be waged, partly because it would there be easier to break out with a counteroffensive if the conditions were favourable. However, he took no comparable decision regarding the Peel-Raam Position.

During the Phoney War the Netherlands officially adhered to a policy of strict neutrality. In secret, the Dutch military command, partly acting on its own accord, negotiated with both Belgium and France via the Dutch military attaché in Paris, Lieutenant-Colonel David van Voorst Evekink to co-ordinate a common defence to a German invasion. This failed because of insurmountable differences of opinion about the question of which strategy to follow.

==== Coordinating with Belgium ====
Given its obvious strategic importance, Belgium, though in principle neutral, had already made quite detailed arrangements for co-ordination with Entente troops. This made it difficult for the Dutch to have these plans changed again to suit their wishes. The Dutch desired the Belgians to connect their defences to the Peel-Raam Position, that Reijnders refused to abandon without a fight. He did not approve of a plan by Van Voorst tot Voorst to occupy a so-called "Orange Position" on the much shorter line 's-Hertogenbosch–Tilburg, to form a continuous front with the Belgian lines near Turnhout as proposed by Belgian General Raoul Van Overstraeten.

When Winkelman took over command, he intensified the negotiations, proposing on 21 February that Belgium would man a connecting line with the Peel-Raam Position along the Belgian part of the Zuid-Willemsvaart. The Belgians refused to do this unless the Dutch reinforced their presence in Limburg; the Dutch had no forces available with which to fulfill this request. Repeated Belgian requests to reconsider the Orange Position were refused by Winkelman. Therefore, the Belgians decided to withdraw, in the event of an invasion, all their troops to their main defence line, the Albert Canal. This created a dangerous gap forty kilometres wide. The French were invited to fill it. The French Commander in Chief General Maurice Gamelin was more than interested in including the Dutch in his continuous front as—like Major-General Bernard Montgomery four years later—he hoped to circle around the Westwall when the Entente launched its planned 1941 offensive. But he did not dare to stretch his supply lines that far unless the Belgians and Dutch would take the allied side before the German attack. When both nations refused, Gamelin made it clear that he would occupy a connecting position near Breda. The Dutch did not fortify this area. In secret, Winkelman decided on 30 March to abandon the Peel-Raam Position immediately at the onset of a German attack and withdraw his Third Army Corps to the Linge to cover the southern flank of the Grebbe Line, leaving only a covering force behind. This Waal-Linge Position was to be reinforced with pillboxes; the budget for such structures was increased with a hundred million guilders.

After the German attack on Denmark and Norway in April 1940, when the Germans used large numbers of airborne troops, the Dutch command became worried about the possibility they too could become the victim of such a strategic assault. To repulse an attack, five infantry battalions were positioned at the main ports and airbases, such as The Hague airfield of Ypenburg and the Rotterdam airfield of Waalhaven. These were reinforced by additional AA-guns, two tankettes and twelve of the 24 operational armoured cars. These specially directed measures were accompanied by more general ones: the Dutch had posted no less than 32 hospital ships throughout the country and fifteen trains to help make troop movements easier.

=== French strategy ===
In addition to the Dutch Army and the German 18th Army, a third force, not all that much smaller than either, would operate on Dutch soil: the French 7th Army. It had its own objectives within the larger French strategy, and French planning had long considered the possibility of operations in Dutch territory. The coastal regions of Zealand and Holland were difficult to negotiate because of their many waterways. However, both the French and the Germans saw the possibility of a surprise flanking attack in this region. For the Germans this would have the advantage of bypassing the Antwerp-Namur line. The Zealand Isles were considered to be strategically critical, as they are just opposite the Thames estuary, so their capture would pose a special menace to the safety of England.

Rapid forces, whether for an offensive or defensive purpose, were needed to deny vital locations to the enemy. Long before the Germans did, the French had contemplated using airborne troops to achieve speedy attacks. As early as 1936 the French had commissioned the design of light airborne tanks, but these plans had been abandoned in 1940, as they possessed no cargo planes large enough to carry them. A naval division and an infantry division were earmarked to depart for Zealand to block the Western Scheldt against a German crossing. These would send forward forces over the Scheldt estuary into the Isles, supplied by overseas shipping.

French Commander in Chief General Maurice Gamelin feared the Dutch would be tempted into a quick capitulation or even an acceptance of German protection. He therefore reassigned the former French strategic reserve, the 7th Army, to operate in front of Antwerp to cover the river's eastern approaches in order to maintain a connection with the Fortress Holland further to the north and preserve an allied left flank beyond the Rhine. The force assigned to this task consisted of the 16th Army Corps, comprising the 9th Motorised Infantry Division (also possessing some tracked armoured vehicles) and the 4th Infantry Division; and the 1st Army Corps, consisting of the 25th Motorised Infantry Division and the 21st Infantry Division. This army was later reinforced by the 1st Mechanised Light Division, an armoured division of the French Cavalry and a first-class powerful unit. Together with the two divisions in Zealand, seven French divisions were dedicated to the operation.

Although the French troops would have a higher proportion of motorised units than their German adversaries, in view of the respective distances to be covered, they could not hope to reach their assigned sector advancing in battle deployment before the enemy did. Their only prospect of beating the Germans to it lay in employing rail transport. This implied they would be vulnerable in the concentration phase, building up their forces near Breda. They needed the Dutch troops in the Peel-Raam Position to delay the Germans for a few extra days to allow a French deployment and entrenchment, but French rapid forces also would provide a security screen. These consisted of the reconnaissance units of the armoured and motorised divisions, equipped with the relatively well-armed Panhard 178 armoured car. These would be concentrated into two task forces named after their commander: the Groupe Beauchesne and the Groupe Lestoquoi.

=== German strategy and forces ===
During the many changes in the operational plans for Fall Gelb the idea of leaving the Fortress Holland alone, just as the Dutch hoped for, was at times considered. The first version of 19 October 1939 suggested the possibility of a full occupation if conditions were favourable. In the version of 29 October it was proposed to limit the transgression to a line south of Venlo. In the Holland-Weisung (Holland Directive) of 15 November it was decided to conquer the entire south, but in the north to advance no further than the Grebbe Line, and to occupy the Frisian Islands. Hermann Göring insisted on a full conquest, for he needed the Dutch airfields against Britain; also, he was afraid that the Entente might reinforce Fortress Holland after a partial defeat and use the airfields to bomb German cities and troops. Another rationale for complete conquest was that, as the fall of France itself could hardly be taken for granted, it was for political reasons seen as desirable to obtain a Dutch capitulation, because a defeat might well bring less hostile governments to power in Britain and France. A swift defeat would also free troops for other front sectors.

Though it was thus on 17 January 1940 decided to conquer the whole of the Netherlands, few units could be made available for this task. The main effort of Fall Gelb would be made in the centre, between Namur and Sedan, France. The attack on central Belgium was only a feint—and the attack on Fortress Holland only a sideshow of this feint. Although both the 6th and 18th Army were deployed on the Dutch border, the first, much larger, force would move south of Venlo to Belgium, leaving just the 18th Army under General Georg von Küchler to defeat the Dutch main force. Of all German armies to take part in the operation, this was by far the weakest. It contained only four regular infantry divisions (the 207th, 227th, 254th and 256th Infantry Division), assisted by three reserve divisions (208th, 225th, and 526th Infantry Division) that would not take part in the fighting. Six of these divisions were "Third Wave" units only raised in August 1939 from territorial Landwehr units. They had few professional officers and little fighting experience apart from those who were World War I veterans. Like the Dutch Army, most soldiers (88%) were insufficiently trained. The seventh division was the 526th Infantry Division, a pure security unit without serious combat training. The German divisions, with a nominal strength of 17,807 men, were fifty percent larger than their Dutch counterparts and possessed twice their effective firepower, but even so the necessary numerical superiority for a successful offensive was simply lacking.

To remedy this, assorted odds and ends were used to reinforce 18th Army. The first of these was the only German cavalry division, the aptly named 1st Kavalleriedivision. These mounted troops, accompanied by some infantry, were to occupy the weakly defended provinces east of the river IJssel and then try to cross the Afsluitdijk (Enclosure Dike). A simultaneous landing in Holland near Enkhuizen was to be attempted, using barges to be captured in the small port of Stavoren. As both efforts were unlikely to succeed, the mass of regular divisions was reinforced by the SS-Verfügungsdivision (including SS-Standarten Der Führer, Deutschland and Germania) and Leibstandarte Adolf Hitler, which would serve as assault infantry to breach the Dutch fortified positions. Still this added only 1 1/3 division to the equation.

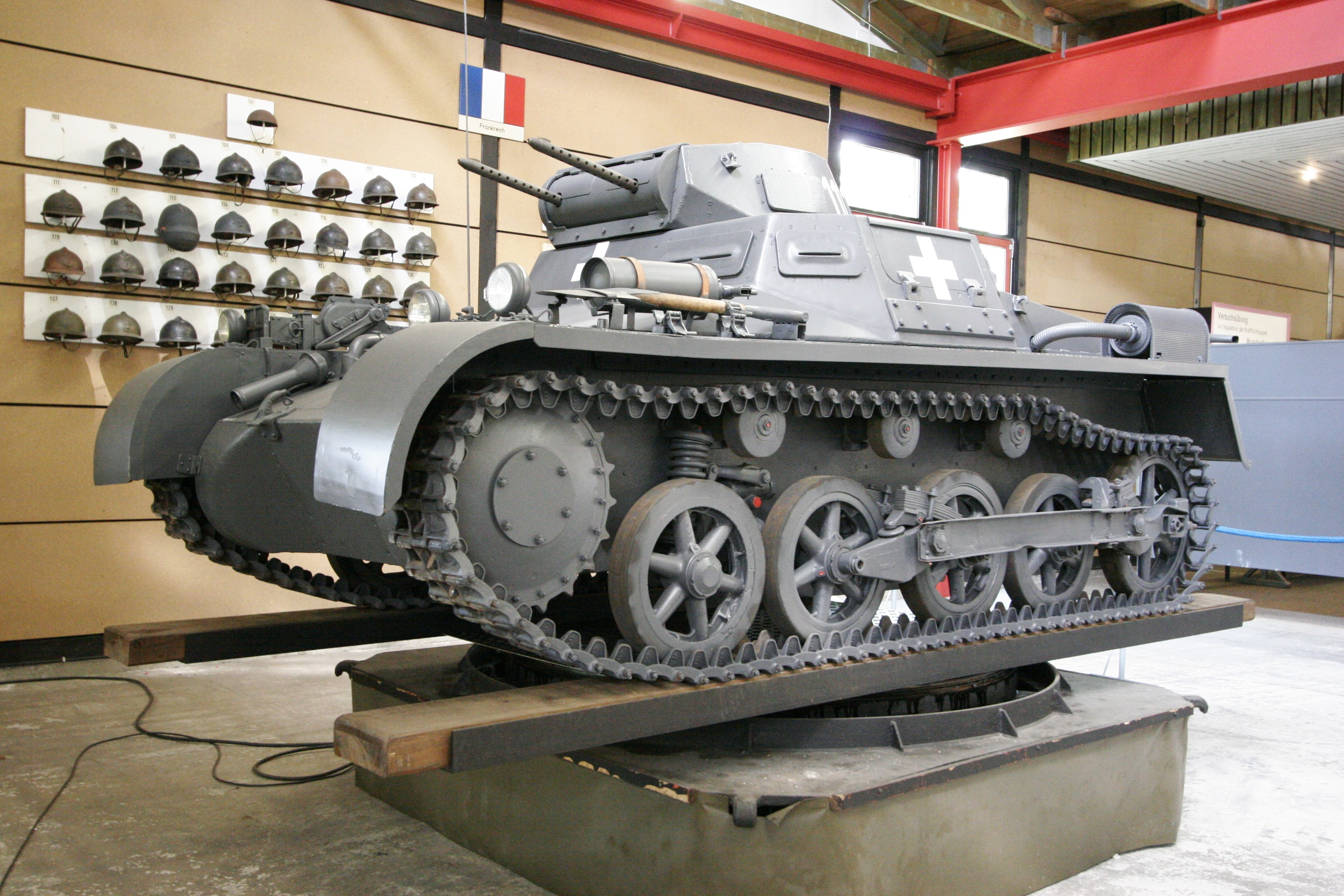
Panzer I tank, now on display in the German Tank Museum, Munster, Germany (2005)

To ensure a victory the Germans resorted to unconventional means. The Germans had trained two airborne/airlanding assault divisions. The first of these, the 7. Flieger-Division, consisted of paratroopers; the second, the 22nd Luftlande-Infanteriedivision, of airborne infantry. Initially the plan was that the main German assault was to take place in Flanders, and it was expected these troops would be used for a crossing attempt over the river Scheldt near Ghent. This operation was cancelled, so it was decided to use them to obtain an easy victory in the Netherlands. The airborne troops would on the first day attempt to secure the airfields around the Dutch seat of government, The Hague, and then capture that government, together with the Dutch High Command and Queen Wilhelmina. German officers actually took lessons on how to address royalty on such occasions. The plan, Fall Festung, had been developed by Hitler personally, embellishing an earlier idea to let an envoy offer "armed protection of the Dutch neutrality", that is, to become a German protectorate.

In the event this did not bring forth the desired immediate collapse, the bridges at Rotterdam, Dordrecht and Moerdijk would simultaneously be secured to allow a mechanised force to relieve the airborne troops from the south. This force was to be the German 9th Panzer Division. This was the only German armoured division having just two tank battalions, one understrength, in its single tank regiment; the total number of tanks in the unit was 141. The intention was that it should exploit a breach in the Dutch lines created by the 254th and 256th Infantry Division, and join up with them, forming the XXVI. Armeekorps, on the Gennep – 's-Hertogenbosch axis. At the same time an offensive would be staged against the Grebbe Line in the east by the 207th and 227th Infantry Division, united to form X. Armeekorps, to engage the main bulk of the Dutch Field Army. The expectation was that in spite of the lack of numerical superiority, they would force the Dutch back to the east front of the Fortress Holland or beyond. If the Dutch did not capitulate on the first day, the Eighteenth Army expected to enter the Fortress Holland on the third day from the south over the Moerdijk bridges and thereby ensure victory; there was no strict timetable for the total destruction of the Dutch forces. A peculiar aspect of the command structure was that the airborne attack was solely a Luftwaffe operation; the airborne forces would initially not be under operational command of the German Army. The attack on Rotterdam was ultimately to be an Army operation and considered by it as the Schwerpunkt (focal point) of the campaign in the Netherlands; 18th Army saw the air landings as primarily subservient to the XXVI. Armeekorps advance.

Of all operations of Fall Gelb this one most strongly embodied the concept of a Blitzkrieg as the term was then understood: a Strategischer Überfall or strategic assault. Also, like Fall Gelb as a whole, it involved a high risk strategy.

=== The Oster affair ===
The German population and troops generally disliked the idea of violating Dutch neutrality. German propaganda therefore justified the invasion as a reaction to a supposed Entente attempt to occupy the Low Countries, similar to the justification used by the German Empire to invade Belgium in World War I. Some German officers were averse to the Nazi regime and were also uneasy about the invasion.

One of them, Colonel Hans Oster (Note: Oster was a leading figure of the German resistance from 1938 to 1943, and was one of those hanged after the 20 July 1944 bomb plot to assassinate Hitler.), an Abwehr (German military intelligence) officer, began in March 1939 to pass along information to his friend, the Dutch military attaché in Berlin, Major Gijsbertus J. Sas. This information included the attack date of Fall Gelb. Sas informed the Allies via other military attachés. However, several postponements while the Germans waited for favourable weather conditions led to a series of false alarms, which left the Dutch government and others somewhat sceptical of the information. Sas' correct prediction of the date of the attack on Denmark and Norway went largely unheeded. Though he indicated a German armoured division would try to attack Fortress Holland from North Brabant and that there was a plan to capture the Queen, Dutch defensive strategy was not adapted and it was not understood these were elements of a larger scheme. On 4 May Sas again warned that an attack was imminent; this time it coincided with a warning from Pope Pius XII. When on the evening of 9 May Oster again phoned his friend saying just "Tomorrow, at dawn", Dutch troops were put on alert.

== Battle ==
=== 10 May ===
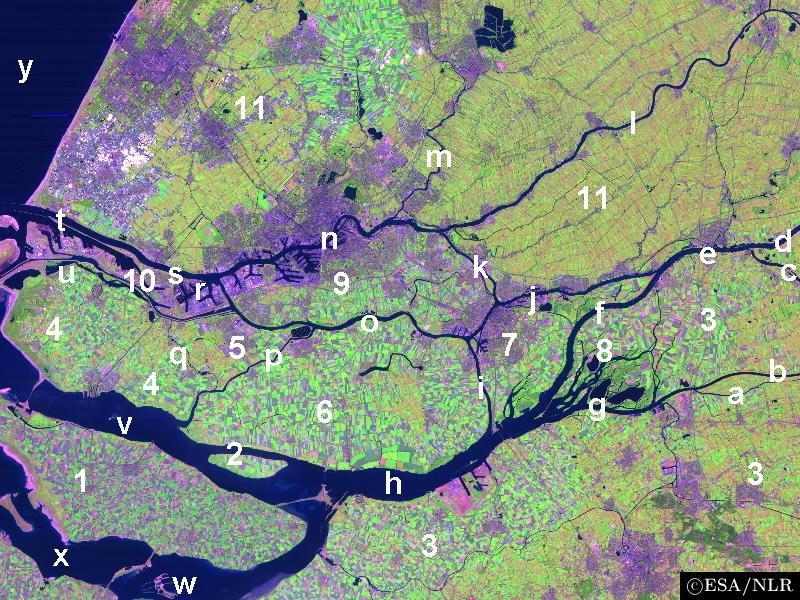
The geography of the landing areas: at the coast is The Hague; Rotterdam is at n, Waalhaven at 9 and Dordrecht at 7; h indicates the Hollands Diep

On the morning of 10 May 1940 the Dutch awoke to the sound of aircraft engines roaring in the sky. Germany had commenced Operation Fall Gelb and attacked the Netherlands, Belgium, France and Luxembourg, in the case of the Low Countries without a declaration of war given before hostilities; France was already at war.

In the night the Luftwaffe violated Dutch airspace. One wing, Kampfgeschwader 4 (KG 4), traversed it and then disappeared to the west, giving the Dutch the illusion that the operation was directed at England. But over the North Sea it turned to the east again to stage a surprise attack on the Dutch airfields, together with the other wings. Led by Oberst (Colonel) Martin Fiebig, KG 4 hit the naval airfield at De Kooy, destroying 35 aircraft, most of them trainers. Fiebig himself was shot down and spent five days as a Dutch prisoner of war. KG 4 also hit Amsterdam-Schiphol, where the Dutch lost a third of their medium bombers, and The Hague airfields where I./KG 4 destroyed half of the 21 defending fighters to assist Kampfgeschwader 30 (KG 30) and Kampfgeschwader 54 (KG 54) in attacks upon ports and communications. KG 4 lost 11 Heinkel He 111 bombers in total on 10 May and three Junkers Ju 88s; KG 30 and 54 another nine bombers. Jagdgeschwader 26 (JG 26) and Zerstörergeschwader 26 (ZG 26) shot down 25 Dutch aircraft in aerial combat for a loss of nine fighters, with Albert Kesselring's Luftflotte 2 in total claiming 41. The Dutch were left with just 70 aircraft by the end of the day. They claimed most of the German aircraft destroyed on 10 May. Spread out over Dutch territory, they continued to engage the Luftwaffe where possible, claiming 13 victories over German fighter aircraft by 14 May.

Immediately after the bombardments, between 04:30 and 05:00 local time, paratroopers were landed near the airfields. Dutch anti-aircraft batteries shot down numerous Ju 52 transport planes of the Luftwaffe's Transportgruppen and even more were wrecked during or after landing. German Ju 52 total losses in the entire battle amounted to 224, compared to 430 Ju 52s deployed by the airborne troops.

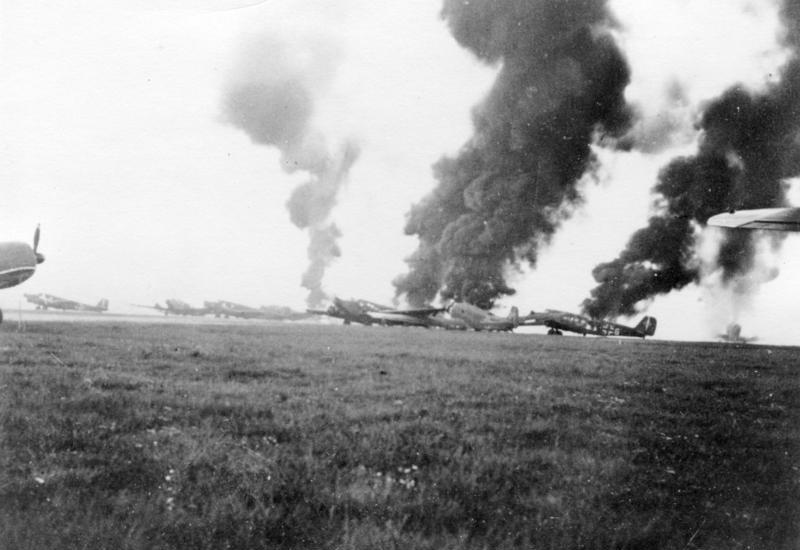
Burning German Junkers Ju 52s at Ypenburg

The attack on The Hague ended in operational failure. The paratroopers were unable to capture the main airfield at Ypenburg in time for the airborne infantry to land safely in their Junkers. Though one armoured car had been damaged by a bomb, the other five Landsverks, assisted by machine gun emplacements, destroyed the eighteen Junkers of the first two waves, killing many occupants. When the airstrip was blocked by wrecks the remaining waves aborted the landing and tried to find alternatives, often putting down their teams in meadows or on the beach, thus dispersing the troops. The small auxiliary airfield of Ockenburg was only lightly defended, and fell at once to German attack. The airfield of Valkenburg was likewise quickly occupied, the morale of the defenders shaken by the bombardment. However, the landing strip was still under construction and the ground water level had not yet been lowered: planes landing there sank away in the soft soil. None of the airfields were thus capable of receiving substantial reinforcements. In the end the paratroopers occupied Ypenburg but failed to advance into The Hague, their route blocked by hastily assembled Dutch troops. Early in the afternoon they were dispersed by fire from three Dutch artillery batteries. Dutch batteries likewise drove away the German occupants from the other two fields, the remnant airborne troops taking refuge in nearby villages and mansions.

The attack on Rotterdam was much more successful. Twelve Heinkel He 59 seaplanes, crowded with two platoons of troops, landed in the heart of the city and unloaded assault teams that captured the Willemsbrug, a bridge over the Nieuwe Maas, to form a bridgehead. At the same time the military airfield of Waalhaven, positioned south of the city on the island of IJsselmonde, was attacked by airborne forces. Here an infantry battalion was stationed, but so close to the airfield that the paratroopers landed near its positions. A confused fight followed. The first wave of Junkers suffered no losses and the transports continued to land. In the end the Dutch defenders were overwhelmed. The German troops, steadily growing in numbers, began to move to the east to occupy IJsselmonde and eventually made contact with the paratroopers tasked with occupying the vital bridge at Dordrecht. Although the Royal Netherlands Navy intervened—the torpedo boats Z5 and TM 51 attacked the Willemsbrug and later the destroyer HNLMS Van Galen sailed up the Nieuwe Waterweg to bombard the airfield at short range—this only resulted in the Van Galen foundering after being bombed. A plan to commit the gunboats HNLMS Flores and HNLMS Johan Maurits van Nassau was therefore abandoned. At the Island of Dordrecht the Dordrecht bridge was captured but in the city itself the garrison held out. The long Moerdijk bridges over the broad Hollands Diep estuary connecting the island to North Brabant province were captured and a bridgehead fortified on the southern side.

German landings in Rotterdam

The Germans, executing a plan approved by Hitler, tried to capture the IJssel and Maas bridges intact, using commando teams of Brandenburgers that began to infiltrate over the Dutch border ahead of the main advance, with some troops arriving on the evening of 9 May. During the night of 10 May they approached the bridges: several teams had a few men dressed as Dutch military police pretending to bring in a group of German prisoners, to fool the Dutch detonation teams. Some of these "military policemen" were real Dutchmen, members of the Nationaal-Socialistische Beweging, the Dutch Nazi party. Most of these attempts failed and the bridges were blown, on two occasions with Brandenburgers and all. The main exception was the Gennep railway bridge. Immediately an armoured train crossed it followed by a troop train, both driving right through the Peel-Raam Position at Mill and unloading an infantry battalion behind the defence line.

The Dutch released reports of German soldiers in disguise to the international news agencies. This caused a fifth column scare, especially in Belgium and France. However, unlike the situation later on in those two countries, in the Netherlands there was no mass exodus of civilian refugees, clogging the roads. Generally German soldiers behaved in a civilised manner towards the Dutch population, forming neat queues at the shops to buy goods rationed in Germany, such as chocolate.

After the generally failed assaults on the bridges, the German divisions began crossing attempts over the rivers IJssel and Maas. The first waves typically were destroyed, due to insufficient preparatory fire on the pillboxes. At most places a secondary bombardment destroyed the pillboxes and the infantry divisions crossed the river after building pontoon bridges; but at some, as Venlo, the attempt was aborted. At Arnhem, Leibstandarte Der Fuehrer led the assault and that day advanced to the Grebbe Line, followed by 207. Infanteriedivision.

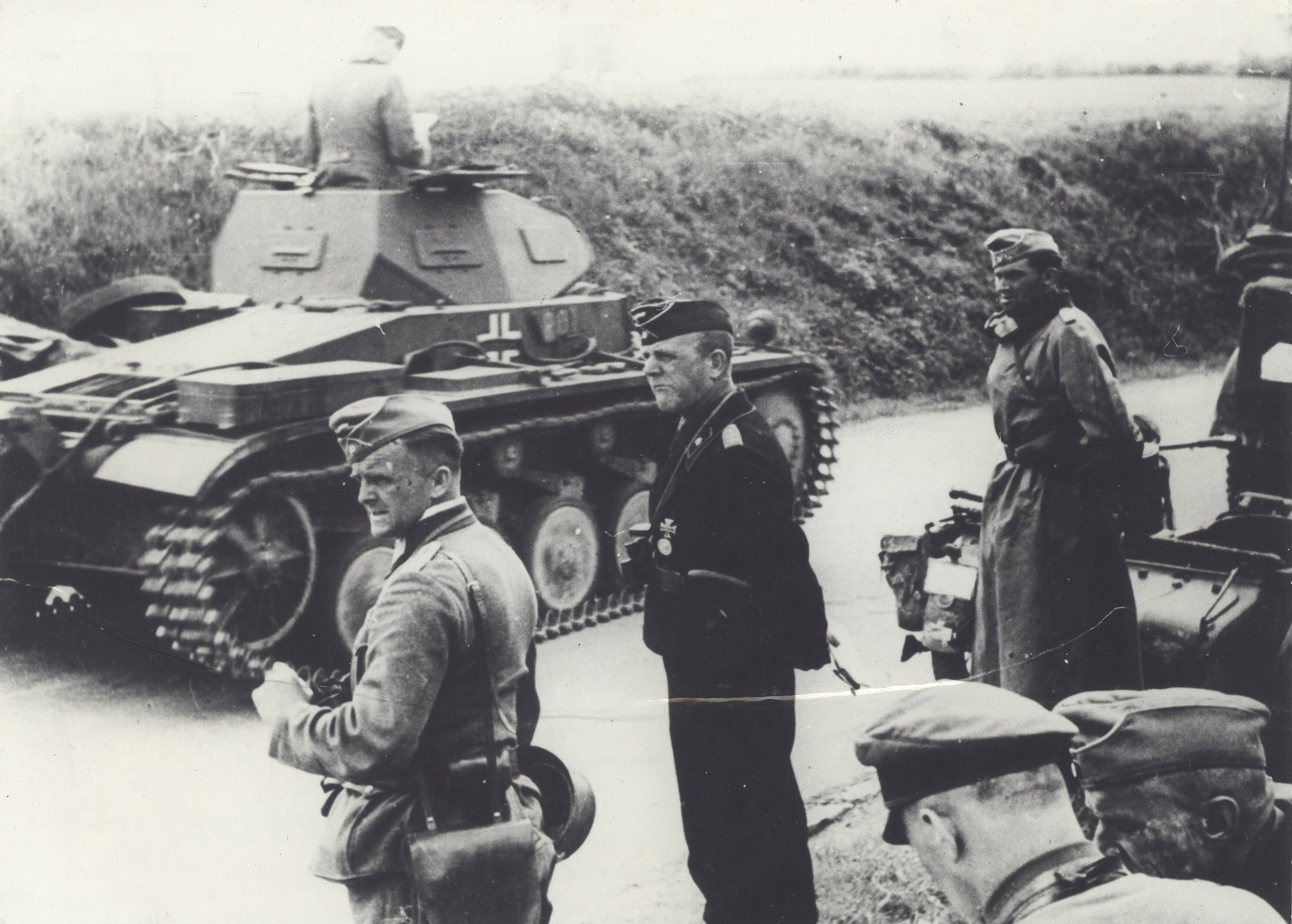
German tanks enter the Netherlands.

Even before the armoured train arrived, the Dutch 3rd Army Corps had already been planned to be withdrawn from behind the Peel-Raam Position, taking with it all the artillery apart from 36 8 Staal pieces. Each of its six regiments was to leave a battalion behind to serve as a covering force, together with fourteen "border battalions". The group was called the "Peel Division". This withdrawal was originally planned for the first night after the invasion, under cover of darkness, but due to the rapid German advance an immediate retreat was ordered at 06:45, to avoid the 3rd Army Corps becoming entangled with enemy troops. The corps joined "Brigade G", six battalions already occupying the Waal-Linge line, and was thus brought up to strength again. It would see no further fighting.

The Light Division, based at Vught, was the only manoeuvre force the Dutch Army possessed. Its planned withdrawal had been similarly executed a day early. Its regiments had biked over the Maas and Waal bridges and then turned left through the Alblasserwaard when it was decided in the afternoon to let it counterattack the German airborne landing on IJsselmonde. It reached the Noord, the river separating the Alblasserwaard from IJsselmonde, in the evening. There they discovered that the sector near the only bridge, built in 1939, was not strongly occupied by the airborne troops, as the Germans simply had not known of its existence because of outdated maps. It was decided to postpone a crossing until the next day, to gather sufficient forces. No attempt was made to establish a bridgehead.

Meanwhile, on the evening of the 10th, around 22:00, French reconnaissance elements using Panhard 178 armoured cars had started to arrive at the Dutch border, forming a vanguard for the French 1st Mechanised Light Division. This division operated, with the 25e DIM on its left, on the northern flank of the French 7th Army; its mission was to ensure contact between the Vesting Holland and Antwerp. Attempts to co-ordinate the French advance with Colonel Leonard Johannes Schmidt, the military commander of the Dutch troops in North Brabant, were largely unsuccessful as, apart from the fact that he could not be reached that day, Dutch defences there were already collapsing. At Mill, 256. Infanteriedivision at first could not exploit the opportunity offered by having a battalion in the back of the defenders because it failed to locate it. When a first attack by forward elements had been repulsed, a full assault at the Main Defense Line was initially postponed to the next day because most artillery had not yet passed the single pontoon bridge over the Meuse, which had caused a traffic jam after having been damaged by an incident. In the early evening in a sudden change of plans it was decided to attack even though artillery support was absent apart from one 105 mm battery. An unrequested Stuka attack that also happened to hit the Mill sector just prior to the advance routed some Dutch defenders, creating a weak section in the line from which the Dutch troops were dislodged. Though the Germans were slow to exploit the breakthrough, Colonel Schmidt at 20:30 ordered the Peel-Raam Position to be abandoned and his troops to fall back to the west improvising a new line at the Zuid-Willemsvaart canal.

In the North, by the end of the day, 1. Kavalleriedivision had reached the line Meppel–Groningen, delayed by logistical problems and Dutch demolition teams blowing up 236 bridges. Dutch troop strength in that area was weak.

In the extreme south, the six border battalions in the province of Limburg only slightly delayed the advance of the German Sixth Army; before noon the area had been overrun and the strategic city of Maastricht had surrendered, opening the way for the German feint offensive into Central Belgium. The Germans however, failed to capture the main bridge intact, forcing them to delay the crossing by the 4th Panzer Division until the next day.

=== 11 May ===
On 11 May the Dutch commander General Winkelman was faced with two priorities. First of all he wanted to eliminate the German airborne troops. Though the strategic assault had failed, he feared a further enemy build-up via Waalhaven and saw the German possession of the Moerdijk bridges as a serious impediment to the movement of allied reinforcements to the Fortress Holland. The second priority was closely related to the first: enabling the French army to build up a strong defensive line in North Brabant, to connect the Fortress Holland with the Allied main force in Belgium. As he had withdrawn most of his troops from the area, Winkelman had only limited means available to influence this process, largely leaving the task to local commanders.

In both respects, little was achieved this day. The planned counterattack by the Light Division against the airborne troops on IJsselmonde failed. In the nick of time the bridge over the river Noord had been prepared for defence by the German paratroopers, and it proved impossible to force it. Several attempts to cross the river by boat managed only to establish a few isolated bridgeheads, and at 10:15 the Light Division was given permission to break off the crossing at this point and ordered to shift its axis of attack by reinforcing Dutch troops on the Island of Dordrecht, where it arrived that night. After clearing the Island of Dordrecht of enemy troops the division was to advance into IJsselmonde over the Dordrecht bridge in order to reach Rotterdam.

Earlier during the day, two attempts were made by Dutch battalions to carry out an attack against the western flank of the German perimeter. The first battalion, withdrawn from the Belgian border, partly crossed the Oude Maas at two points (Oud-Beijerland and Puttershoek) and tried to storm the bridge at Barendrecht into IJsselmonde; the second battalion, taken from the Fortress Holland forces positioned at the Hoekse Waard, had crossed the Dordtse Kil to the Island of Dordrecht the previous day, using the ferry at Wieldrecht, and now tried to expand its bridgehead. Although its crossings were successful, the advance of the first battalion was executed only hesitantly; the troops were surprised by German counterattacks and dispersed. The second battalion was likewise surprised, with many men being taken prisoner. In the afternoon a French reconnaissance unit, the 5e Groupe de Reconnaissance de Division d'Infanterie, with the assistance of another Dutch border battalion attempted an attack on the southern Moerdijk bridgehead, but the armoured cars of 6e Cuirassiers with which it was reinforced were heavily bombed by German Stukas and had to retreat.

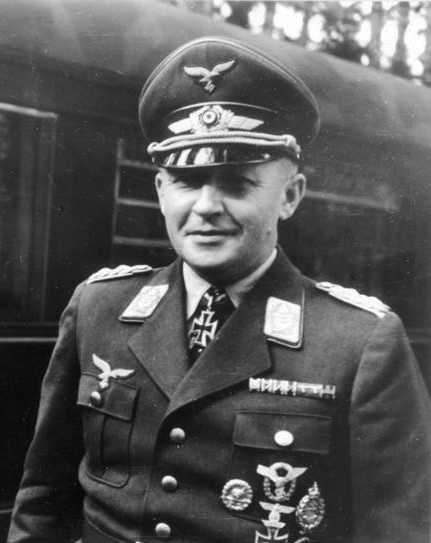
General der Fallschirmjäger Kurt Student

In Rotterdam, though reinforced by an infantry regiment, the Dutch failed to completely dislodge the German airborne troops from their bridgehead on the northern bank of the Maas. Despite permission from General Kurt Student, the German commander in Rotterdam refused to evacuate this bridgehead and the few German defenders held fast in a single office building, protected by a canal in front of them and covered by fire from the south bank. The two remaining Dutch bombers failed to destroy the Willemsbrug. The German forces involved in the attack of the previous day on The Hague also held out, none of the attempts to eliminate the isolated groups of in total about 1600 paratroopers and airlanded forces met with success.

In North Brabant, the situation swiftly deteriorated. The French commanders of the 7th Army had expected that Dutch resistance at the Meuse and the Peel-Raam Position, by a force about five divisions strong, would have gained them at least four days to build up a defensive line near Breda. They were unpleasantly surprised to learn that the best three divisions had been moved to the north and that the remaining forces were already in full retreat. The withdrawal of the Peel Division from the Peel-Raam Position to the Zuid-Willemsvaart, a canal some 10 to 30 km (6.2 to 18.6 mi) to the west, meant leaving behind their well-entrenched positions and the little artillery available in exchange for a totally unprepared line. Moreover, the eastern bank of the canal was higher than the western bank, providing excellent cover for the attackers. Finally, the order to withdraw never reached the troops at Mill; this caused one sector of the canal, near Heeswijk, to be left undefended; as this sector contained a bridge which was not demolished, the Germans were effortlessly able to cross the canal around 13:00. A second crossing at Erp, against opposition, led to a general collapse of the line. By the end of the 11th, the Germans had crossed the Zuid-Willemsvaart at most places and the Peel Division had largely disintegrated. Plans by Colonel Schmidt to concentrate his forces on the line Tilburg–'s-Hertogenbosch thus came to nothing. As the French refused to advance further to the northeast than Tilburg, apart from some reconnoitring armoured cars that went as far as Berlicum, this created a dangerous gap. Winkelman, sensitive to the general Dutch weakness in the region, requested the British government to send an Army Corps to reinforce allied positions in the area and bomb Waalhaven airfield.

All the efforts in the south were made on the assumption the Grebbe Line would be able to beat off attacks on its own; its reserves had even been partly shifted to the counterattack against the airborne forces. However, there were some indications that a problem was developing in this sector. Motorised elements of SS Standarte "Der Fuehrer", preceding 207. Infanteriedivision, had reached the southernmost part of the Grebbe Line, in front of the Grebbeberg, on the evening of the 10th. This Main Defense Line sector had no inundations in front of it and had therefore been chosen as the main attack axis of the division. It was protected by a line of outposts (voorpostenlinie), manned by two companies of infantry. At about half past three in the morning of the 11th, German artillery started shelling the outposts, followed at dawn by an attack by two battalions of Der Fuehrer. As the German shelling had cut the telephone lines, no artillery support could be requested by the Dutch defenders. Defence was further hampered by the fact that the terrain had not yet been cleared of vegetation, which offered good cover for the attackers. At noon a breakthrough was accomplished at the extreme north of the outpost line and the Dutch positions were then slowly rolled up from behind. The outnumbered and inferiorly armed companies resisted as well as they could, but by evening, all outposts were in German hands. The commander of 2nd Army Corps, Major-General Jacob Harberts, failed to react adequately. He did not realise that motorised SS troops had been involved in the attack, and thought that the outposts had been surrendered to a small probing German force through the cowardice of the defenders. He ordered a night counterattack by the single reserve battalion of 4th Division. This attack was abandoned; on its approach the battalion was fired upon by Dutch troops manning the main line who had not been notified of its approach, leading to much confusion, and an engineer bridge necessary to cross the Grift rivulet was not brought forward in time. However, heavy preparatory Dutch artillery fire had the unintended effect of causing the Germans to abandon their plans for a night attack.

Meanwhile, in the North, 1. Kavalleriedivision advanced through the province of Friesland towards the final Dutch fall-back line, the Wonsstelling, reaching Sneek in the evening. Most Dutch troops had been evacuated from the north over the Afsluitdijk.

=== 12 May ===
On the morning of 12 May General Winkelman remained moderately optimistic. He still assumed a firm defence line could eventually be established in North Brabant with the help of the French and expected good progress could be made in eliminating the airborne forces, while not being aware of any special danger to the Grebbe Line. During the day his hopes would be dashed.

In the two previous days, 9. Panzerdivision had seen little action. It crossed the Meuse early on the morning of 11 May, but that day was unable to advance quickly over roads congested with the supply trains of the infantry divisions. The armoured division was under orders to link up with the airborne troops as soon as the Peel-Raam Position had been breached by the infantry forces. As the entire Dutch front had dissolved, the conditions were favourable for such an attempt. In this it would not be hindered by the French forces. Because the German 6th Army was threatening its right flank and there was no time to prepare a defence line, Gamelin ordered the 7th Army to withdraw its left flank. 2e Brigade Légère Mécanique, part of 1e Division Légère Mécanique, which had arrived at Tilburg, retreated to the south. Also, the 25e Division d'Infanterie Motorisée at Breda progressed no further to the north than the river Mark. As the initial order to occupy the Geertruidenberg sector had not been followed upon, the route to the Moerdijk bridges would not be blocked and the German armoured division would not be engaged by its stronger French mechanised counterpart. Reconnaissance elements of the 9th Panzer Division effectively exploited this opportunity: at dawn, north of Tilburg, near Loon op Zand, they surprised Colonel Schmidt and took him prisoner. Dutch troops in the province thereby lost all unified command. Shortly after noon German armoured cars had penetrated thirty kilometres further to the west and made contact with the southern Moerdijk bridgehead, cutting off Fortress Holland from the Allied main force; at 16:45 they reached the bridges themselves. The northern part of that force would not long remain in the region: at 13:35 Gamelin ordered a complete withdrawal to Antwerp of all French troops in North Brabant, who would now limit themselves to rear-guard actions.

The Light Division tried to systematically reconquer the Island of Dordrecht by advancing on a broad front, using four battalions with little artillery support. On its left flank, where there was almost no enemy presence, the advance went according to plan. The battalion on the right flank however, ran into an attacking German force of battalion strength that had been ordered by General Student to circle around the outskirts of the city to relieve the pressure being placed on his troops holding the Dort bridges. In confused street fighting the German troops were successful in blocking the battalion; the other Dutch units then halted their advance around noon. Though higher command soon ordered a better concentration of forces instead of some mopping-up action, due to a lack of clear lines of command, no subsequent attack materialised that day.

In Rotterdam and around The Hague again little was done against the paratroopers. Most Dutch commanders, still afraid of a presumed Fifth Column, limited themselves to security measures; they had been ordered not to stage any attacks above company level.

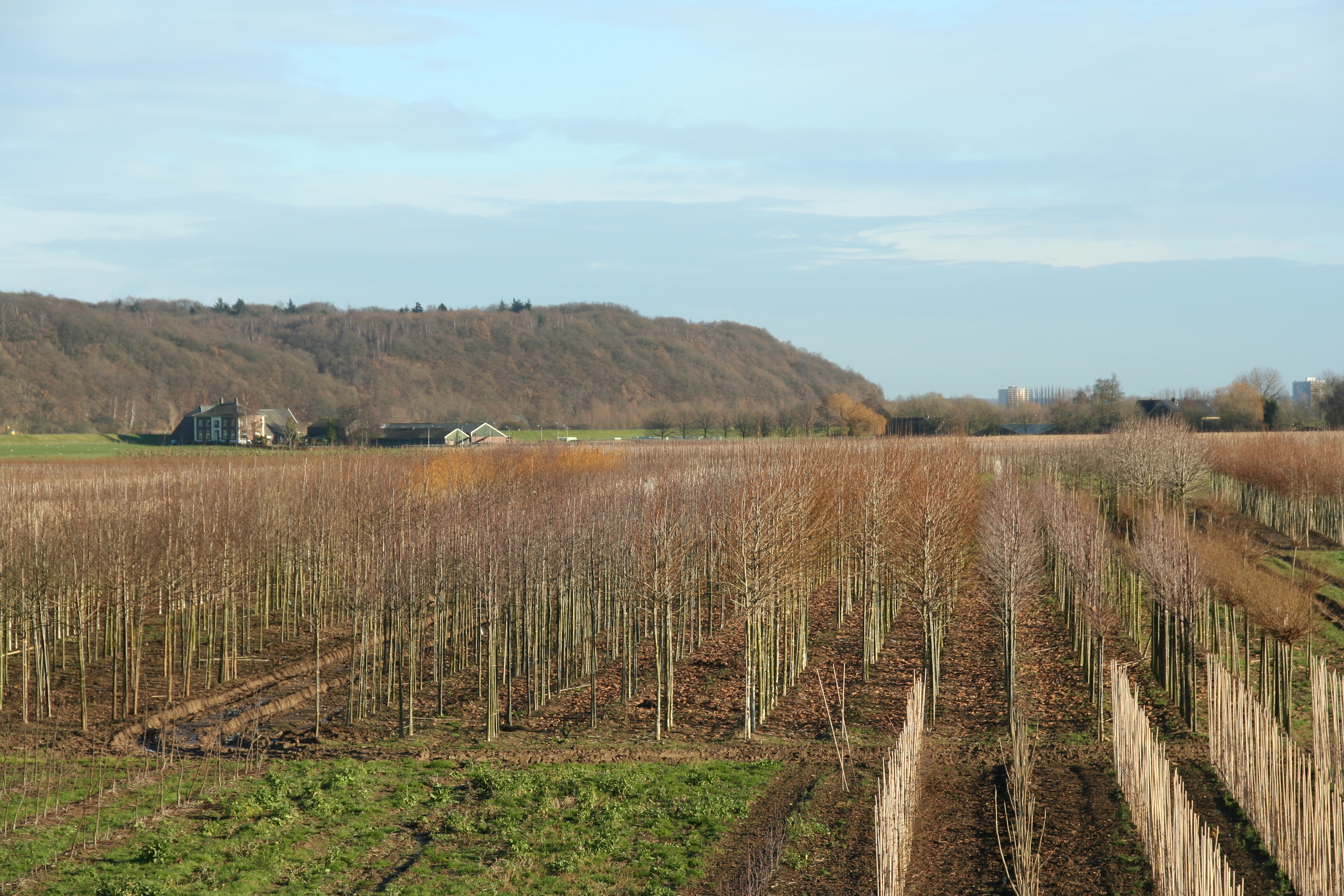
The Grebbeberg seen from the south; the slopes facing the attackers in the east were more gradual (2005).

While the situation in the south was becoming critical, in the east the Germans made a first successful effort in dislodging the Dutch defenders on the Grebbeberg. After preparatory artillery bombardment in the morning, at around noon a battalion of Der Fuehrer attacked an eight hundred metres wide sector of the main line, occupied by a Dutch company. Exploiting the many dead angles in the Dutch field of fire, it soon breached the Dutch positions, which had little depth. A second German battalion then expanded the breach to the north. Dutch artillery, though equal in strength to the German, failed to bring sufficient fire on the enemy concentration of infantry, largely limiting itself to interdiction. Eight hundred metres to the west was a Stop Line, a continuous trench system from which the defenders were supposed to wage an active defence, staging local counterattacks. However, due to a lack of numbers, training, and heavy weapons the attacks failed against the well-trained SS troops. By the evening the Germans had brought the heavily forested area between the two lines under their control. Spotting a weak point, one of the SS battalion commanders, Obersturmbannführer Hilmar Wäckerle, suddenly attacked with a hastily assembled force of about company strength. In a, for this battle, rare instance of infiltration tactics he broke through the Stop Line, quickly advancing 1.6 km (1 mi) to the west until being halted by a fall-back line along the Rhenen railroad. The breakthrough caused a panic among the defenders, who largely abandoned the Stop Line at this point; but as Wäckerle had had no time to co-ordinate his action with other units, it was not further exploited. Order was restored at the Stop Line and the SS company became isolated and surrounded. The earlier general German advance later caused the main line to be abandoned for over 3.2 km (2 mi) to the north because the troops there feared an attack from behind.

It had been well understood by the Dutch that the forces occupying the Grebbe Line would not be sufficiently strong to repel all attacks by themselves; they were intended to delay an offensive long enough for reserves to reinforce them. Due to the failure the previous day to understand that the German main assault was imminent, these reserves would not arrive in time to intervene in the fight at the defence zone between the two trench systems. This was all the more serious as the Stop Line had no depth and lacked large shelters to accommodate enough troops to stage a strong frontal counterattack. In the late evening it was decided to execute a flank attack from the north the next day.

In the North, the Wons Position formed a bridgehead at the eastern end of the Enclosure Dike; it had a long perimeter of about nine kilometres to envelop enough land to receive a large number of retreating troops without making them too vulnerable to air attack. On 12 May units with a combined strength of only two battalions were still present, so the line was weakly held. This was exploited by the first German unit to arrive, the single bicycle battalion of 1. Kavalleriedivision. At noon it quickly penetrated the line in a concentrated attack, forcing the defenders to withdraw to the Enclosure Dike. For some the German advance cut off their escape route by land; they sailed away from the small port of Makkum, taking the last remaining vessels on the eastern side of Lake IJssel. This denied the Germans any craft for a crossing attempt, which plan was now abandoned.

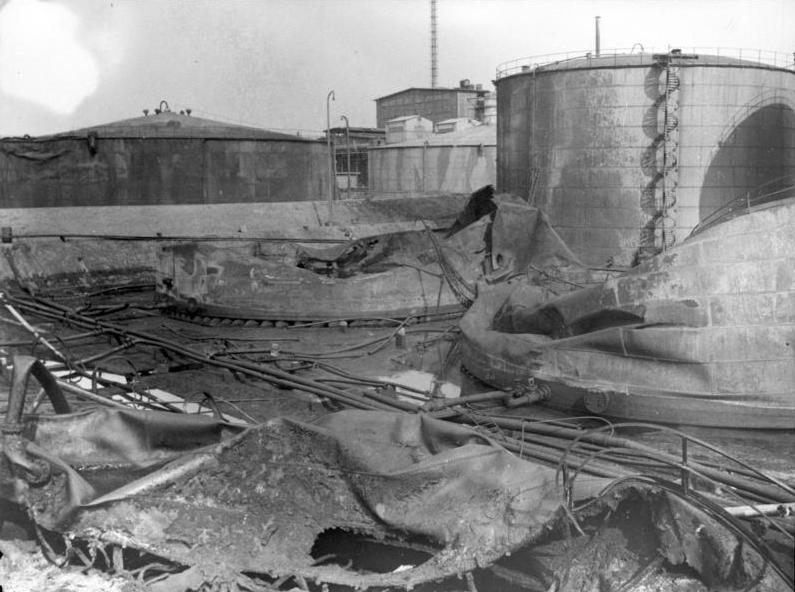
Burnt-out Shell Oil reservoirs

In the afternoon General Winkelman received information about armoured forces advancing in the Langstraat region, on the road between 's-Hertogenbosch and the Moerdijk bridges. He still fostered hopes that those forces were French, but the announcement by Radio Bremen at 23:00 that German tanks had linked up with the paratroopers ended those hopes. At last he began to understand the essence of the German strategy. He ordered the artillery batteries in the Hoekse Waard to try to destroy the Moerdijk bridges and sent a special engineering team to Rotterdam to blow up the Willemsbrug. Pessimistic about the general situation at this point, he also ordered the vast strategic oil reserves of Royal Dutch Shell at Pernis to be set on fire. Having been informed by Winkelman of his concerns earlier in the afternoon, the Dutch government asked Churchill for three British divisions to turn the tide. The new prime minister answered that he simply did not have any reserves; however, three British torpedo boats were sent to Lake IJssel. Also, 2nd Battalion, The Welsh Guards was prepared to be sent to the Hook of Holland though it would not arrive in time.

Contrary to Winkelman, the German command was very satisfied with the day's events. It had been feared that the third day of the operation might become a "crisis day", the XXVI Armeekorps having to overcome near Breda the resistance of several French divisions. The Germans had also been concerned that they may face some Belgian or even British divisions. Therefore, von Bock had before the invasion requested to be reinforced in this effort by another Army Corps. When this had been denied by chief of staff Franz Halder, he had arranged the formation of an extra Army Corps headquarters to direct the complex strategic situation of simultaneously fighting the Allies and advancing into the Fortress Holland over the Moerdijk bridges. As on 12 May no actual crisis seemed to materialise, with the French retreating and Belgian and British forces being completely absent, von Bock decided that XXVI Armeekorps would be responsible for pursuing the French south towards Antwerp, while some forces would be directed by the new headquarters, Generalkommando XXXIX under command of Generalleutnant Rudolf Schmidt, to advance north with 254. Infanteriedivision, most of 9. Panzerdivision, and SS Leibstandarte Adolf Hitler.

=== 13 May ===
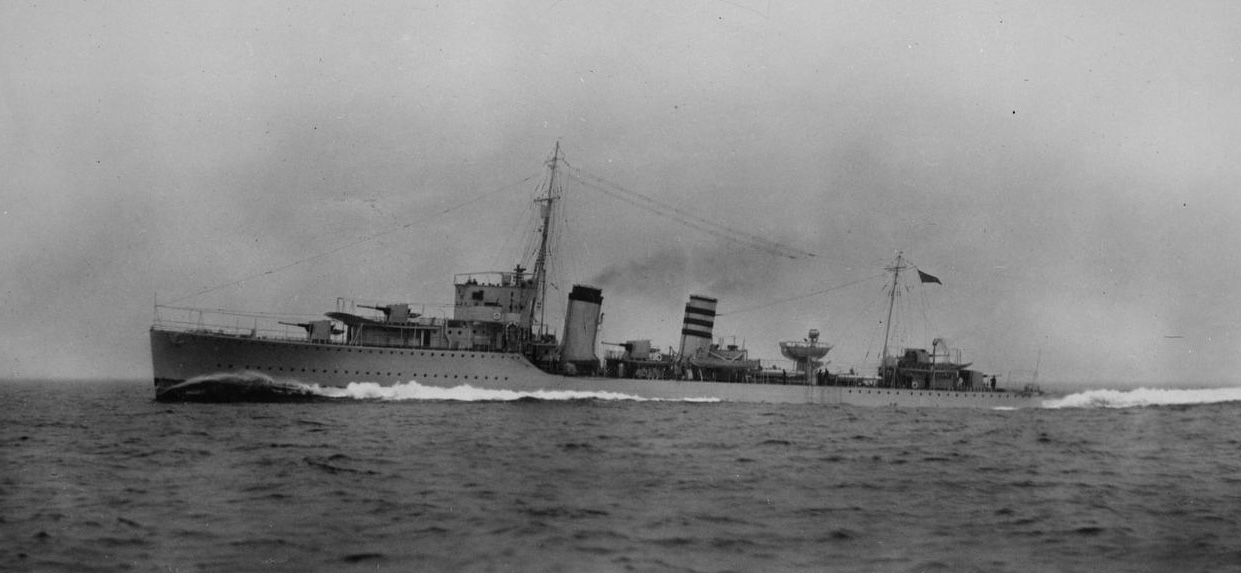
HMS Codrington, which evacuated members of the Dutch Royal family from the Netherlands

In the early morning of 13 May General Winkelman advised the Dutch government that he considered the general situation to be critical. On land the Dutch had been cut off from the Allied front and it had become clear no major Allied landings were to be expected to reinforce the Fortress Holland by sea; without such support there was no prospect of a prolonged successful resistance. German tanks might quickly pass through Rotterdam; Winkelman had already ordered all available antitank-guns to be placed in a perimeter around The Hague, to protect the seat of government. However, an immediate collapse of the Dutch defences might still be prevented if the planned counterattacks could seal off the southern front near Dordrecht and restore the eastern line at the Grebbeberg. Therefore, the cabinet decided to continue the fight for the time being, giving the general the mandate to surrender the Army when he saw fit and the instruction to avoid unnecessary sacrifices. Nevertheless, it was also deemed essential that Queen Wilhelmina be brought to safety; she departed around noon from Hook of Holland, where a British Irish Guards battalion was present, on HMS Hereward, a British destroyer, and when sea mines made it too dangerous to try to reach Zealand, she went to England.

The previous evening, the Queen's only child and heir presumptive Princess Juliana, together with her husband Prince Bernhard of Lippe-Biesterfeld and their children, had departed from IJmuiden on HMS Codrington for Harwich. Arrangements for the departure had already been made before the invasion. As the Queen constitutionally was part of the government, her departure confronted the cabinet with the choice whether to follow her or remain. After heated discussions, it was decided to leave as well; the ministers sailed at 19:20 from Hook of Holland on HMS Windsor to form a government in exile in London, having conferred all governmental authority over the homeland to Winkelman. Three Dutch merchant ships, escorted by British warships, transferred government bullion and diamond stocks to the United Kingdom.

While two tank companies of 9. Panzerdivision remained with XXVI Armeekorps to pursue the withdrawing French, the other four began to cross the Moerdijk traffic bridge at 05:20. Two staff companies with tanks also went to the northern side. The Dutch made some attempts to indirectly block the advance of the German armour. At around 06:00 the last operational medium bomber, a Fokker T. V, dropped two bombs on the bridge; one hit a bridge pillar but failed to explode; the bomber was shot down. Dutch batteries in the Hoekse Waard, despite dive bomber attacks, tried to destroy the bridge by artillery fire, but the massive structure was only slightly damaged. Attempts to inundate the Island of Dordrecht failed, as the inlet sluices could not be opened—and were too small anyway.

The Light Division tried to cut the German corridor by advancing to the west and linking up with a small ferry bridgehead over the Dortse Kil. However, two of the four battalions available were inefficiently deployed in a failed effort to recapture the suburbs of Dordrecht; when the other two battalions approached the main road, they were met head on by a few dozen German tanks. The vanguard of the Dutch troops, not having been informed of their presence, mistook the red air recognition cloths strapped on top of the German armour for orange flags French vehicles might use to indicate their friendly intentions—orange being seen by the Dutch as their national colour—and ran towards the vehicles to welcome them, only understanding their error when they were gunned down. The battalions, subsequently hit by a Stuka bombardment, fled to the east; a catastrophe was prevented by 47mm and 75 mm batteries halting with direct AP fire the assault of the German tanks. The left wing of the Light Division despite the heavy losses then completed an ordered withdrawal to the Alblasserwaard at around 13:00. In the early afternoon eight tanks reduced the ferry bridgehead. A tank company also tried to capture the old inner city of Dordrecht without infantry support, audaciously breaching barricades, but was ordered to retreat after heavy street fighting in which at least two Panzer II light tanks were destroyed and three tanks heavily damaged. All Dutch troops were withdrawn from the island in the night.

German armoured forces advanced north over the Dordrecht bridge to IJsselmonde island. Three tanks, two Panzer IIs and a Panzer III medium tank of the staff platoon of the 1st Tank Battalion, stormed the Barendrecht bridge into the Hoekse Waard, but all of them were lost to a single 47 mm antitank-gun. Though the Germans did not follow up their attack, this area too was abandoned by the Dutch troops.

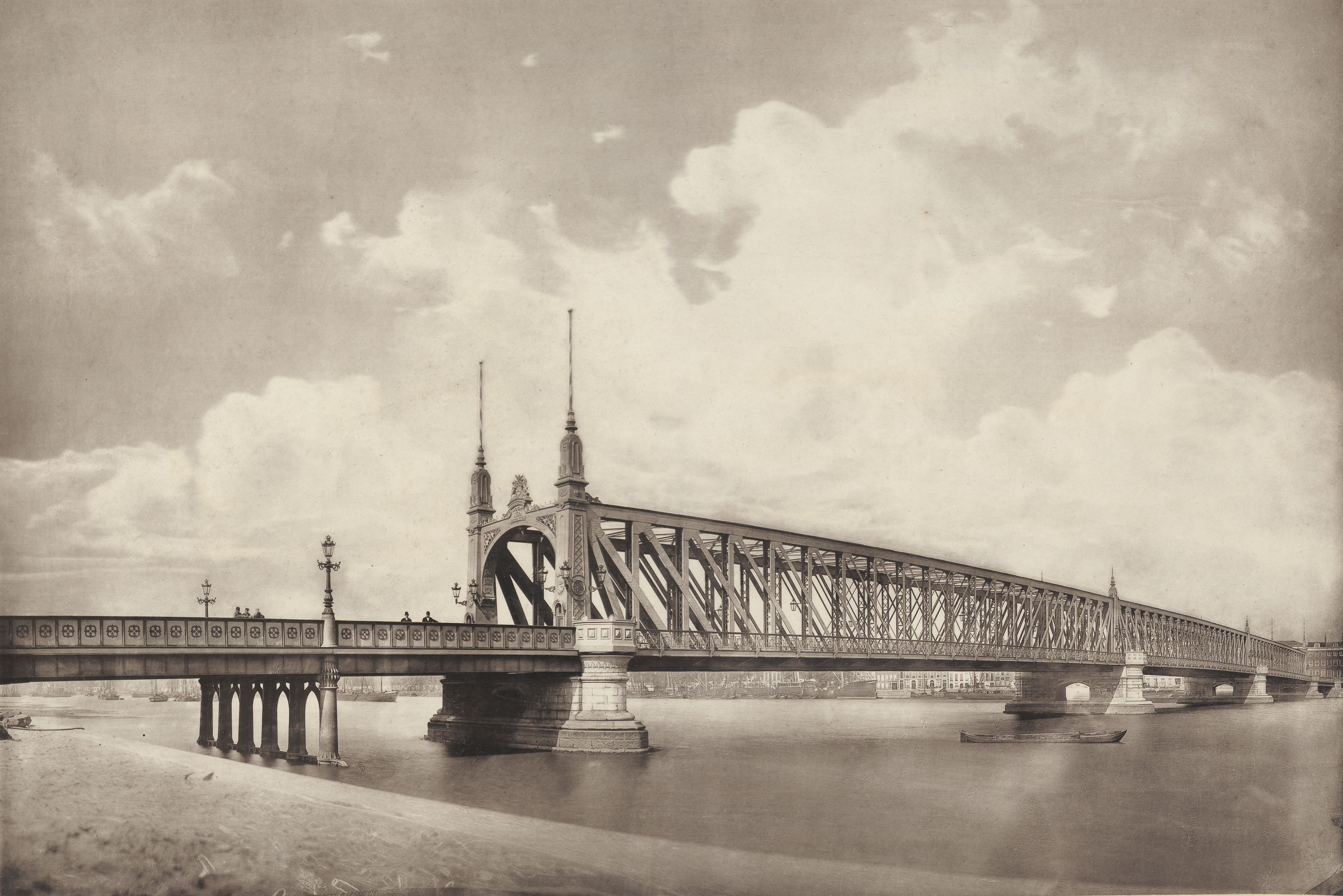
The Willemsbrug shortly after its opening in 1878, as seen from Noordereiland. A new bridge was completed nearby in 1981, and this one was demolished.

In Rotterdam a last attempt was made to blow up the Willemsbrug. The commander of the 2nd Battalion Irish Guards in Hook of Holland, 32 km (20 mi) to the west, refused to participate in the attempt as being outside the scope of his orders. Two Dutch companies, mainly composed of Dutch marines, stormed the bridgehead. The bridge was reached and the remaining fifty German defenders in the building in front of it were on the point of surrender when after hours of fighting the attack was abandoned because of heavy flanking fire from the other side of the river.

In the North, the commander of 1. Kavalleriedivision, Major General Kurt Feldt, faced the unenviable task of having to advance over the Enclosure Dike because of a lack of ships. This dam was blocked by the Kornwerderzand Position, which protected a major sluice complex regulating the water level of Lake IJssel, which had to be sufficiently high to allow many Fortress Holland inundations to be maintained. The main fortifications contained 47 mm anti-tank guns. Long channel piers projected in front of and behind the sluices, on both the right and left; on these, pillboxes had been built which could place a heavy enfilading fire on the dam, which did not provide the slightest cover for any attacker. On 13 May the position was reinforced by a 20 mm anti-aircraft battery. It had been Feldt's intention to first destroy the position by a battery of siege mortars, but the train transporting it had been blocked on 10 May by a blown railway bridge at Winschoten. Several air attacks on 13 May had little effect; in the late afternoon five bicycle sections tried to approach the main bunker complex under cover of an artillery bombardment, but soon fled after being fired upon; the first was pinned down and could only retreat under cover of darkness, leaving behind some dead.

In the East the Germans tried to overcome the resistance in the Grebbe Line by also deploying the other division of X Armeekorps, the 227. Infanteriedivision. It was ordered to break through a second attack axis near Scherpenzeel, where a dry approach route had been discovered through the inundations. The line in this area was defended by the Dutch 2nd Infantry Division. Two German regiments were to attack simultaneously, in adjacent sectors. However, after the regiment on the right, 366. Infanterieregiment, reached the start position for the attack, the regiment on the left, 412. Infanterieregiment, became delayed by flanking fire from the Dutch outpost line, the position of which had not been correctly determined. It allowed itself to get involved in fragmented firefights, and although the reserve regiment was also eventually brought forward, little progress was made against the outposts. Meanwhile, the waiting 366. Infanterieregiment was pounded by concentrated Dutch artillery fire and had to withdraw, resulting in a complete failure of the attack by 227. Infanteriedivision.

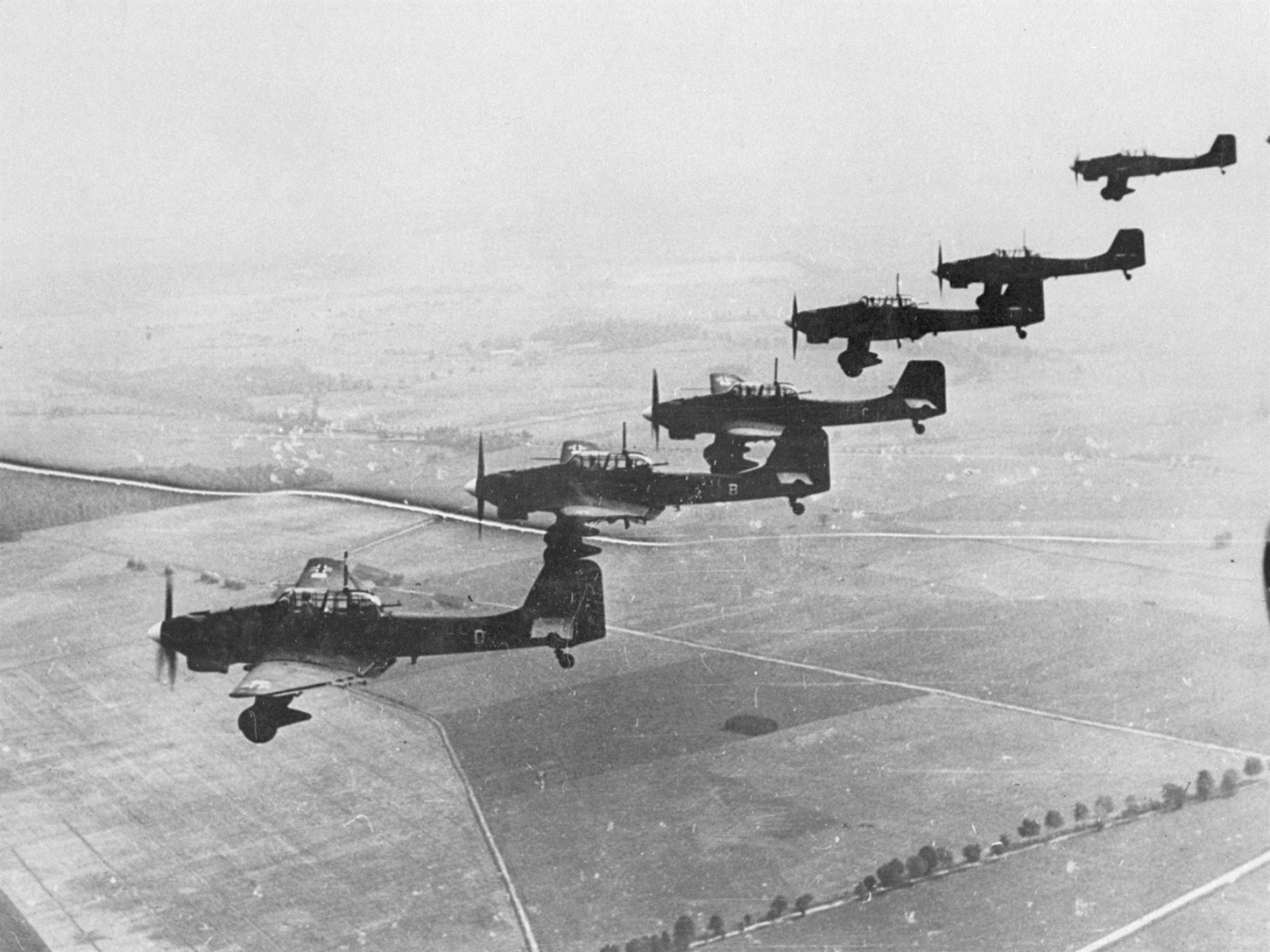
Junkers Ju 87 Bs

On the extreme south of the Grebbe Line, the Grebbeberg, the Germans were now deploying three SS battalions including support troops and three fresh infantry battalions of IR.322; two of IR.374 laid in immediate reserve. During the evening and night of 12–13 May the Dutch had assembled in this sector about a dozen battalions. These forces consisted of the reserve battalions of several army corps, divisions and brigades, and the independent Brigade B, which had been freed when the Main Defence Line in the Land van Maas en Waal had been abandoned as part of the withdrawal of III Army Corps from North Brabant. However, not all of these units would be concentrated into a single effort for a counterattack to retake the main line. Some battalions had been fed immediately into the battle at the Stop Line and others were kept in reserve, mainly behind the fall-back line near the Rhenen railroad. Furthermore, most battalions were a quarter below strength. Four were to be used, under command of Brigade B, for the flanking attack from the north. This attack was delayed for several hours; when it finally started late in the morning of 13 May, it ran right into a comparable advance by two battalions of Der Fuehrer. This brigade, unaware of Dutch intentions, had shifted its attack axis to the north to roll up the Grebbe Line from behind. A confused encounter battle followed in which the vanguard of the Dutch troops, poorly supported by their artillery, began to give way at around 12:30 to the encroaching SS troops. Soon this resulted in a general withdrawal of the brigade, which turned into a rout when, at about 13:30, the Grebbeberg area was bombed by 27 Ju 87 Stukas.

Meanwhile, 207. Infanteriedivision was for the first time committed to battle at the Grebbeberg itself when two battalions of its 322. Infanterieregiment attacked the Stop Line. The first wave of German attackers was beaten back with serious losses, but a second wave managed to fragment the trench line, which then was taken after heavy fighting. The regiment subsequently proceeded to mop up the area to the west, delayed by resistance from several Dutch command posts. It withdrew in the late afternoon, just as the SS battalions further north, to avoid a preparatory artillery bombardment, shifted to a more western position. After redeployment the Germans intended to renew their attack in order to take the Rhenen fall-back line and the village of Achterberg. However, these preparations would prove to be superfluous: the Dutch had already disappeared.

The same Stuka bombardment that had put Brigade B to rout also broke the morale of the reserves at Rhenen. In the morning these troops had already shown severe discipline problems, with units disintegrating and leaving the battlefield because of German interdiction fire. In the late afternoon most of 4th Infantry Division was fleeing westwards. The Germans had expected that the Dutch would attempt to plug any gaps in the line and indeed it had been planned to shift to the north two regiments of the Dutch 3rd Army Corps for this purpose. But Dutch command now suffered such a loss of control that any thoughts to re-establish a continuous front had to be abandoned. A 8 km (5.0 mi) wide gap had appeared in the defences. Fearing that otherwise they would be encircled, at 20:30 Van Voorst tot Voorst ordered the three Army Corps to immediately abandon both the Grebbe Line and the Waal-Linge Position and to retreat during the night to the East Front of Fortress Holland at the New Holland Water Line. The Germans, however, did not at once exploit their success; only around 21:00 had it become apparent to them that the gap even existed, when the renewed advance had met no enemy resistance.

=== 14 May ===
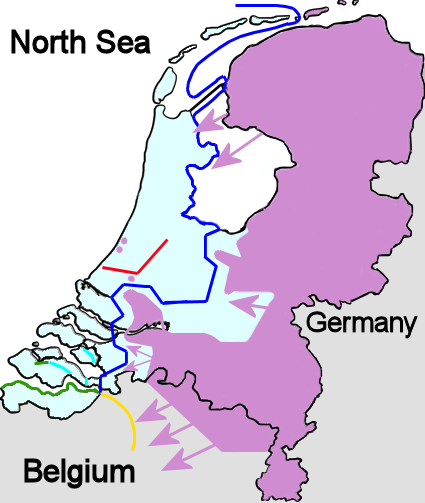
Dutch situation just before the Rotterdam Blitz Legend: Location of the Dutch defence lines and area within Dutch troops are present Heavy Dutch defence line against armoured vehicles Dutch defences in Zeeland Belgian defence line French defences in the Netherlands Position of German troops as well as areas under German control

Despite his pessimism expressed to the Dutch government and the mandate he had been given to surrender the Army, General Winkelman awaited the outcome of events, avoiding actually capitulating until it was absolutely necessary. In this he was perhaps motivated by a desire to engage the opposing German troops for as long as possible, to assist the Allied war effort. In the early morning of 14 May, though the situation remained critical, a certain calm was evident in the Dutch Headquarters.

In the North, a German artillery bombardment of the Kornwerderzand Position began at 09:00. However, the German batteries were forced to move away after being surprised by counterfire from the 15 cm. aft cannon of HNLMS Johan Maurits van Nassau, which had sailed into the Wadden Sea. Feldt now decided to land on the coast of North-Holland. A few barges were found; only after the capitulation however, was the crossing actually executed. During this operation one barge foundered and the remainder lost their way. Fears for such a landing had caused Winkelman on 12 May to order the occupation of an improvised "Amsterdam Position" along the North Sea Canal, but only weak forces were available.

In the East, under cover of ground fog the field army successfully withdrew from the Grebbe Line to the East Front without being bombed as had been feared, and disengaged from the gradually pursuing enemy troops. The new position had some severe drawbacks: the inundations were mostly not yet ready and the earthworks and berms needed because trenches would be flooded in the peat soil had not yet been constructed, so defences had to be improvised to accommodate the much larger number of troops.

On IJsselmonde the German forces prepared to cross the Maas in Rotterdam, which was defended by about eight Dutch battalions. Crossings would be attempted in two sectors. The main attack would take place in the centre of the city, with the German 9th Panzer Division advancing over the Willemsbrug. Then SS Leibstandarte Adolf Hitler would cross to operate on its immediate left and east of Rotterdam a battalion of the 16th Infantry Regiment of 22. Luftlandedivision would cross on boats. These auxiliary attacks might prevent a concentration of Dutch forces, blocking the 9th Panzer Division's advance through a densely built up urban area intersected by canals. In view of these conditions and the limited means available, there was a major emphasis on air support. Already on 13 May, von Küchler, fearing that the British might reinforce the Fortress Holland, had instructed Schmidt: "Resistance in Rotterdam should be broken with all means, if necessary threaten with and carry out the annihilation [Vernichtung] of the city". In this he was to be supported by the highest command level as Hitler would state in Führer-Weisung Nr. 11 (Führer-Directive N°11): "On the northern wing the power of the Army of Holland to resist has proven stronger than had been assumed. Political as well as military grounds demand to quickly break this resistance. (...) Furthermore the speedy conquest of the Fortress Holland is to be facilitated through a deliberate weakening of the [air] power operated by Sixth Army". Kampfgeschwader 54, using Heinkel He 111 bombers, was therefore shifted from Sixth to Eighteenth Army.

Generals Kurt Student and Schmidt desired a limited air attack to temporarily paralyse the defences, allowing the tanks to break out of the bridgehead; severe urban destruction was to be avoided as it would only hamper their advance. However, Luftwaffe commander Hermann Göring, worried about the fate of his surrounded airborne troops, hoped to force an immediate Dutch national capitulation by a much more extensive bombardment. His head of operations, General Otto Hoffmann von Waldau, described this option as a "radical solution" (Radikallösung). Despite misgivings by Albert Kesselring about its scope and necessity, at 11:45 ninety Heinkels took off for a carpet bombing of the inner city of Rotterdam.

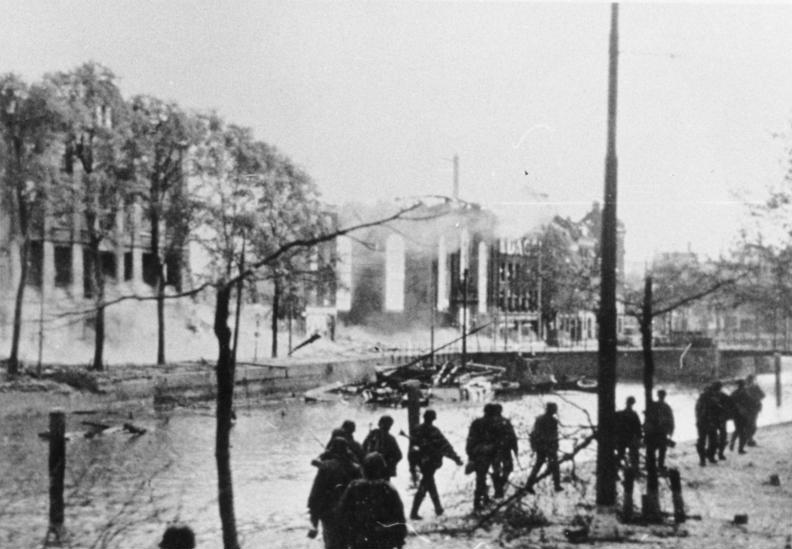
German troops advance through a destroyed section of Rotterdam.

At 09:00 a German messenger crossed the Willemsbrug to bring an ultimatum from Schmidt to Colonel Pieter Scharroo, the Dutch commander of Rotterdam, demanding a capitulation of the city; if a positive answer had not been received within two hours the "severest means of annihilation" would be employed. However, Scharroo did not receive the message until 10:30. Not feeling inclined to surrender regardless, he asked Winkelman for orders; the latter, hearing that the document had not been signed nor contained the name of the sender, instructed him to send a Dutch envoy to clarify matters and gain time. At 12:15 a Dutch captain handed this request to von Choltitz. On the return of the German envoy at 12:00, Schmidt had already sent a radio message that the bombardment had to be postponed because negotiations had started. Just after the Dutch envoy had received a second ultimatum, now signed by Schmidt and with a new expiry time of 16:20, around 13:20 two formations of Heinkels arrived, not having received any recall orders. This was later explained by the Germans as a result of their having already pulled in their tow aerials. Schmidt ordered red flares to be fired to signal that the bombardment was to be broken off, but only the squadron making the bomb run from the southwest abandoned its attack, after their first three planes had dropped their bombs. The other 54 Heinkels, having approached from the east, continued to drop their share of the grand total of 1308 bombs, destroying the inner city and killing 814 civilians. The ensuing fires destroyed about 24,000 houses, making almost 80,000 inhabitants homeless. At 15:50 Scharroo capitulated to Schmidt in person. Meanwhile, Göring had ordered a second bombardment of the city—a group of Heinkels had already left—to be carried out unless a message was received that the whole of Rotterdam was occupied. When Schmidt heard of the order, he hastily sent an uncoded message at 17:15 claiming the city was taken, although this had yet to take place. The bombers were recalled just in time.

== The surrender of the Dutch Army ==
The phases of the Dutch occupation

Winkelman at first intended to continue the fight, even though Rotterdam had capitulated and German forces from there might now advance into the heart of the Fortress Holland. The possibility of terror bombings was considered before the invasion and had not been seen as grounds for immediate capitulation; provisions had been made for the continuation of effective government even after widespread urban destruction. The perimeter around The Hague might still ward off an armoured attack and the New Holland Water Line had some defensive capability; though it could be attacked from behind, it would take the Germans some time to deploy their forces in the difficult polder landscape.

However, he soon received a message from Colonel Cuno Eduard Willem baron van Voorst tot Voorst, the commander of the city of Utrecht, that the Germans demanded its surrender; leaflets were dropped by propaganda planes announcing that only unconditional surrender could "spare it the fate of Warsaw". Winkelman concluded that it apparently had become the German policy to devastate any city offering any resistance; in view of his mandate to avoid unnecessary suffering and the hopelessness of the Dutch military position he decided to surrender. All higher-level army units were informed at 16:50 by Telex of his decision and ordered to first destroy their weapons and then offer their surrender to the nearest German units. At 17:20 the German envoy in The Hague was informed. At around 19:00 Winkelman gave a radio speech informing the Dutch people. This was also how the German command became aware the Dutch had surrendered; the Dutch troops had generally disengaged from the enemy and had not yet made contact. The Dutch surrender implied that in principle a cease-fire should be observed by both parties.

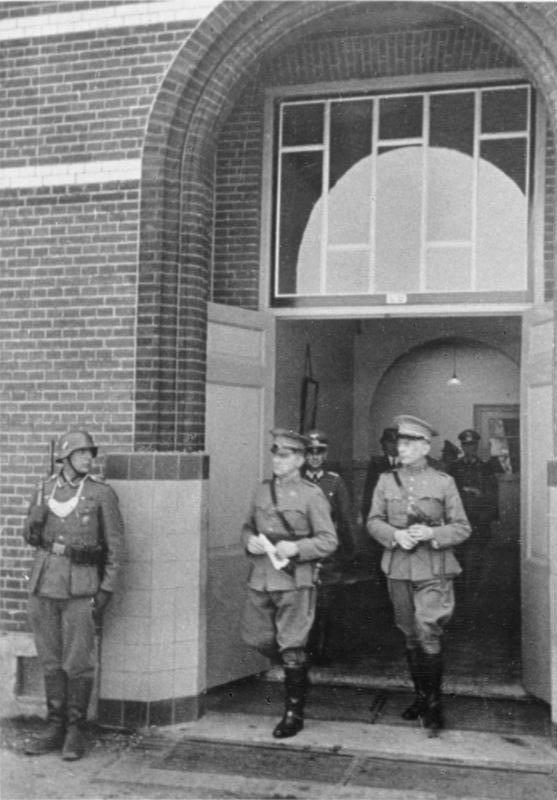
Winkelman, in the centre, leaves the school building in which the negotiations took place.

Winkelman acted both in his capacity of commander of the Dutch Army and of highest executive power of the homeland. This created a somewhat ambiguous situation. On the morning of 14 May the commander of the Royal Dutch Navy, Vice-Admiral Johannes Furstner, had left the country to continue the fight; Dutch naval vessels were generally not included in the surrender. Eight ships and four unfinished hulks had already departed, some smaller vessels were scuttled, and nine others sailed for England in the evening of 14 May. Johan Maurits van Nassau was sunk by German bombers while crossing. The commander of the main Dutch naval port of Den Helder, Rear-Admiral Hoyte Jolles, concluded that his base, with a naval garrison of 10,000, its own air service, and extensive land defences, should continue to resist also. Only with some difficulty did Winkelman convince him to obey the surrender order. Large parts of the Dutch Army were also reluctant to believe or accept the surrender, especially those units that hardly had seen any fighting, such as 3rd and 4th Army Corps and Brigade A.

At 05:00 on 15 May a German messenger reached The Hague, inviting Winkelman to Rijsoord for a meeting with von Küchler to negotiate the articles of a written capitulation document. Both quickly agreed on most conditions, Winkelman declaring to have surrendered army, naval and air forces. When von Küchler demanded that pilots still fighting for the allies should be treated as francs-tireurs—seen by the Germans as guerilla fighters outside the laws of war—Winkelman's refusal made it clear to the Germans that only the armed forces in the homeland, with the exception of Zealand, would capitulate, not the country itself. On other points a swift agreement was reached and the document was signed at 10:15.

== The fighting in Zealand ==
The province of Zealand, in the southwest of the country, was exempt from the surrender; fighting continued there in a common allied effort with French troops. The Dutch forces in the province comprised eight full battalions of army and naval troops. They were commanded by Rear-Admiral Hendrik Jan van der Stad, who, being a naval officer, had been directly subordinated to Winkelman. The area was under naval command because of the predominance of the naval port of Flushing on the island of Walcheren which controlled the access to Antwerp via the Western Scheldt. The northern islands of the province were defended only by a few platoons. The defence of Zeelandic Flanders, the Dutch part of Flanders, was largely left to the Allies. The main Dutch army forces would thus be concentrated in Zuid-Beveland, the peninsula east of Walcheren, to deny the enemy this approach route to Vlissingen. Zuid-Beveland was connected to the coast of North Brabant by an isthmus; at its eastern and most narrow end the Bath Position had been prepared, occupied by an infantry battalion. This was mainly intended as a collecting line for possible Dutch troops retreating from the east. At its western end was the longer Zanddijk Position, occupied by three battalions.

Three French GRDIs (Groupes de Reconnaissance de Division d'Infanterie) had arrived on 10 May; these motorised units subsequently departed for North Brabant, but from 11 May the area was reinforced by two French infantry divisions: the 60th Infantry Division (60e Division d'Infanterie), a B-class division, and the newly formed naval 68th Infantry Division (68e Division d'Infanterie). Part of their equipment was brought by ship through Flushing harbour. Most troops of these divisions would remain south of the Western Scheldt in Zeelandic Flanders, where two of the eight Dutch battalions were also present, as were two border companies. Only two French regiments were sent to the northern bank. On 13 May the Dutch troops were placed under French operational command and 68e Division d'Infanterie was transferred to the 7th Army. Cooperation between the two allies left much to be desired and was plagued by poor communications, misunderstandings and differences regarding strategy. The Dutch considered the Bath and Zanddijk Positions to be very defensible because of the open polder landscape and extensive inundations. However, the French commander, General Pierre-Servais Durand, was not convinced of their value and positioned his troops at more conspicuous obstacles. On the evening of 13 May one regiment, the 271e of 68e Division d'Infanterie, occupied the Canal through Zuid-Beveland and the other, the 224e of 60 Division d'Infanterie, took a position at the Sloe straights separating the island of Walcheren from Zuid-Beveland, even though there was not sufficient time for adequate entrenchment. This prevented an effective concentration of Allied forces, allowing the Germans, despite a numerical inferiority, to defeat them piecemeal.

On 14 May the Germans had occupied almost all of North Brabant. SS-Standarte Deutschland, quickly advancing to the Western Scheldt, reached the Bath Position. This cut off the retreat of 27e Groupe de Reconnaissance de Division d'Infanterie, which was subsequently destroyed defending Bergen-op-Zoom. The morale of the defenders of the Bath Position, already shaken by stories from Dutch troops fleeing to the west, was severely undermined by the news that Winkelman had surrendered; many concluded that it was useless for Zealand to continue resisting as the last remaining province. A first preparatory artillery bombardment on the position in the evening of 14 May caused the commanding officers to desert their troops, who then also fled.

On the morning of 15 May SS-Standarte Deutschland approached the Zanddijk Position. A first attack around 08:00 on outposts of the northern sector was easily repulsed, as the Germans had to advance over a narrow dike through the inundations, despite supporting air strikes by dive bombers. However, the bombardment caused the battalions in the main positions to flee, and the entire line had to be abandoned around 14:00 despite the southern part being supported by the French torpedo boat L'Incomprise.

On 16 May SS-Standarte Deutschland, several kilometres to the west of the Zanddijk Position, approached the Canal through Zuid-Beveland, where the French 271e Régiment d'Infanterie was present, only partly dug in and now reinforced by the three retreated Dutch battalions. An aerial bombardment that morning routed the defenders before the ground attack had even started; the first German crossings around 11:00 led to a complete collapse. A planned attempt in the evening of the same day to force the eight hundred metres long Sloedam, over which most of the French troops had fled to Walcheren, was cancelled when an armoured reconnaissance patrol ran into French resistance which knocked out one of the armoured cars. On 16 May the island of Tholen was taken against light opposition; on 17 May Schouwen-Duiveland fell.

While the commanders of the remaining Dutch troops on South-Beveland refused direct commands by their superior to threaten the German flank, on 17 May a night attack at 03:00 across the Sloedam failed. The Germans now demanded the capitulation of the island; when this was refused they bombed Arnemuiden and Flushing. Middelburg, the province's capital city, was heavily shelled by artillery, its inner city partially burning down. The heavy bombardment demoralised the largely French defenders, and the Germans managed to establish a bridgehead around noon. The few Dutch troops present on Walcheren, about three companies, ceased their resistance. In the evening the encroaching Germans threatened to overrun the French forces that had fled into Flushing, but a gallant delaying action led by brigade-general Marcel Deslaurens in person, in which he was killed, allowed most troops to be evacuated over the Western Scheldt.

After North-Beveland had surrendered on 18 May, Zeelandic Flanders was the last remaining unoccupied Dutch homeland territory. On orders of the French, all Dutch troops were withdrawn on 19 May to Ostend in Belgium, as their presence would be demoralising and confusing to their own forces. On 27 May all of Zeelandic Flanders had been occupied.

== Aftermath ==
Following the Dutch defeat, Queen Wilhelmina established a government-in-exile in Britain. The German occupation officially began on 17 May 1940. It would be five years before the entire country was liberated, during which time over 210,000 inhabitants of the Netherlands became victims of war, among them 104,000 Jews and other minorities, victims of genocide. Another 70,000 more may have died from indirect consequences, such as poor nutrition or limited medical services.

== See also ==
- Marine memorial
- List of Dutch military equipment of World War II
- Free Dutch Forces
