= Marine memorial =

War memorial in the Netherlands

- Mariniersmonument
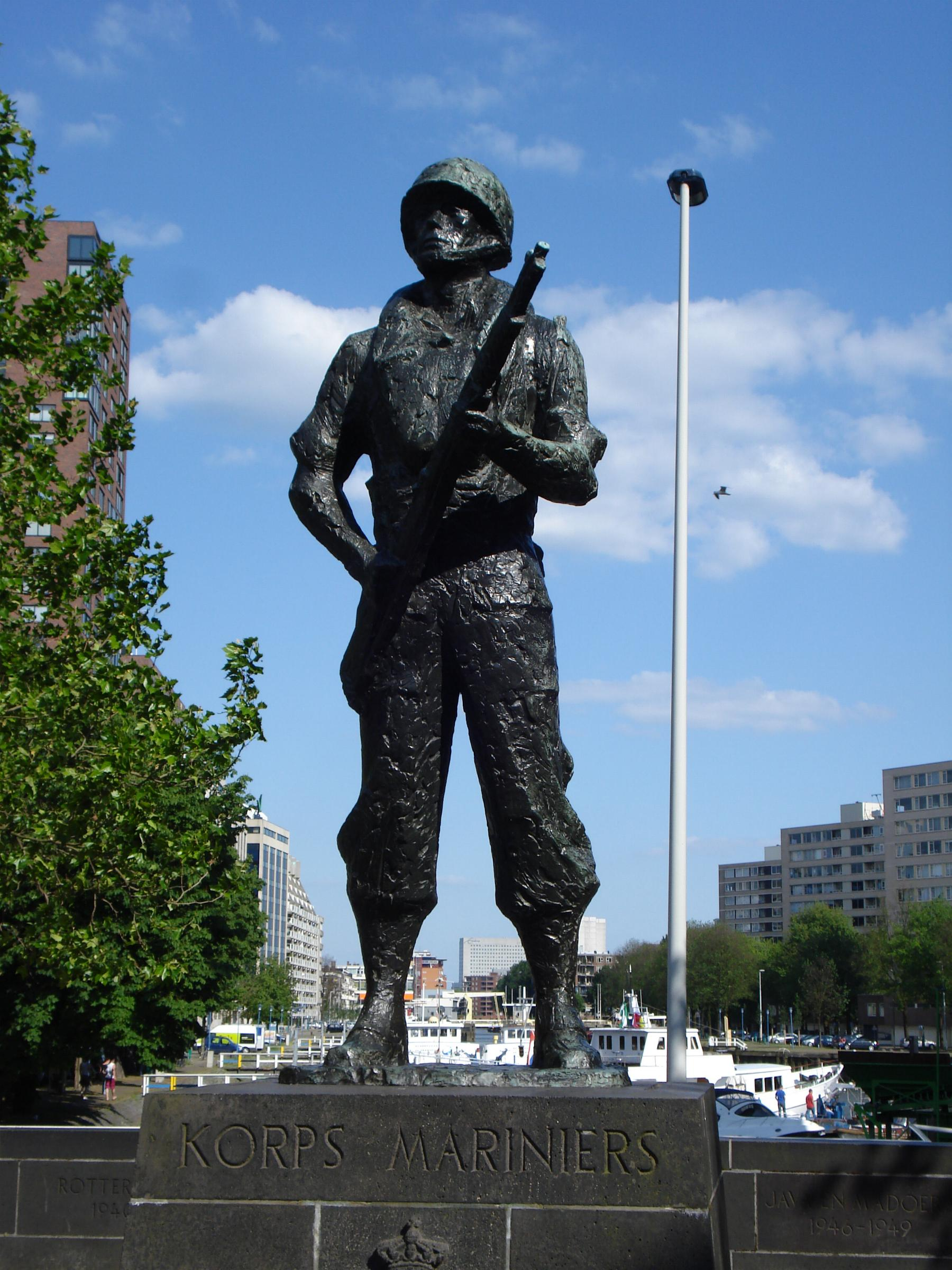
- Interactive map of Marine memorial
- Coordinates: 51°55′20.55″N 4°29′52.33″E
- Designer: Titus Leeser
- Material: Bronze
- Height: 3 m
- Opening date: 5 July 1963

The Marine memorial (Dutch: Mariniersmonument) is a war memorial on Oostplein in Rotterdam, Netherlands. It commemorates and thanks the Netherlands Marine Corps who fought hard for the city in the Battle of the Netherlands.

The monument, a bronze statue of a marine, was made by Titus Leeser and was unveiled by Prince Bernhard on July 5, 1963. It stands on Oostplein, directly opposite the site of the former marines' barracks, which was bombed away in the May days of 1940. The barracks were located here from 1869 to 1940 in the former arsenal of the Admiralty of Rotterdam. Above the nearby underground entrance is the preserved side gate of the barracks. The wall surrounding the memorial also lists other achievements in the history of the Marine Corps, such as the four-day naval battle at Chatham in 1666, the Dutch East Indies, Korea, Cambodia and Uruzgan.

According to Bram Grisnigt, around 30 Engelandvaarders served in the Marine Corps. These included Marines involved in the defence of the Maas bridges in Rotterdam during the May Days in 1940. From England, a number of Engelandvaarders/marines were sent to the United States to be further trained together with 450 Dutch marines to be deployed later in the war against Japan. Some of them were sent back to England to reinforce the Princess Irene Brigade, which landed at Arromanches on August 8. Before the Dutch marines were deployed against Japan, Japan capitulated. The marines then went to the Dutch East Indies.

At the celebration of the 50th anniversary of the marines' monument on July 4, 2013, former Marine Ben Schierboom was present. He was the model for the monument at the time. The anniversary marked the conclusion of the (extended) anniversary year of the Rotterdam and the Marines Foundation.
