= Raam (river) =

River in Netherlands

Coordinates: 51°46′17″N 5°43′53″E

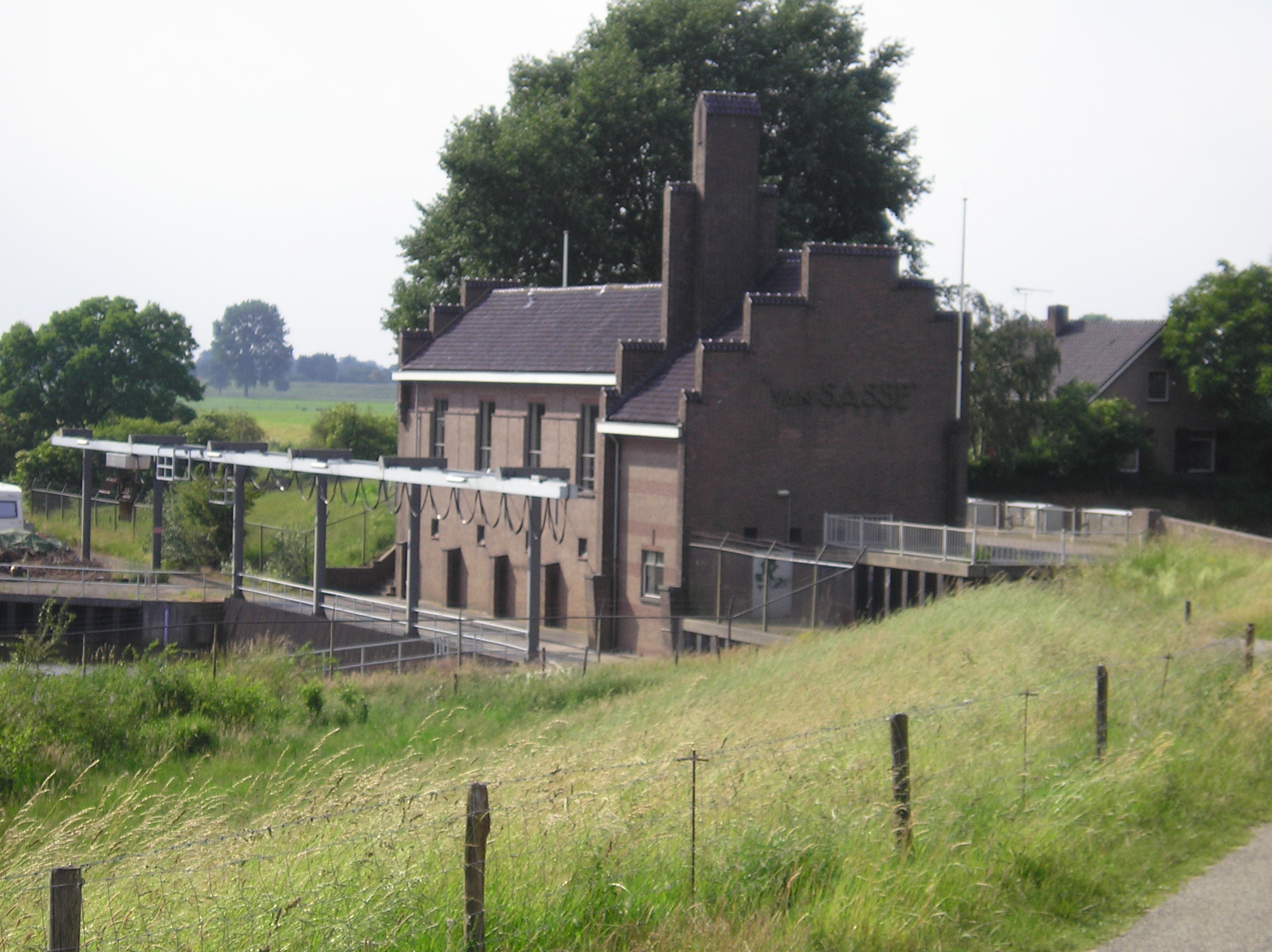
"Gemaal Van Sasse" pumping station in Grave

The Raam is a small river in the eastern part of North Brabant, Netherlands. It flows into the Meuse (Dutch: Maas) at the old town Grave.

== Route ==
The Raam flows in a somewhat meandering course through a semi-open landscape. Upstream, the small river passes wooded banks, estates, and copses, leading to an open area featuring Raamheggen (traditional hedgerows) near Escharen, before finally discharging into the Meuse at Grave.

=== Reroute ===
The Raam Valley is being redeveloped in accordance with the so-called 'Raam Area Plan'. This plan was adopted in 2018 to ensure future-proof water management and the creation of ecological corridors. In this way, the valley serves as a link within the Brabant Nature Network.

== Connections ==
In Grave, the Raam connects to the Hertogswetering. The Hertogswetering serves as an east-west ecological link, connecting the Land van Cuijk with 's-Hertogenbosch.
