= EDK =

EDK may refer to:

- El Dorado/Captain Jack Thomas Memorial Airport, in Kansas, United States
- El Dorado Kitchen, an American restaurant
- Euro death-knot, a knot
- EFI Development Kit
- Erfgoedcentrum Nederlands Kloosterleven (Heritage Centre for Dutch Monastic Life) in Sint Agatha, NL.
