= Linden, Netherlands =

Linden
- Village
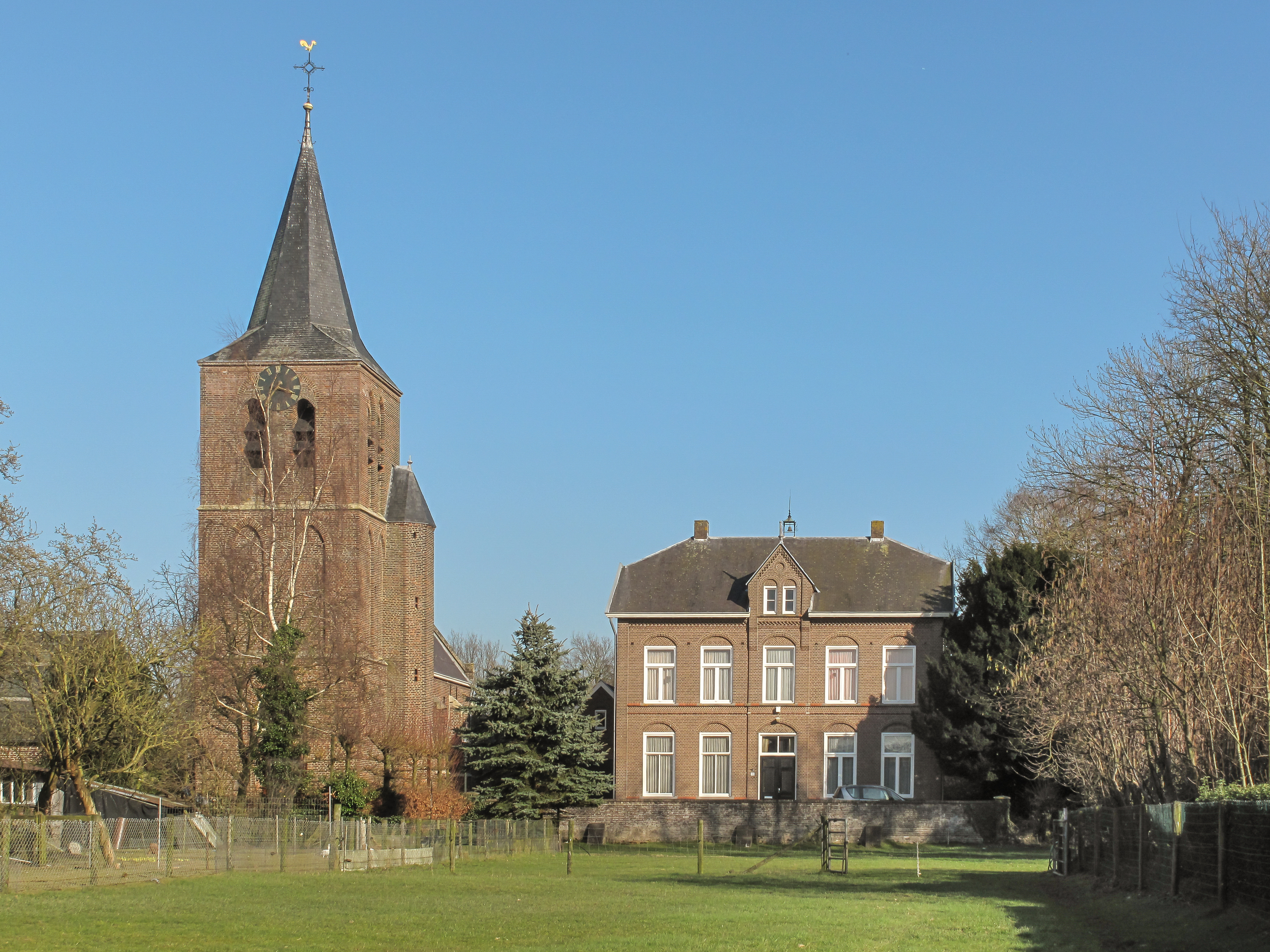
- Saint Lambertus Church

- Location in the province of North Brabant in the Netherlands Linden (Netherlands)
- Coordinates: 51°44′54″N 5°49′57″E
- Country: Netherlands
- Province: North Brabant
- Municipality: Land van Cuijk

Area
  - Total: 6.98 km^{2} (2.69 sq mi)
- Elevation: 9 m (30 ft)

Population (2021)
  - Total: 270
  - Density: 39/km^{2} (100/sq mi)
- Time zone: UTC+1 (CET)
  - Summer (DST): UTC+2 (CEST)
- Postal code: 5439
- Dialing code: 0485

Linden is a village in the Dutch province of North Brabant. It is located in the former municipality of Cuijk, about 10 kilometres (6.2 mi) south of Nijmegen.

== History ==
The village was first mentioned in 1308 as "Kerklienden en Linen". It used to be called "Groot Linden" as to distinguish between Klein Linden. Klein Linden became part of Katwijk and the name reverted to Linden.

The tower of the St Lambertus Church dates from the 15th century and the church was later added to the tower.

Linden was home to 243 people in 1840. Linden was a separate municipality until 1942, when the territory of the municipality was divided between Cuijk en Sint Agatha and Beers. Both Beers and Linden became part of the municipality of Cuijk in 1994, which has been part of the new municipality of Land van Cuijk since 2022.

== Gallery ==
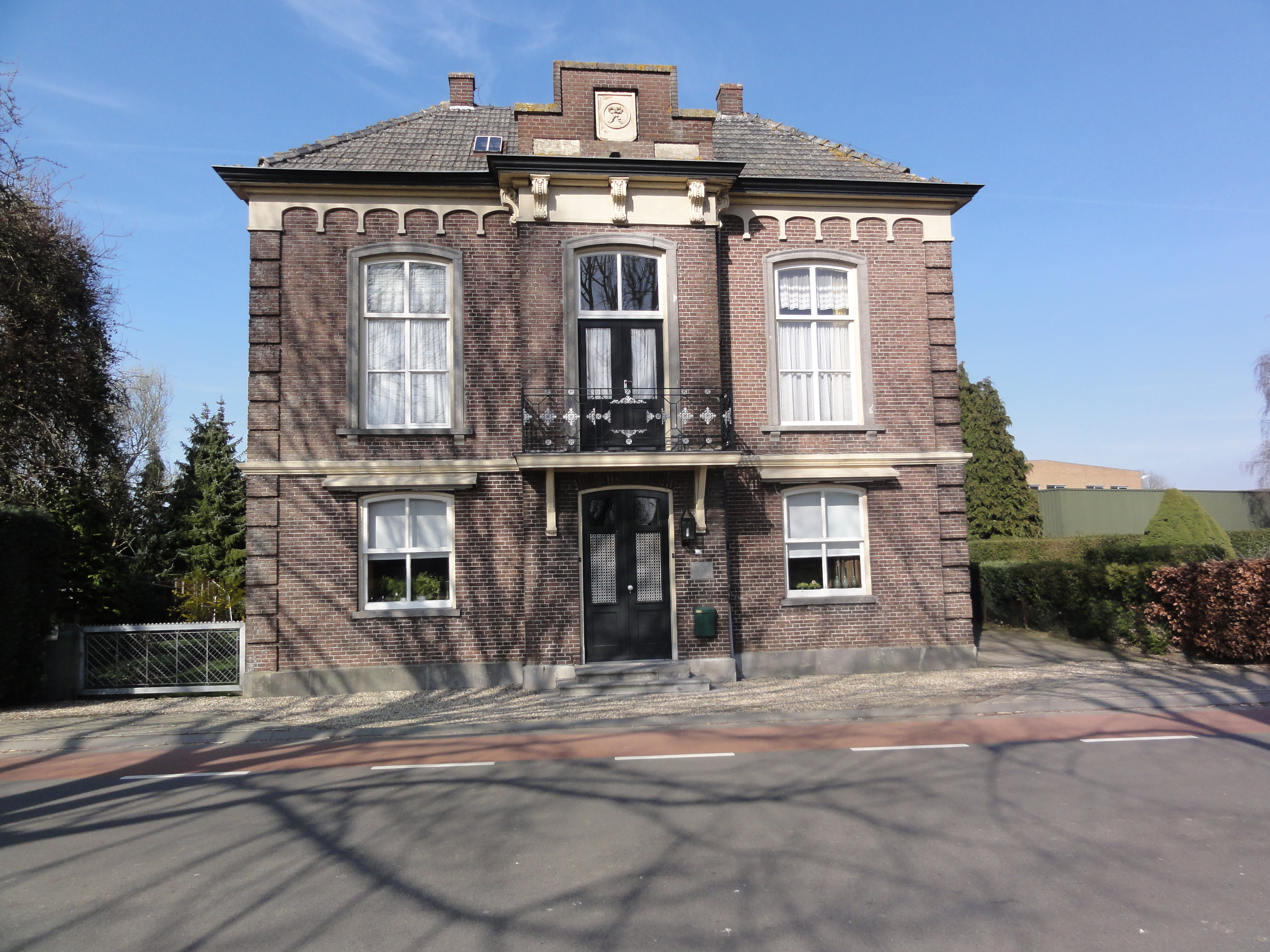
Former town hall

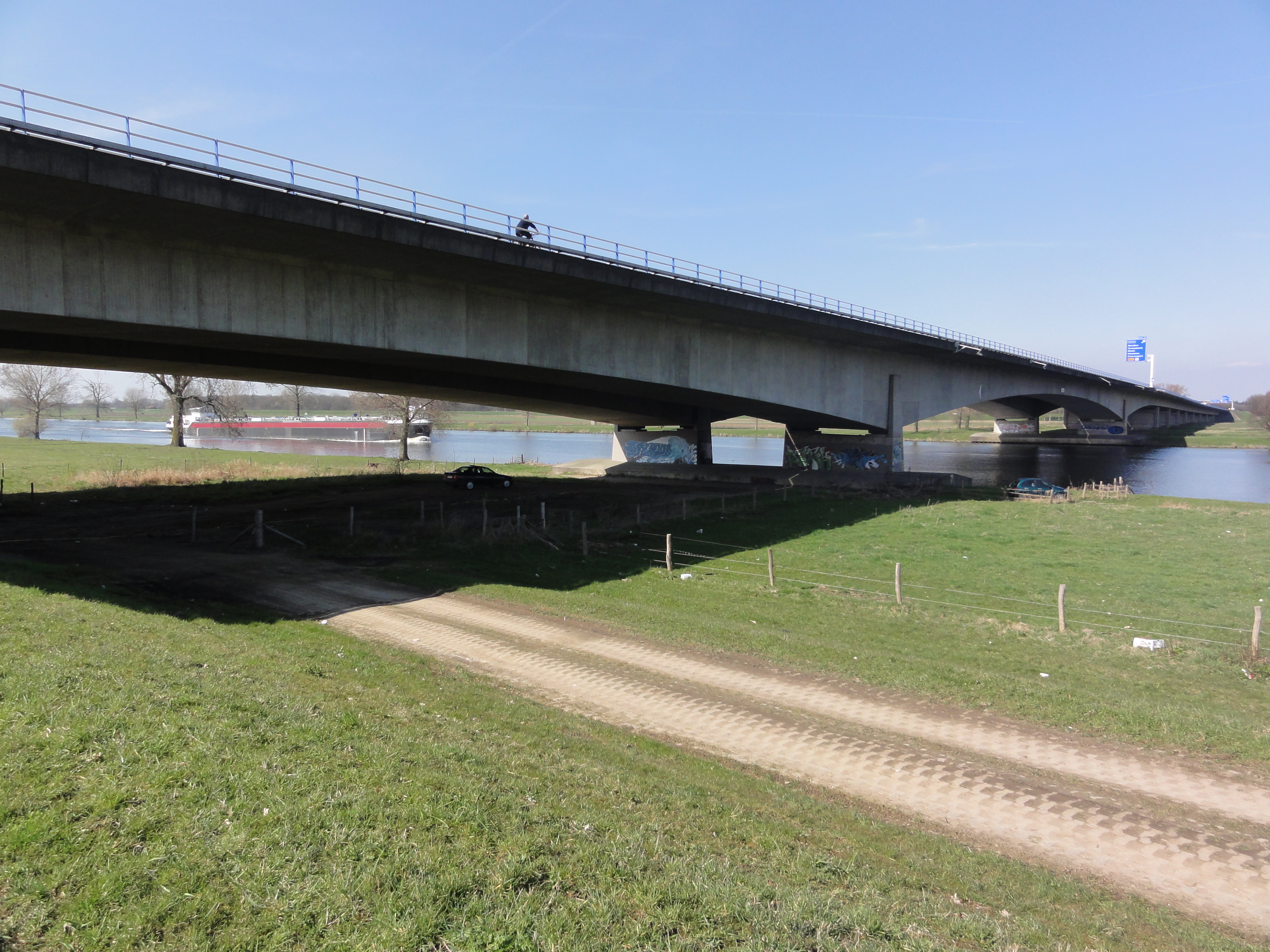
Bridge over the Meuse

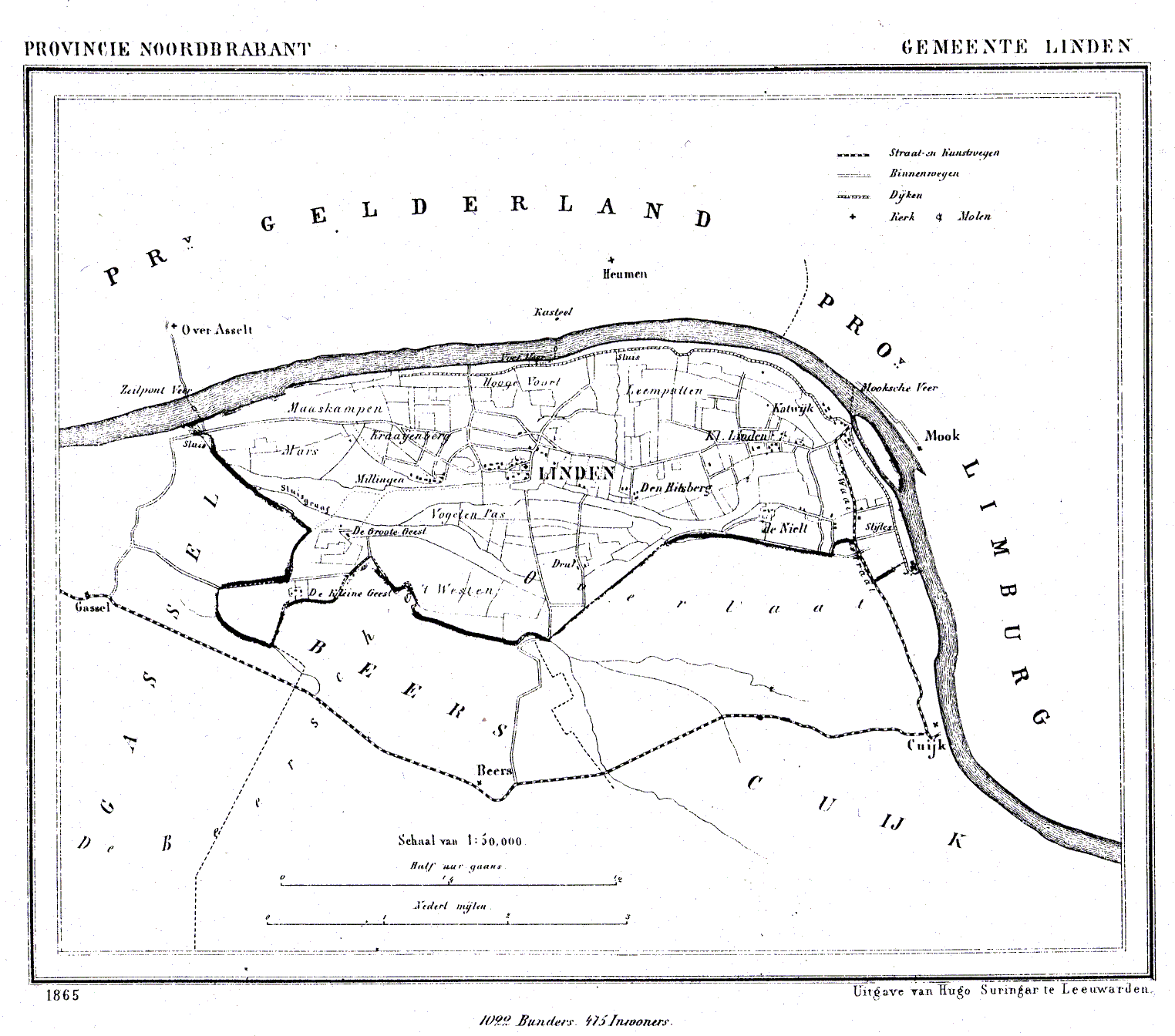
Linden in 1865
