= Gassel =

- Village
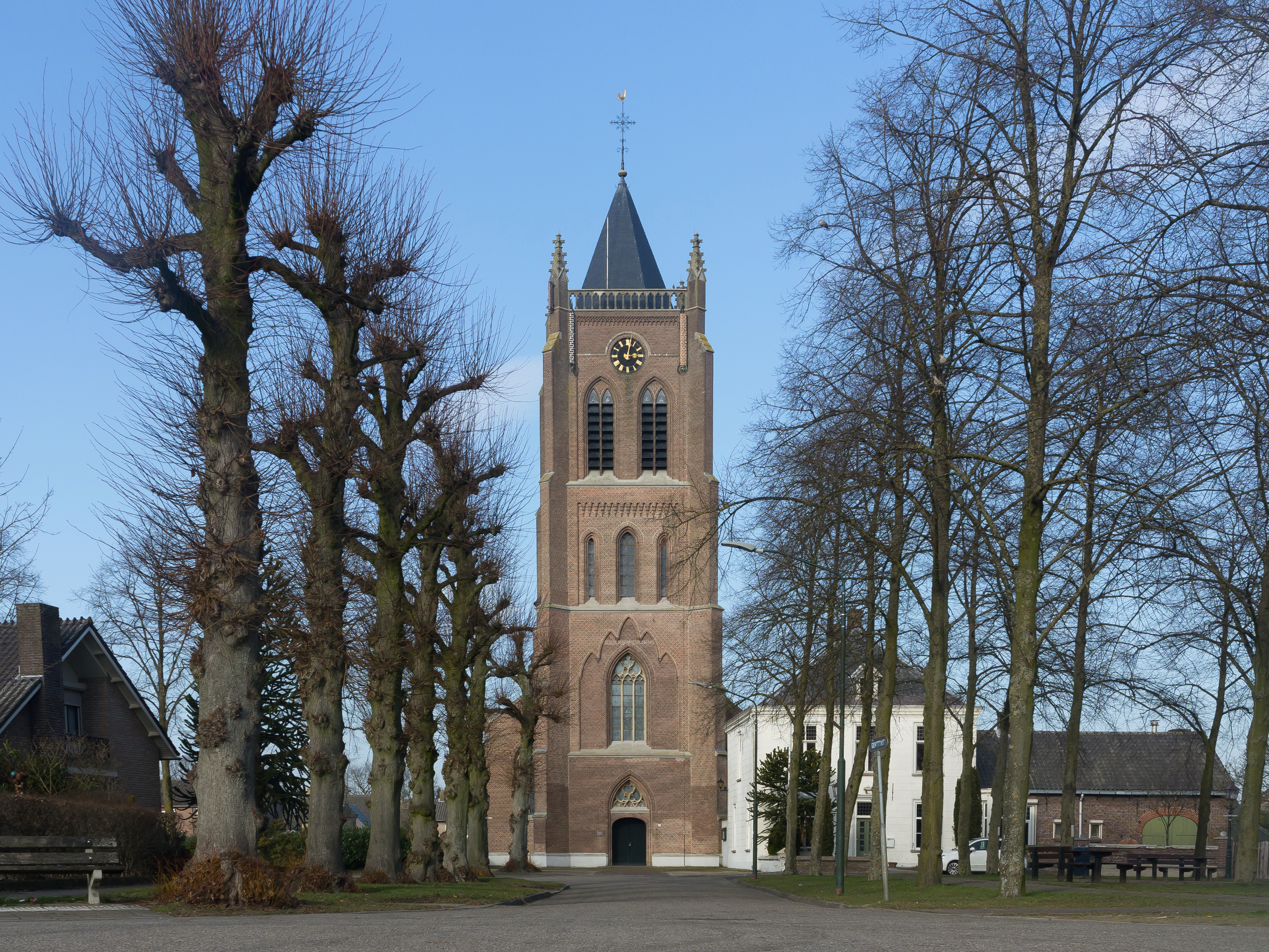
- St John, the Baptist Church

- Location in the province of North Brabant in the Netherlands Gassel (Netherlands)
- Coordinates: 51°44′25″N 5°46′49″E
- Country: Netherlands
- Province: North Brabant
- Municipality: Land van Cuijk

Area
  - Total: 6.65 km^{2} (2.57 sq mi)
- Elevation: 10 m (33 ft)

Population (2021)
  - Total: 1,180
  - Density: 177/km^{2} (460/sq mi)
- Time zone: UTC+1 (CET)
  - Summer (DST): UTC+2 (CEST)
- Postal code: 5438
- Dialing code: 0486

Gassel is a village in the Dutch province of North Brabant. It is located in the former municipality of Grave. Since 2022 it has been part of the new municipality of Land van Cuijk.

== History ==
Gassel was mentioned first in 1485 as Gassel, and means "guesthouse". Gassel probably dates from the Early Middle Ages and developed on a sandy hill.

The St John, the Baptist Church was built in 1875 in Gothic Revival style. It was modified in 1888. The castle Tongelaar is located south of Gassel and was first mentioned in 1292 as belonging to the Lords of Cuijk. The south-western tower dates from the 15th century. Around 1771, the other buildings were constructed.

Gassel was home to 200 people in 1840. Gassel was a separate municipality since the year 1811 until 1942, when it was merged with Beers. In 1994, the municipality of Beers was divided between Cuijk and Grave, and Gassel became incorporated into Grave. In 2022, it was merged into Land van Cuijk.

== Gallery ==
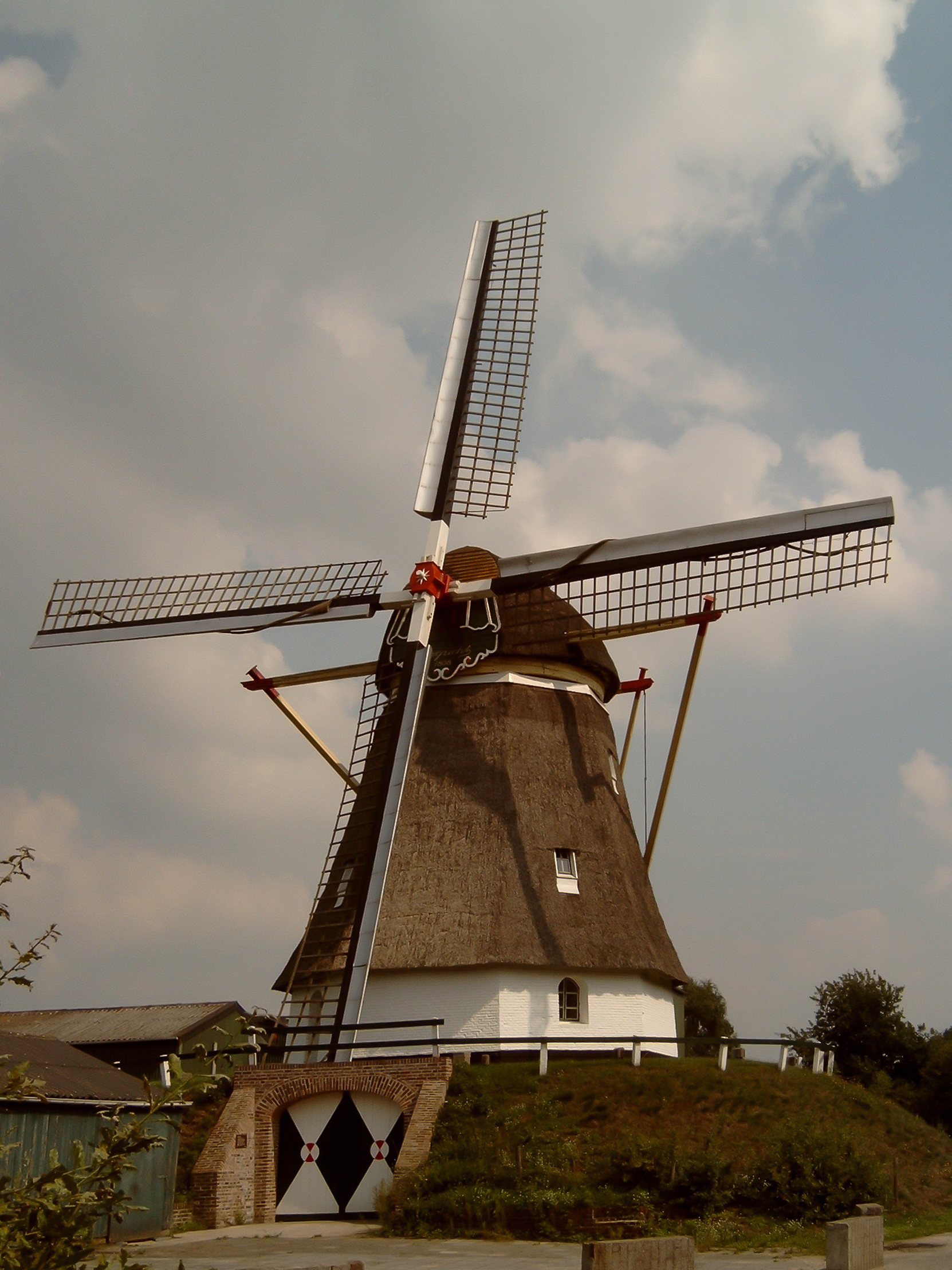
Gassel, windmill

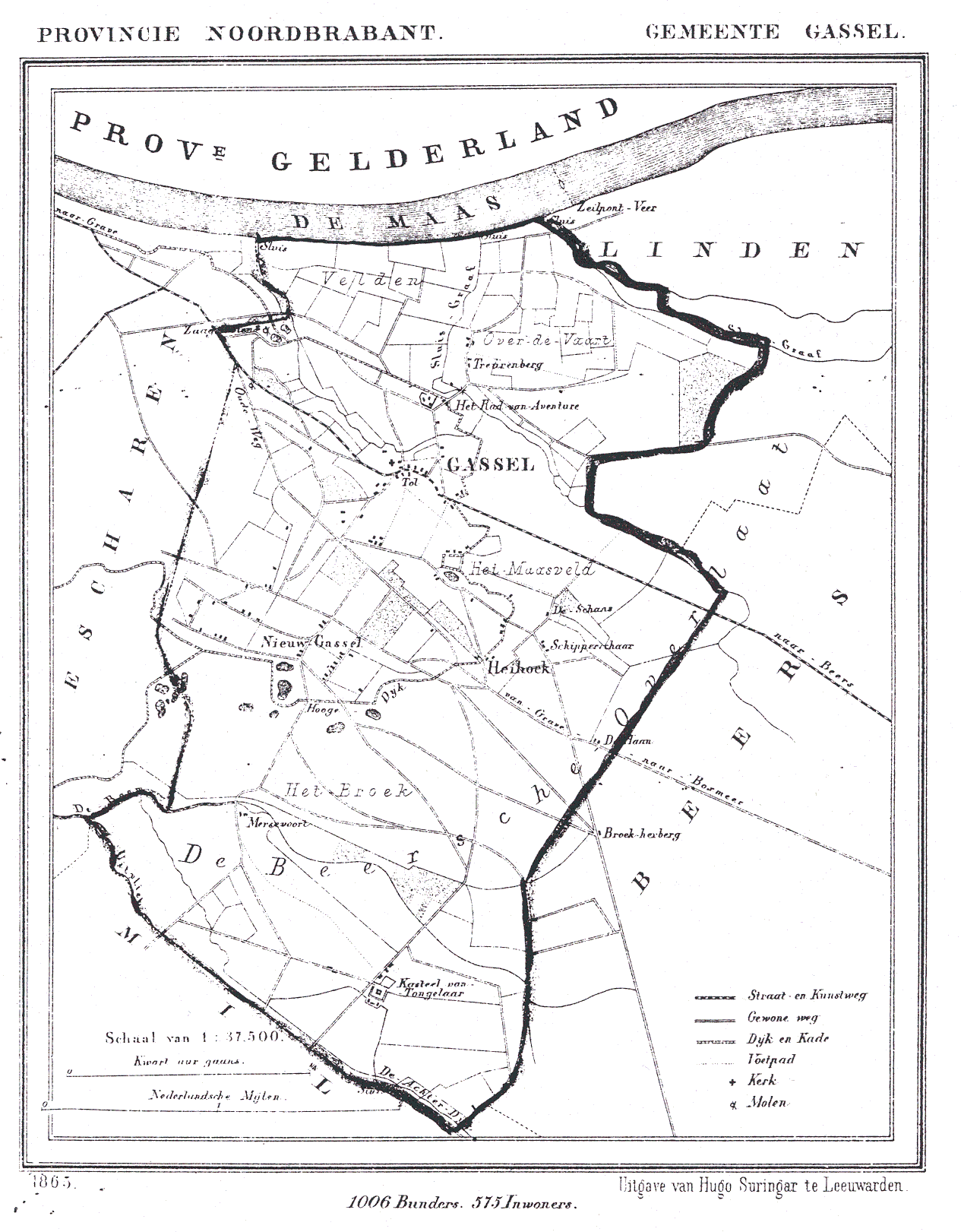
1865 map

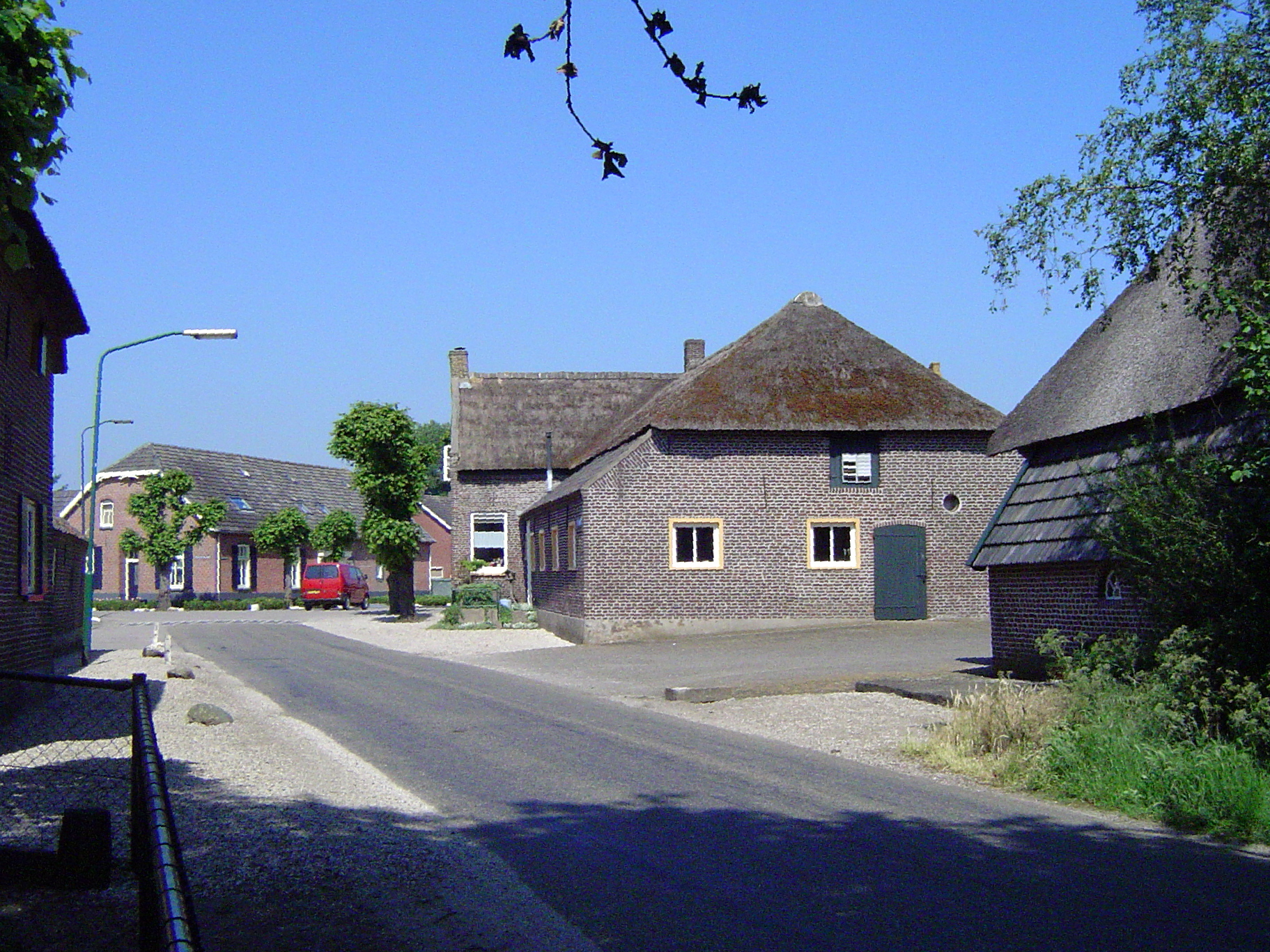
Street view
