= Cuijk en Sint Agatha =

Coordinates: 51°43′N 5°53′E

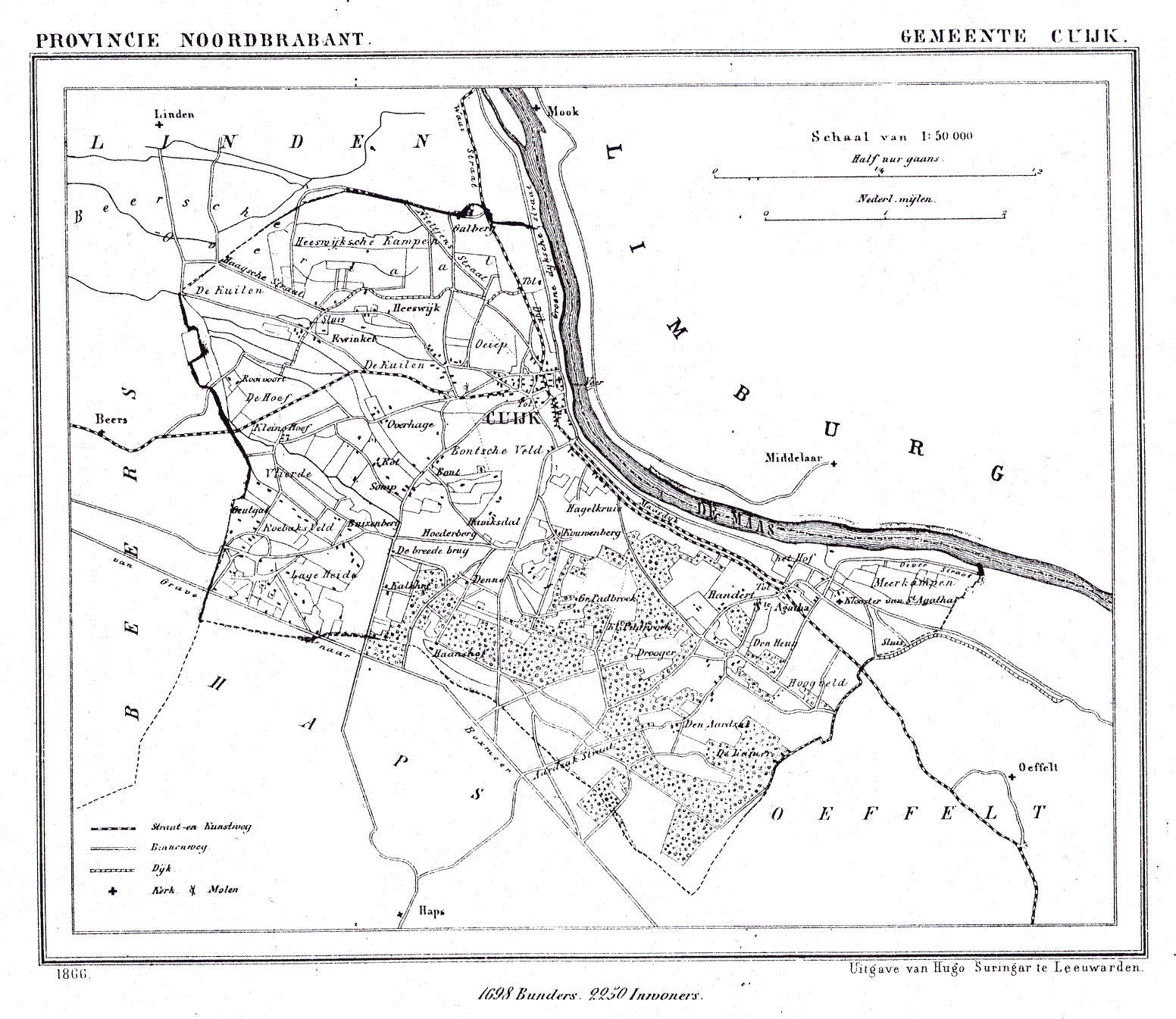
Map of 1866 Cuijik

Cuijk en Sint Agatha is a former municipality in the Dutch province of North Brabant. It covered the villages of Cuijk and Sint Agatha.

On September 4, 1315, a document mentioned a kapel van Sint Agatha onder Kuycbrockele. The Crosier Monastery was founded around 1371. Sint Agatha functioned as an independent village, until it was added to the municipality of Cuijk in 1810, after which the municipality was called Cuijk en Sint Agatha. Cuijk en Sint Agatha merged in 1994 with Beers and Haps, to form the new municipality "Cuijk". Since 2022 Cuijk has been part of the new municipality of Land van Cuijk.

The Monastery of Saint Agatha was founded around 1371. Many missionaries were trained in this monastery, which is the oldest inhabited monastery in the Netherlands.

In June 2006, after a renovation of the monastery, some rooms were taken into use by the Erfgoedcentrum Nederlands Kloosterleven (EDK) (Heritage Centre for Dutch Monastic Life), which houses the heritage collections of many monastic communities. The Centre chiefly houses monastic archive documents, but also preserves and provides access to related books and artefacts. The Order of the Holy Cross themselves also house their heritage collections in Saint Agatha.
