= Harry van Raaij =

Dutch football executive (1936–2020)

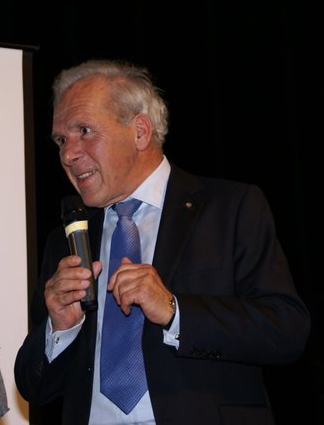
- Harry van Raaij in Sint Anthonis.
- Born: Hendrikus Jacobus Maria van Raaij; 29 August 1936; Haps, Netherlands
- Died: 16 November 2020 (aged 84)
- Occupation: Chairman PSV Eindhoven

Hendrikus Jacobus Maria "Harry" van Raaij (29 August 1936 – 16 November 2020) was a Dutch functionary, who served as the chairman of PSV Eindhoven, a Dutch sports club, between 1996 and 2004.

== Biography ==
Van Raaij was born in Haps on 29 August 1936. He was a proponent of the Atlantic League, which would have been a competition for larger clubs in smaller European countries. Professionally, he was a manager at Philips.

Van Raaij died on 16 November 2020 at the age of 84.
