= Atlantic League (disambiguation) =

The Atlantic League of Professional Baseball is an independent professional baseball league founded in 1998.

Atlantic League may also refer to:

- Atlantic League (1896–1900), a professional baseball league active from 1896 to 1900
- Atlantic League (1914), a professional baseball league active in 1914
- Atlantic League (football), a proposed European association football competition
- Atlantic League (1994–1996), one of the ice hockey leagues that formed the Six Nations Tournament
