= Beers, North Brabant =

Beers
- Village
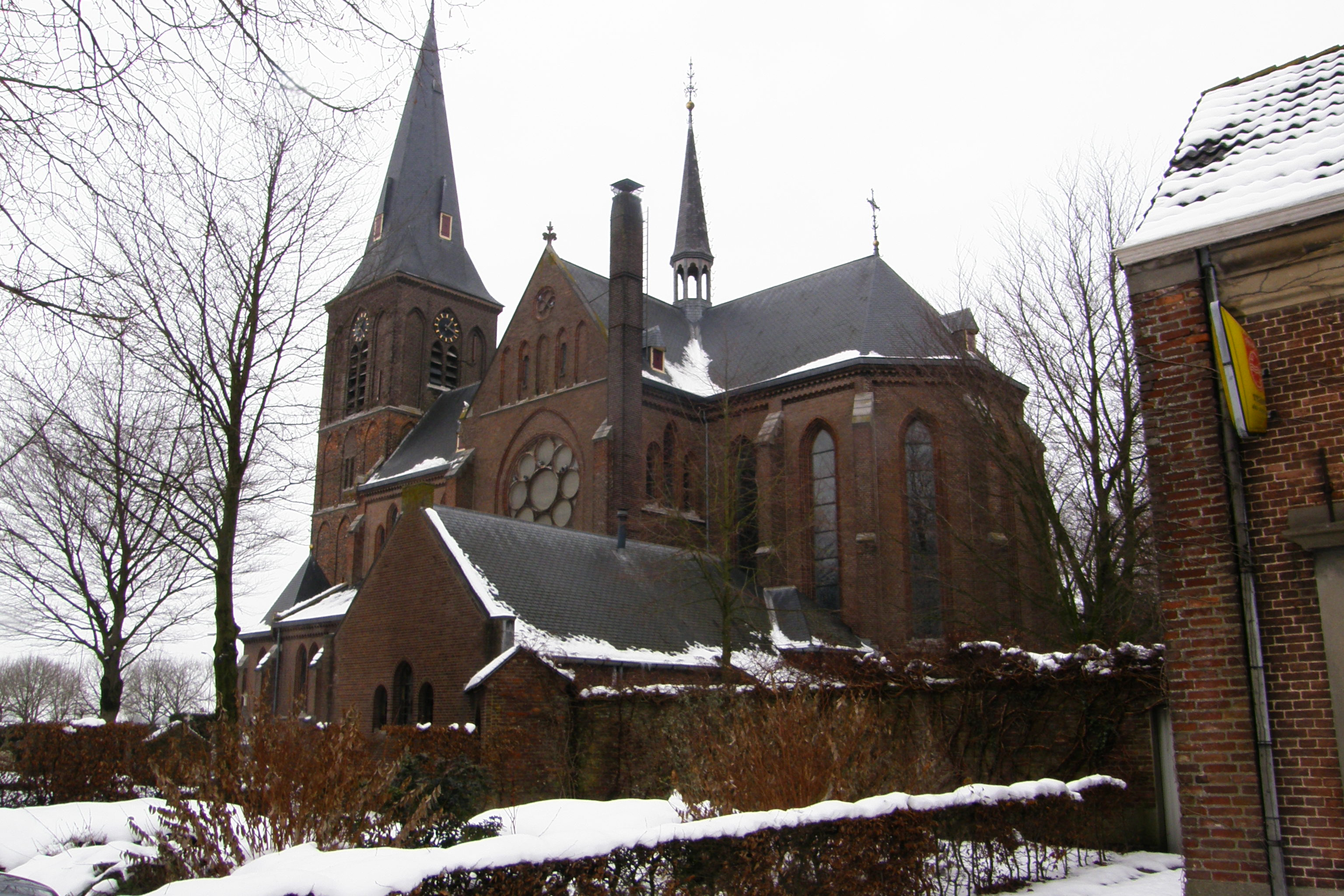
- Catholic church

- Coat of arms

- Location in the province of North Brabant in the Netherlands Beers (Netherlands)
- Coordinates: 51°43′28″N 5°49′49″E
- Country: Netherlands
- Province: North Brabant
- Municipality: Land van Cuijk

Area
  - Total: 13.38 km^{2} (5.17 sq mi)
- Elevation: 11 m (36 ft)

Population (2021)
  - Total: 1,725
  - Density: 128.9/km^{2} (333.9/sq mi)
- Time zone: UTC+1 (CET)
  - Summer (DST): UTC+2 (CEST)
- Postal code: 5437
- Dialing code: 0485

Beers (Brabants: Bèèrs) is a village in the former Dutch municipality of Cuijk. It is located about 4 km west of Cuijk. Since 2022 it has been part of the new municipality of Land van Cuijk.

Beers has a population of about 1,721, of which 1,305 reside in the village itself, and 416 in the surrounding countryside, including the hamlets De Plaats and Dommelsvoort.

Until 1994, Beers was a separate municipality.

== Toponymy ==
The name Beers might come from bere or baren, which can mean mud or stuff in Dutch.

== History ==
Beers is first noted in a document that was written between 1050 and 1200. In it Beers was named Berse. The family Van Beerse was a vassal from the Lord of Cuijk, making Beers belong to the municipality of Cuijk. This vassal however, did own a small castle surrounded by a moat, named De Broekhof.

Around 1814, at the end of the French age and at the beginning of the Kingdom of the Netherlands, Beers became a separate municipality. In 1942, Great-Linden and Gassel joined Beers. In 1994 the municipality of Beers was repealed. Gassel joined the municipality of Grave, North Brabant, while Beers and Great-Linden (today Linden, North Brabant) joined Cuijk.

== Gallery ==
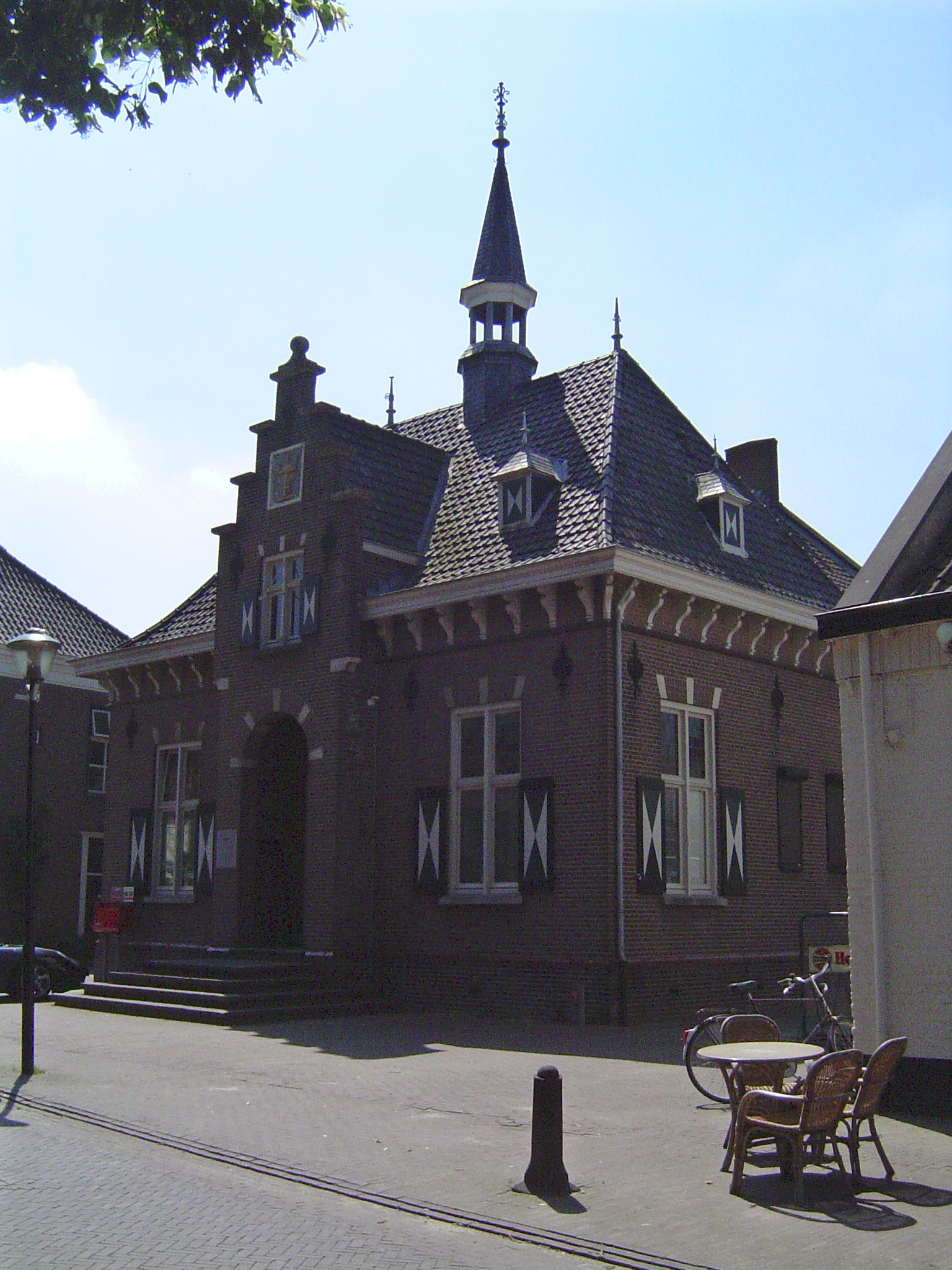
The former municipal hall of Beers.

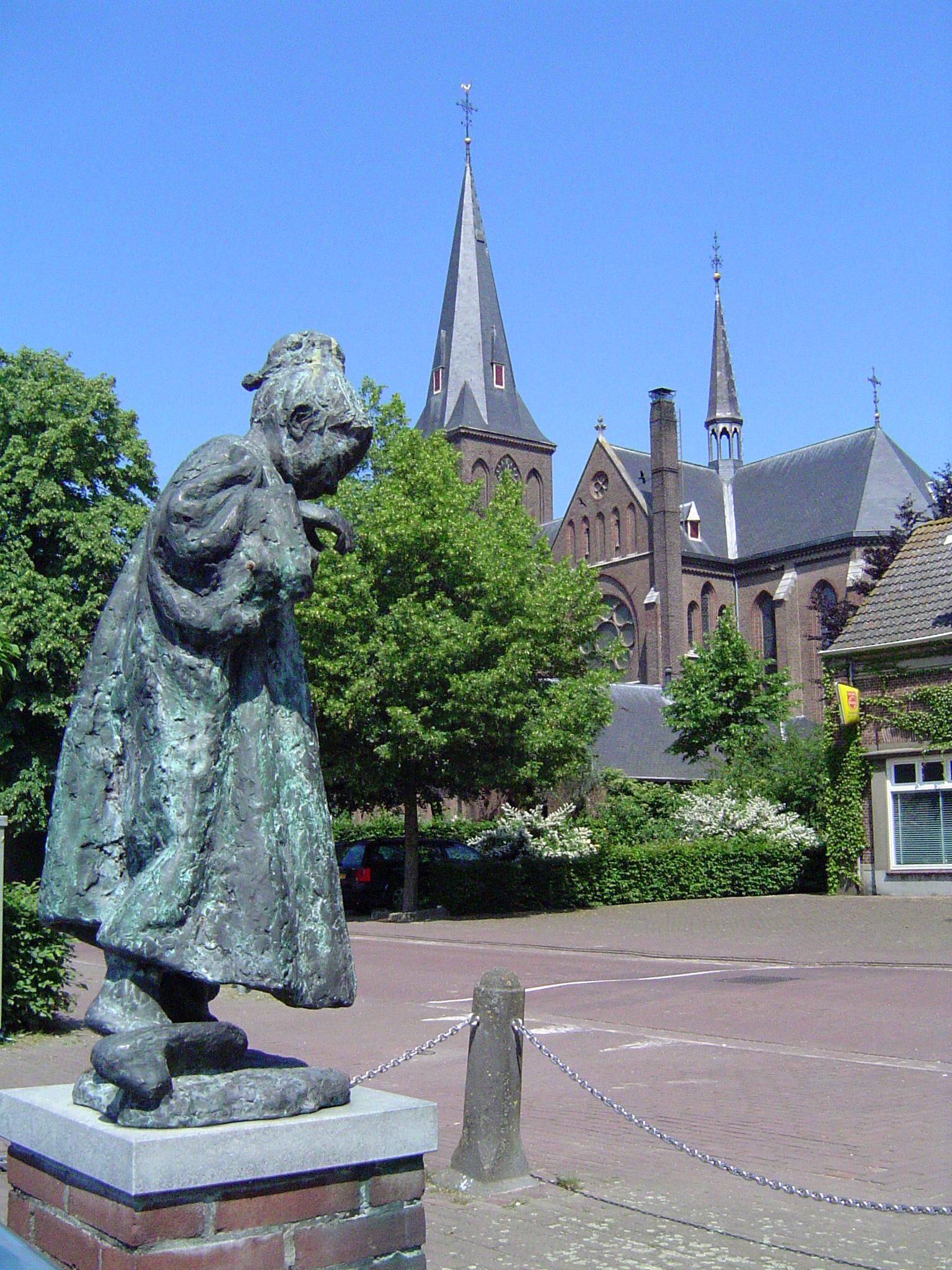
Beers, church and statue of child dressed up as elderly woman

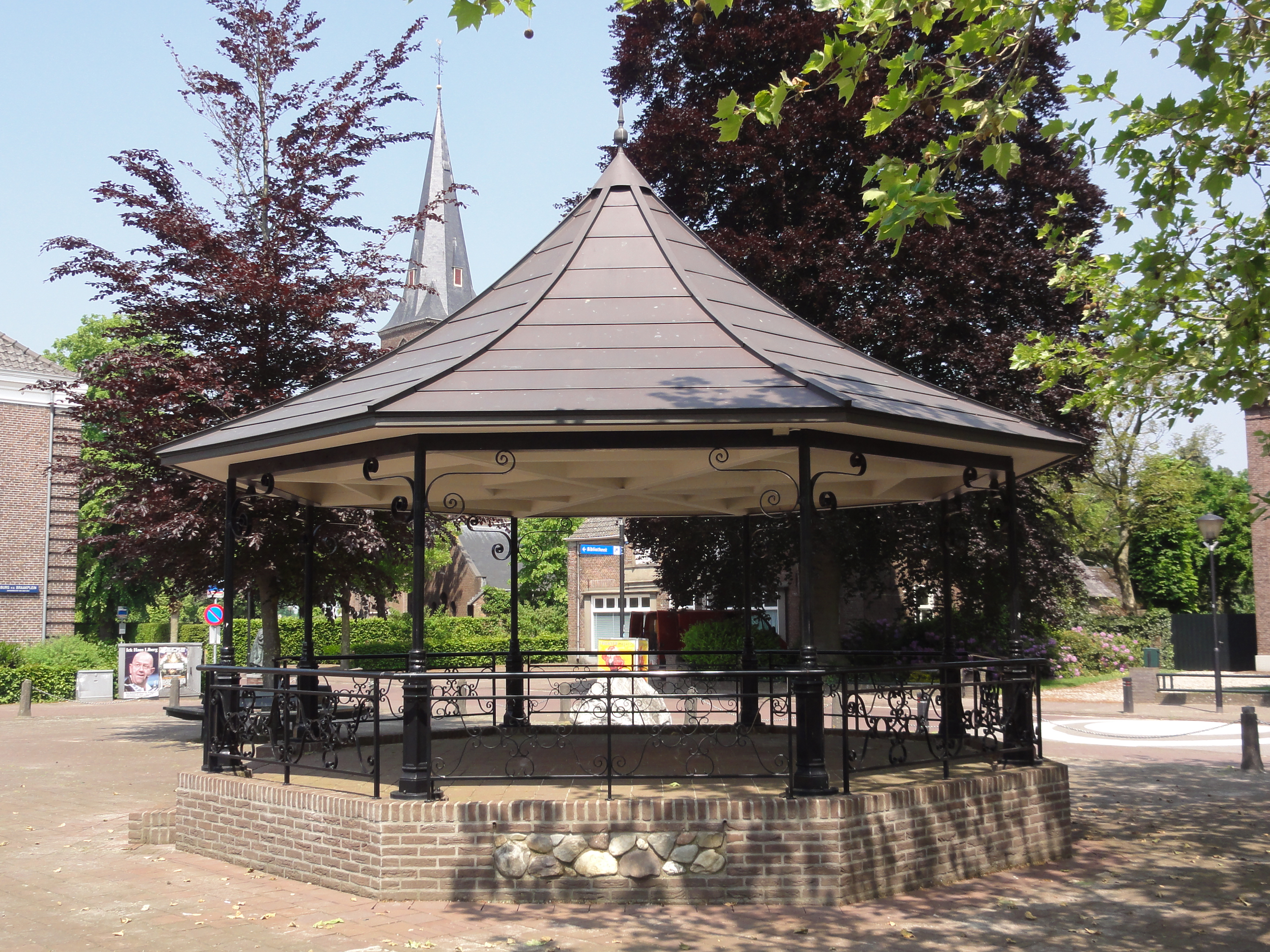
Bandstand

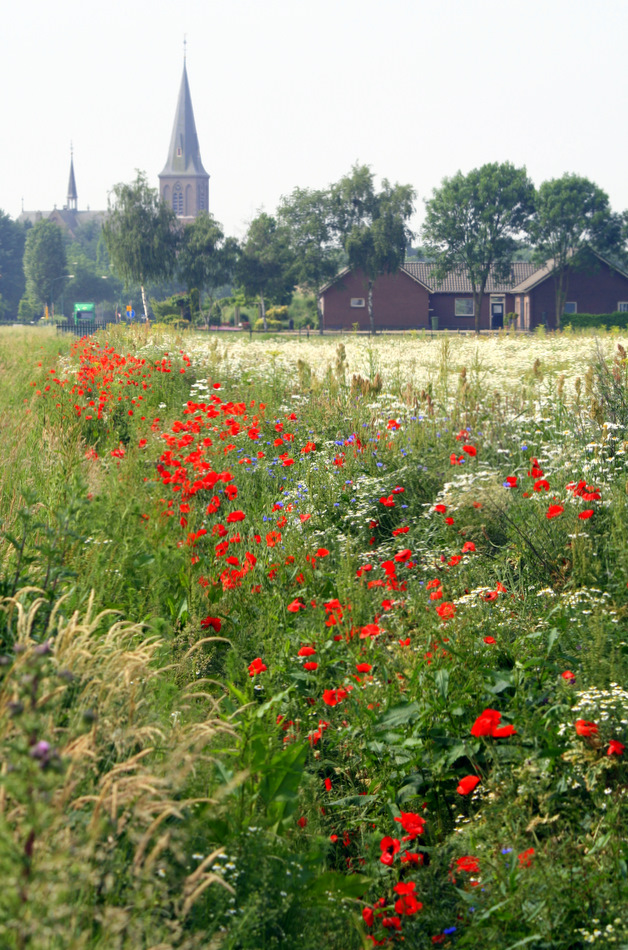
View on Beers
