= Cuijk (municipality) =

Municipality in North Brabant, Netherlands

- Former municipality
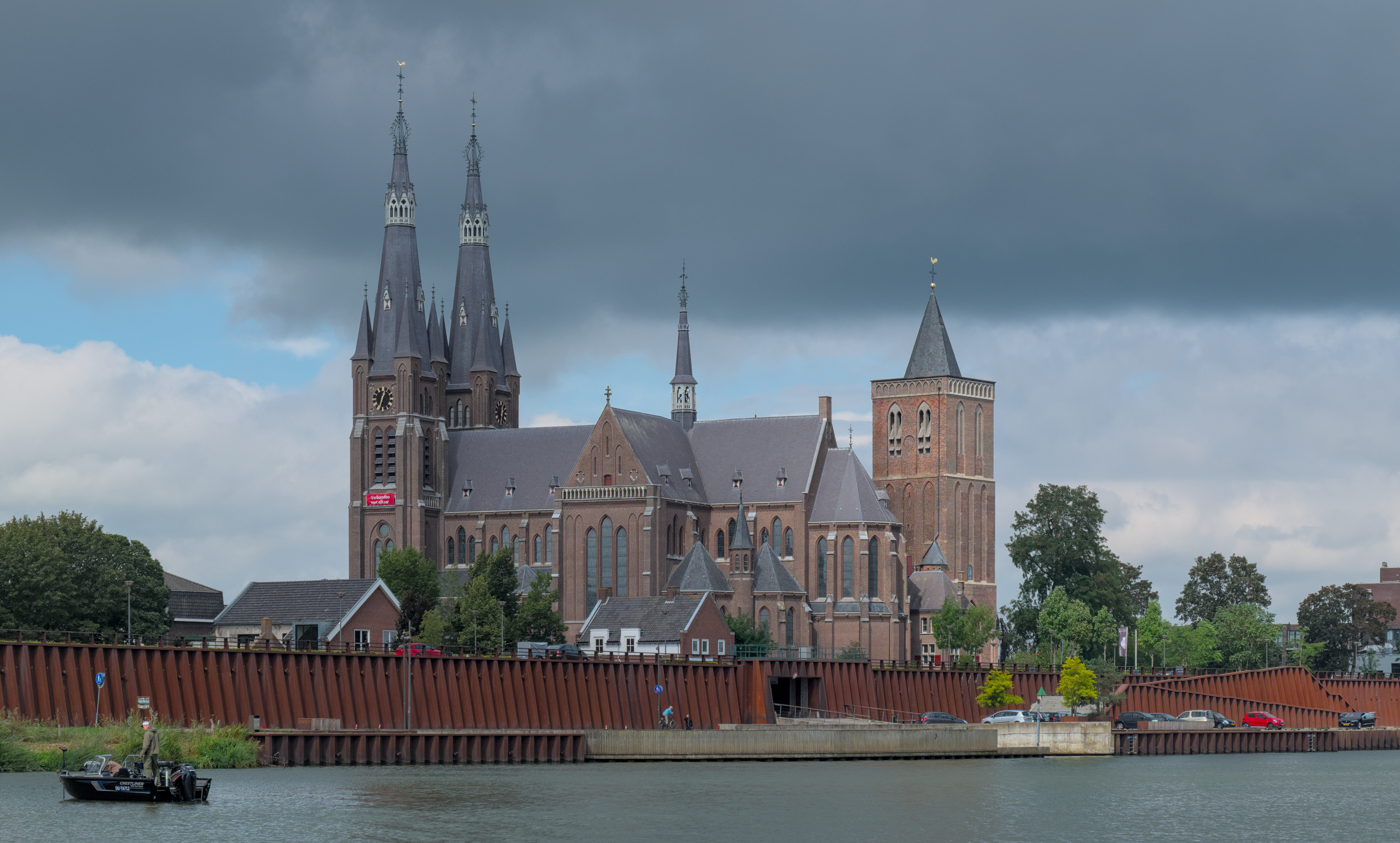
- Monumental church in Cuijk

- Flag Coat of arms

- Location of the former municipality of Cuijk in North Brabant
- Coordinates: 51°44′N 5°53′E
- Country: Netherlands
- Province: North Brabant
- Municipality: Land van Cuijk

Area
  - Total: 57.07 km^{2} (22.03 sq mi)
  - Land: 51.16 km^{2} (19.75 sq mi)
  - Water: 5.91 km^{2} (2.28 sq mi)
- Elevation: 12 m (39 ft)

Population (January 2021)
  - Total: 25,404
  - Density: 497/km^{2} (1,290/sq mi)
- Demonym: Cuijkenaar
- Time zone: UTC+1 (CET)
  - Summer (DST): UTC+2 (CEST)
- Postcode: 5430–5437, 5439
- Area code: 0485
- Website: www.cuijk.nl

Cuijk (Dutch pronunciation: [kœyk]) is a former municipality in upper southeastern Netherlands. Cuijk, Boxmeer, Grave, Mill en Sint Hubert, and Sint Anthonis merged into the new municipality of Land van Cuijk on 1 January 2022.

The former municipality of Cuijk was established by combining the municipalities of Cuijk en Sint Agatha, Beers and Haps in 1994.

== Population centres ==
The main population center Cuijk is of pre-historic origin. Its existence is recorded on the Roman roadmap Tabula Peutingeriana under the name of Ceuclum. It is a big commuter town with good public transport services to nearby Nijmegen. The nearest hospital is at Boxmeer and the nearest international airport is situated in the German town of Weeze. Cuijk railway station is on the Nijmegen to Venlo railway.

Population centers and inhabitants in 2020:

- Cuijk 18,170
- Beers 1,680
- Haps 2,850
- Katwijk 395
- Linden 270
- Sint Agatha 495
- Vianen 1,280

== Topography ==
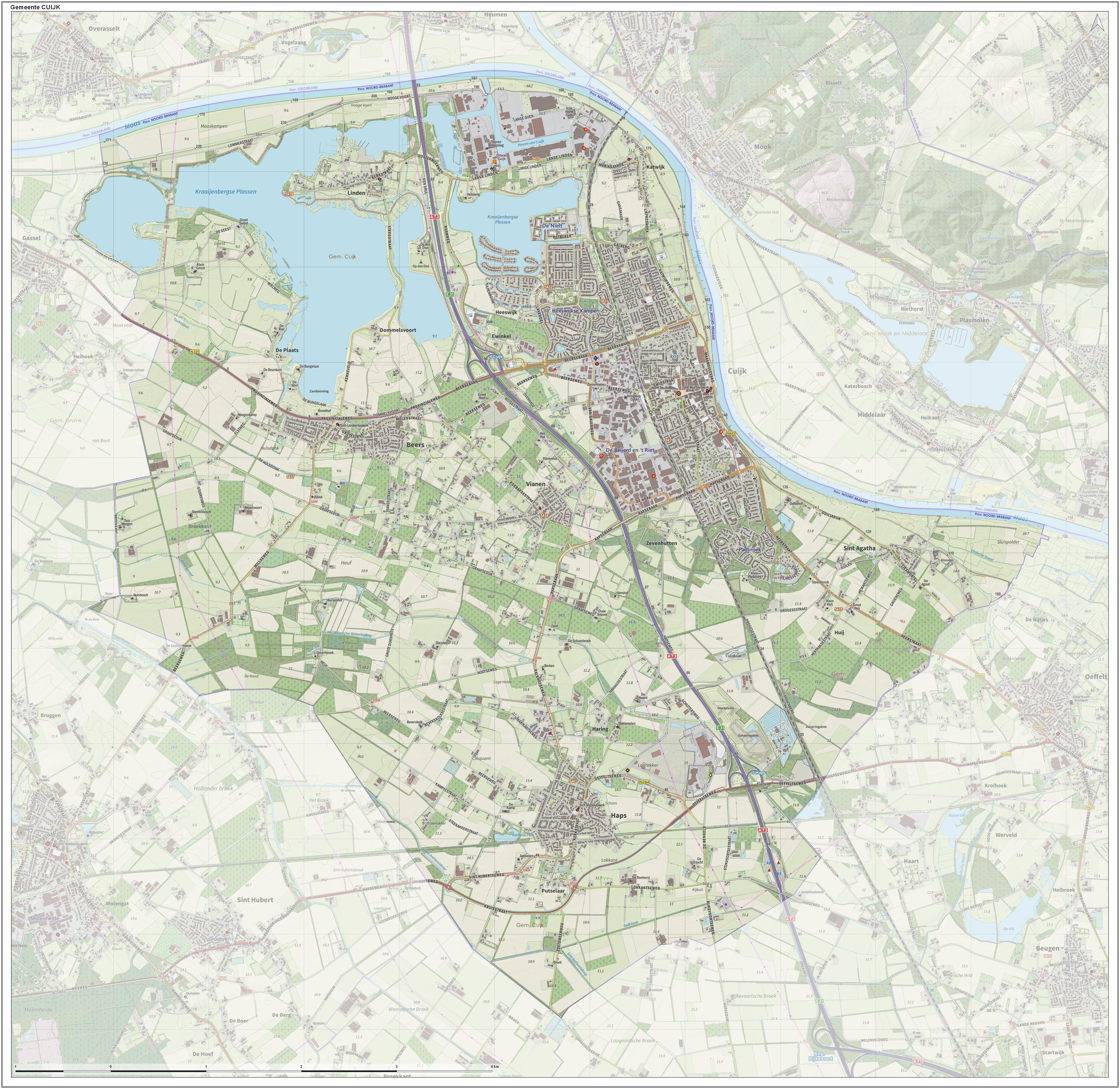

Map of the former municipality of Cuijk, 2015

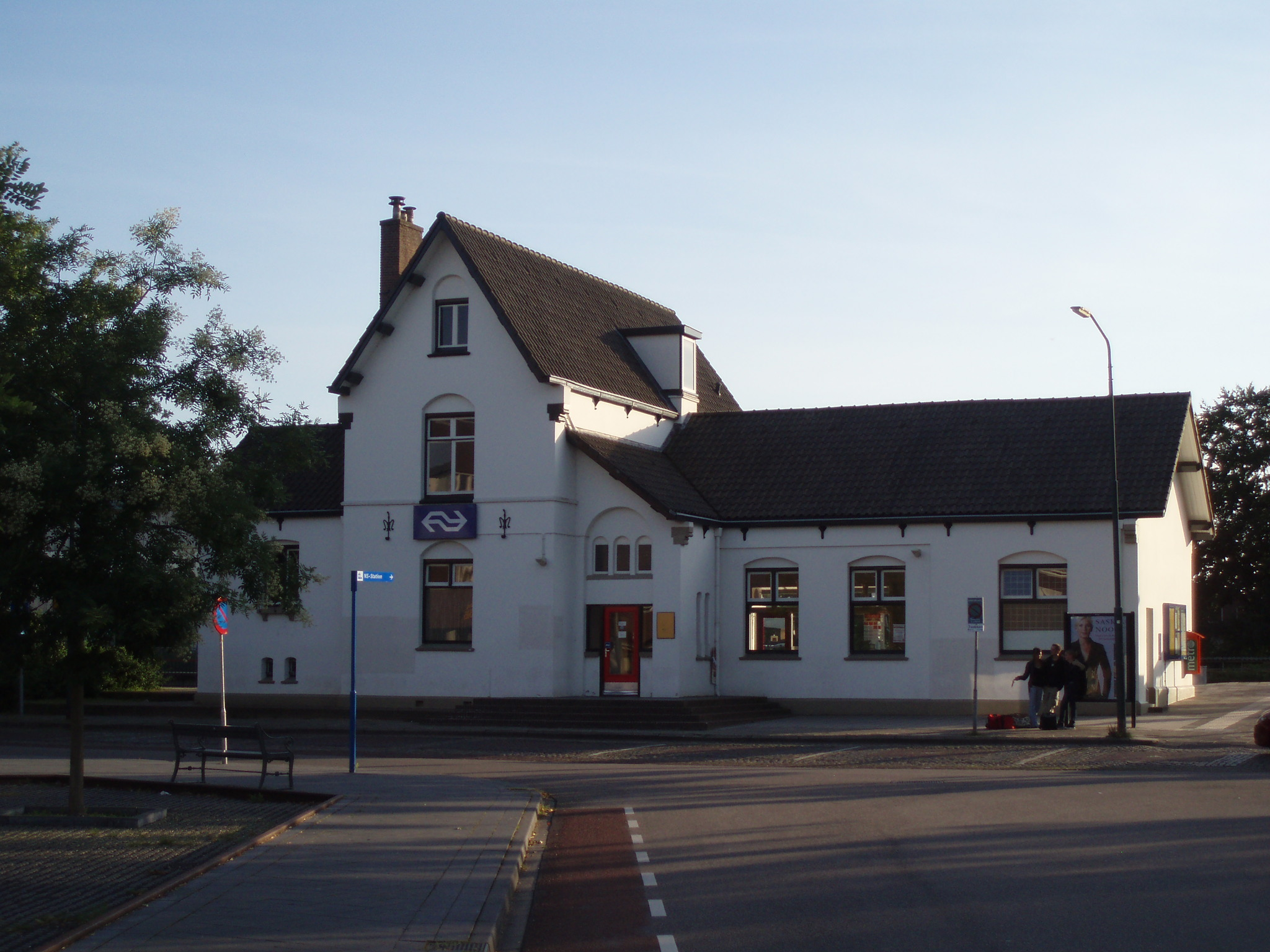
Station, Cuijk

== Transportation ==
- Cuijk railway station

== Twin towns ==
Cuijk was twinned with

- (United Kingdom) Maldon, Essex, UK.
- (Czech Republic) Přerov, Olomoucký kraj, ČR.

== Notable people ==
- Jan de Quay (1901 – 1985 in Beers) Dutch politician, psychologist and Prime Minister of the Netherlands 1959–1963
- Pieter Bogaers (1924 in Cuijk – 2008) Dutch politician
- Jordie van der Laan (born 1993 in Cuijk) Dutch football player

== Gallery ==
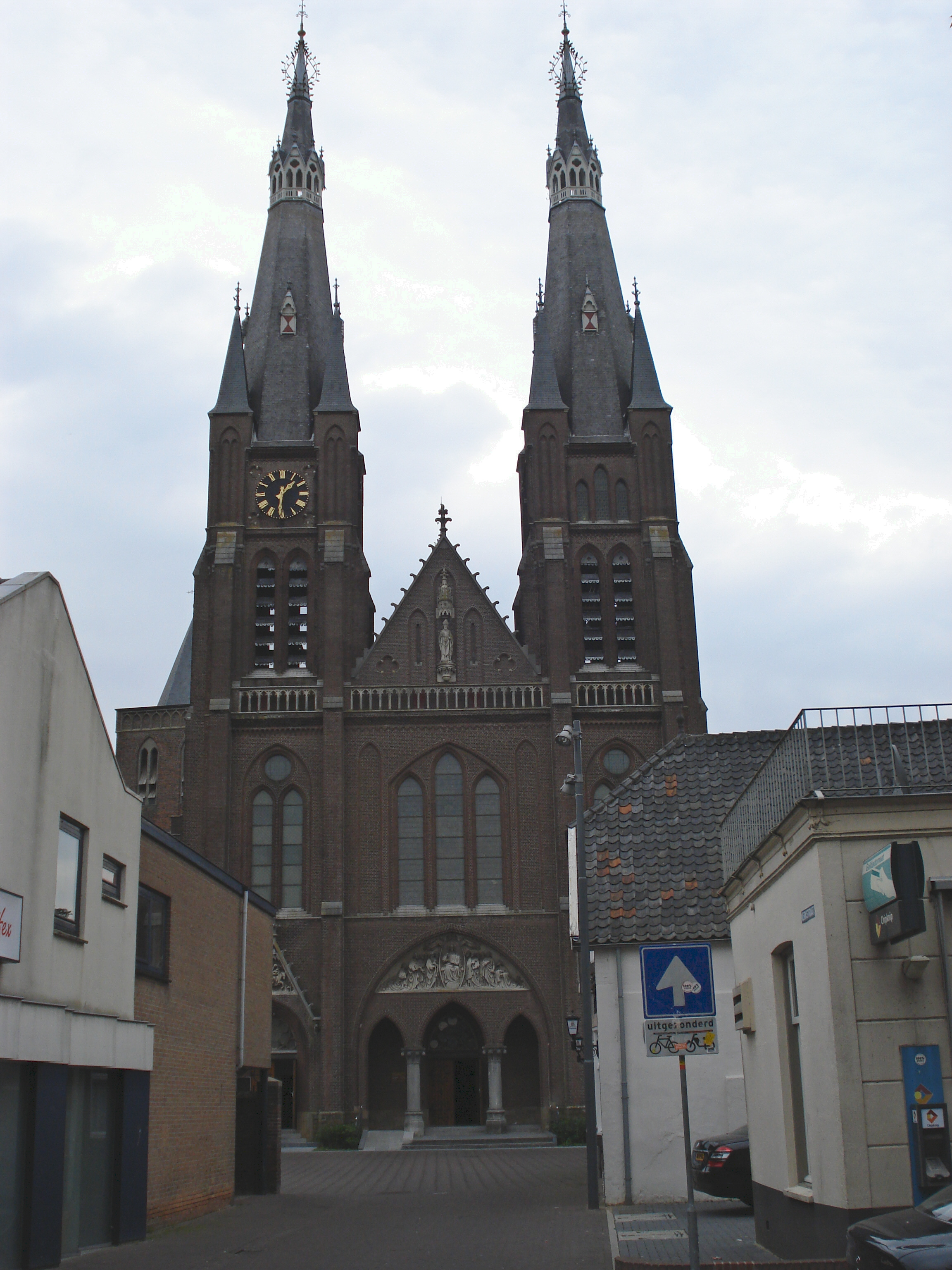
Cuijk, church: Sint-Martinuskerk

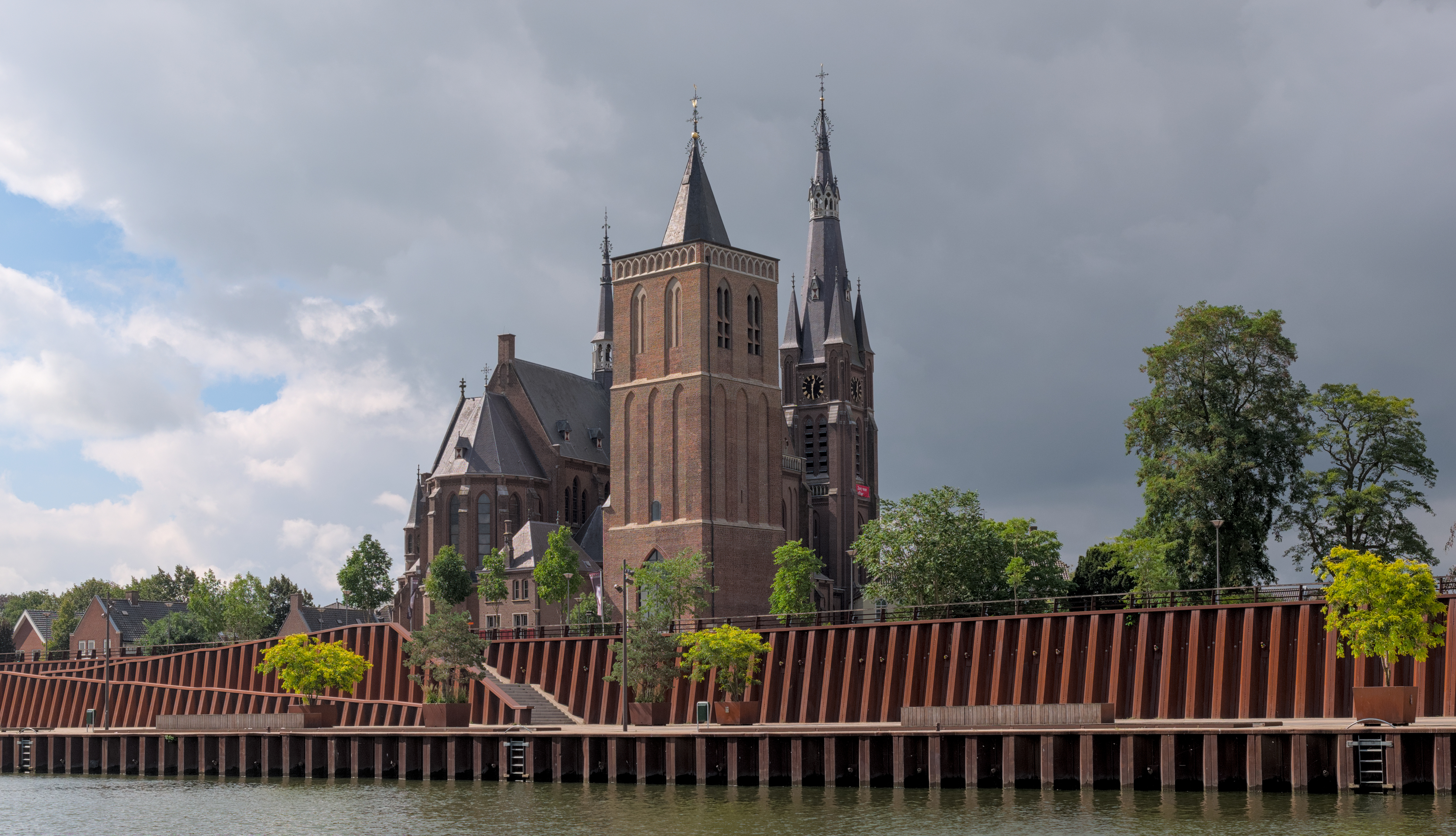
Sint-Martinuskerk viewed from the Maas river

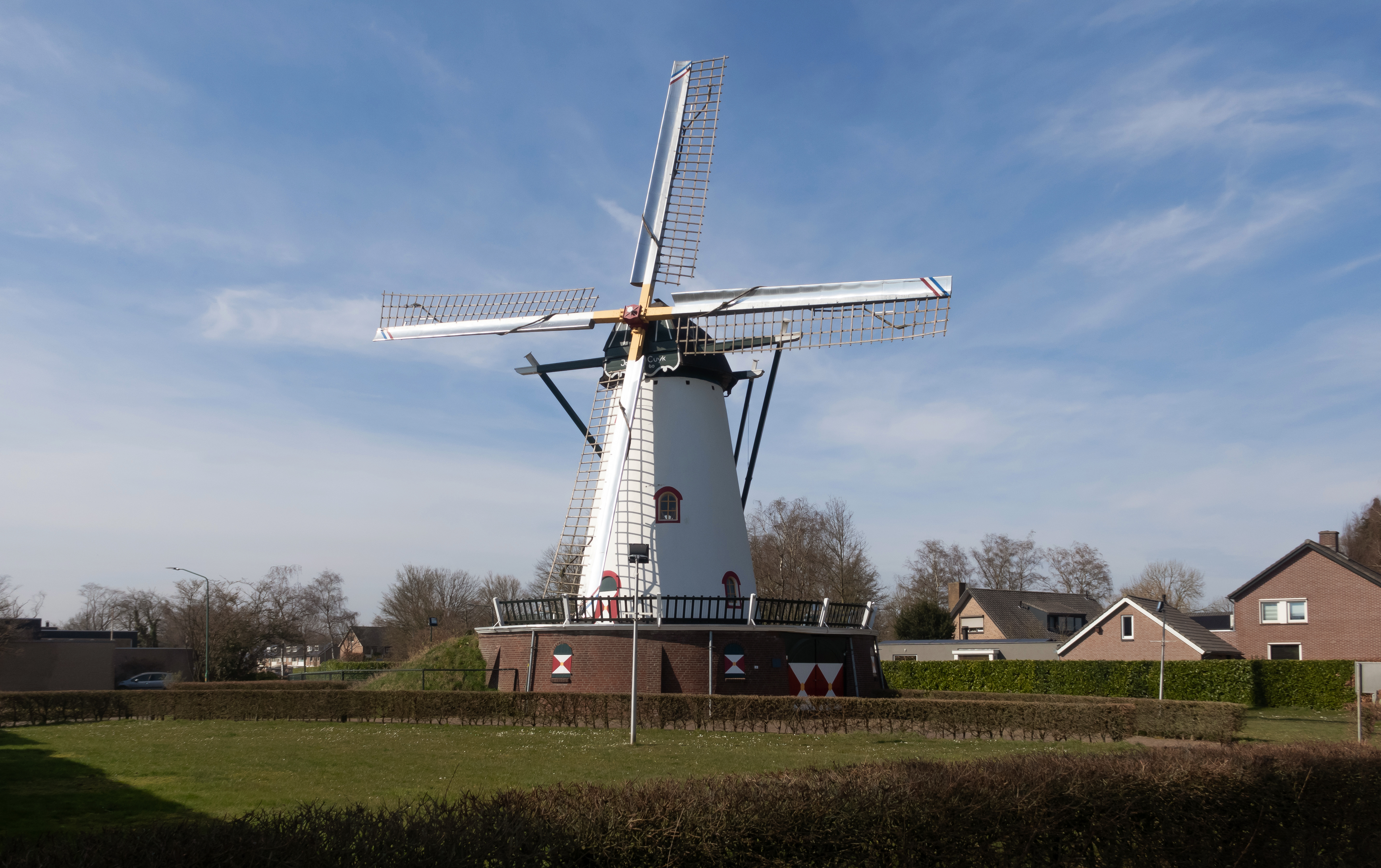
Cuijk, windmill: windmolen Jan van Cuijk

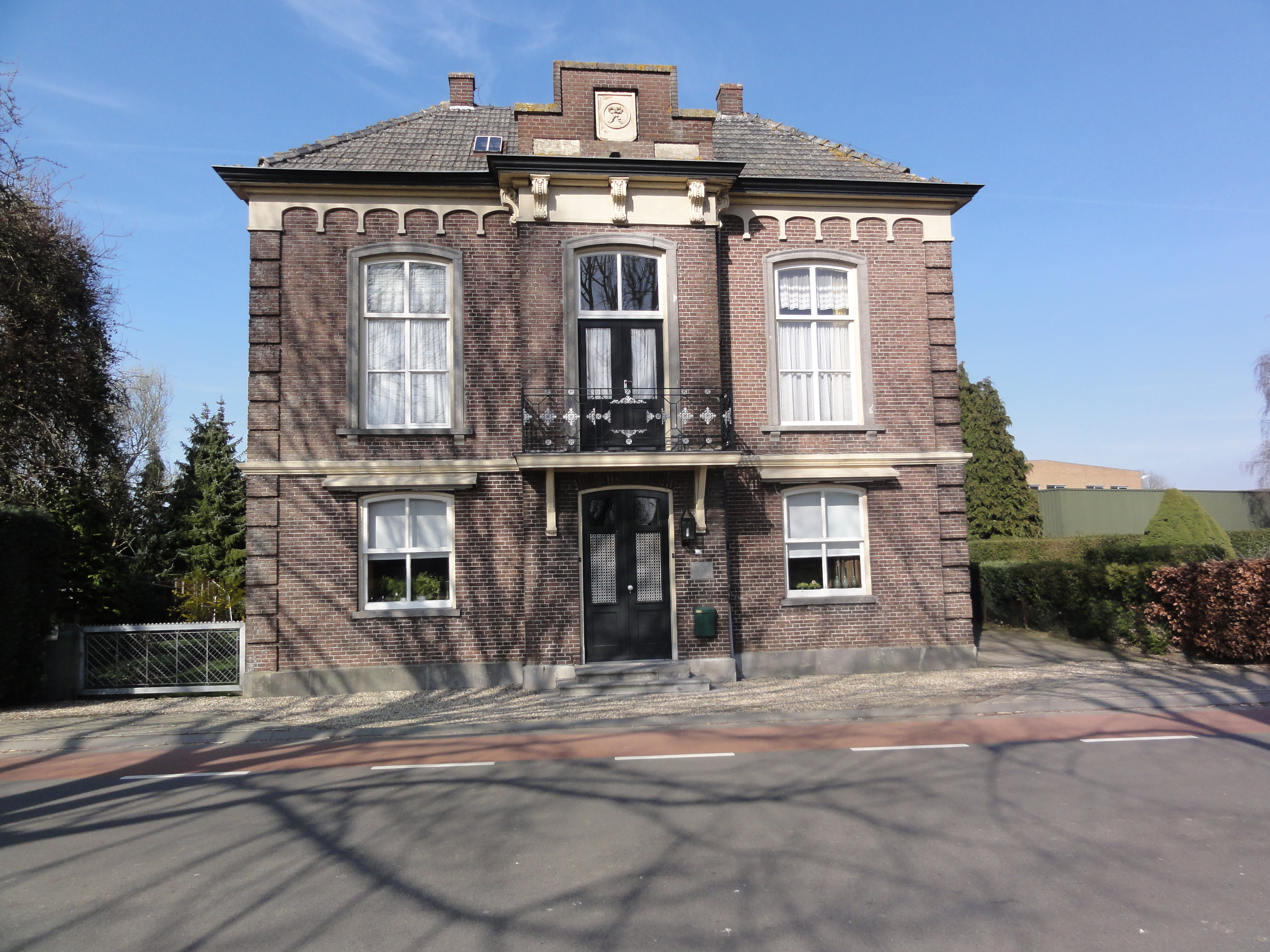
Former town hall, between Katwijk and Linden

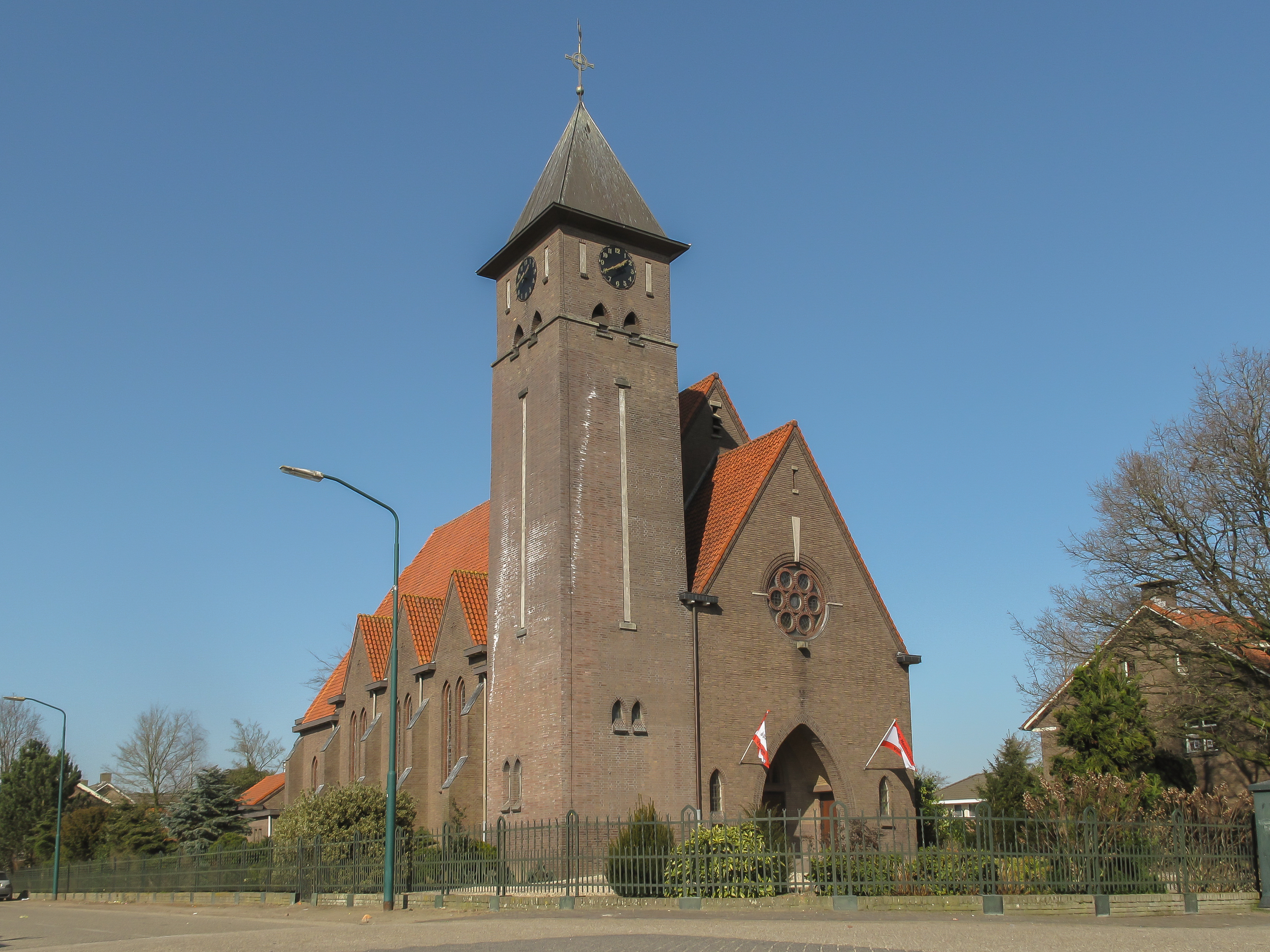
Vianen, church

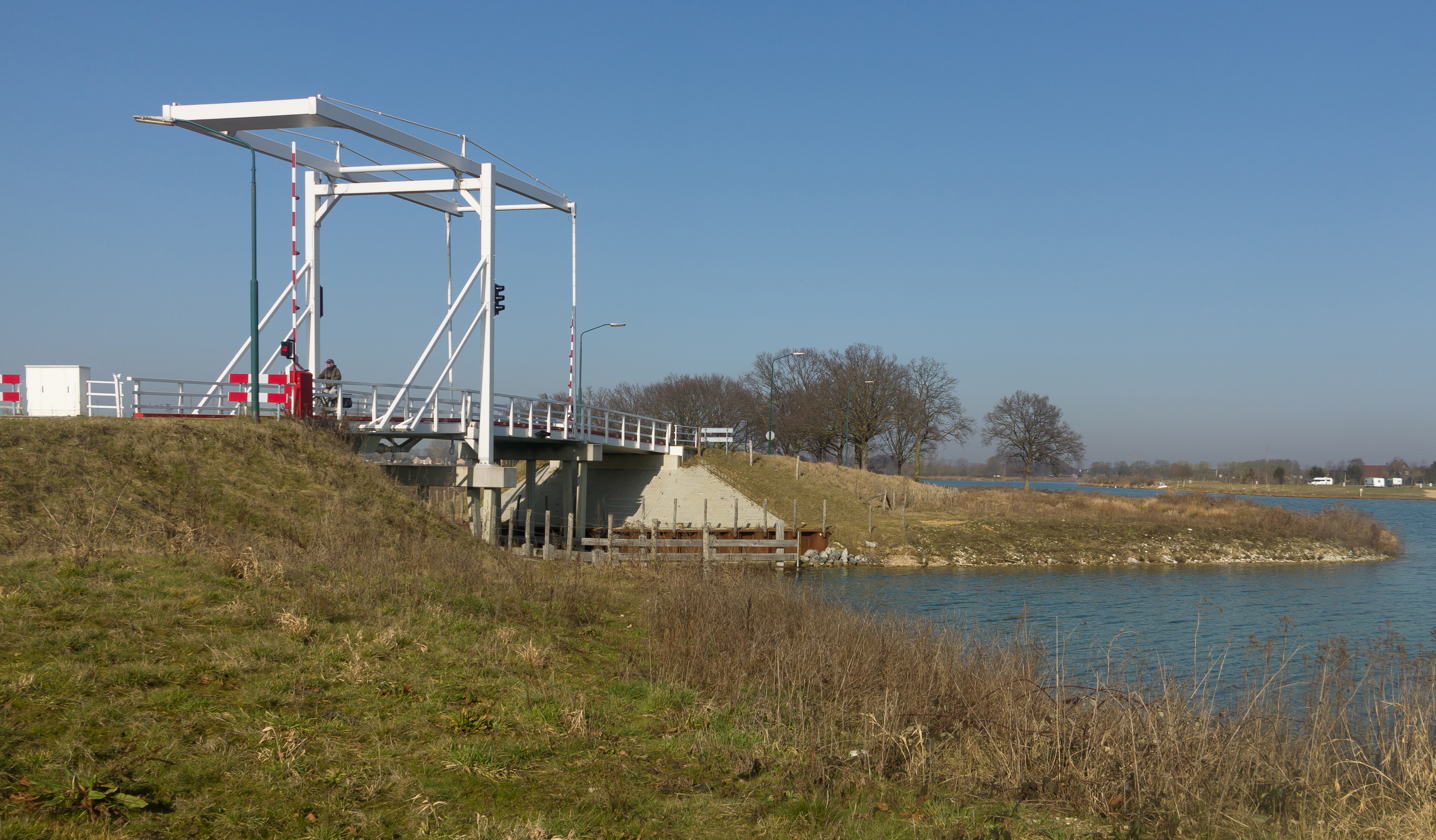
Kraaijenbergse Plassen, double-beam drawbridge
