= El Dorado Kitchen =

Coordinates: 38°17′37.36″N 122°27′32.28″W

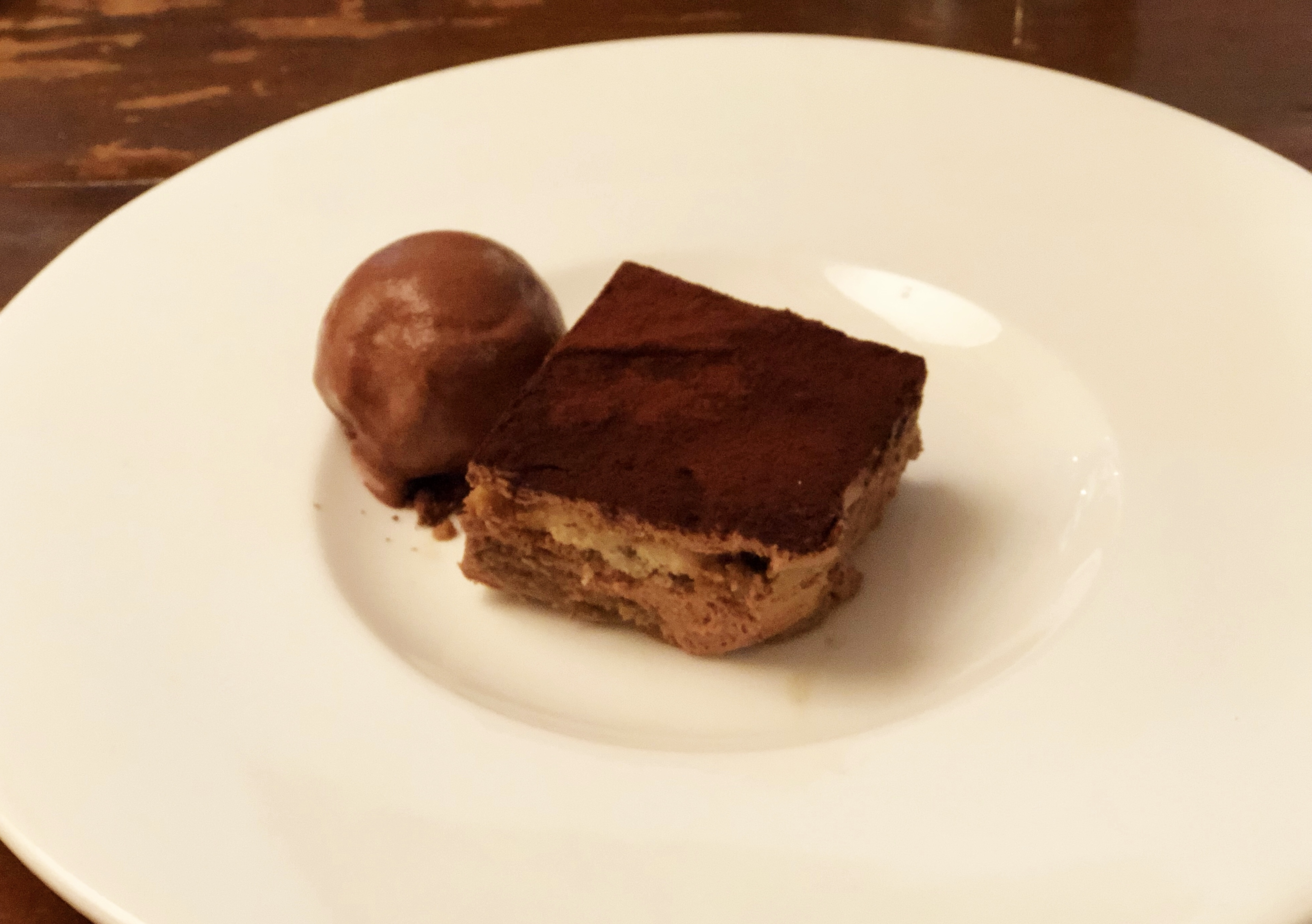
- Tiramisu (chocolate mousse, rum, chocolate sorbet) at El Dorado Kitchen, Sonoma, California
- Interactive map of El Dorado Kitchen

Restaurant information
- Established: 2005
- Owner: Moana Restaurant Group
- Head chef: Armando Navarro
- Food type: Californian cuisine
- Dress code: Casual
- Rating: AAA Motor Club; Zagat 4.3/5
- Location: 405 1st Street West, Sonoma, Sonoma, California, 95476, USA
- Seating capacity: 226
- Reservations: Yes
- Website: eldoradokitchen.com

El Dorado Kitchen (also called EDK) is a restaurant and bar located in Sonoma, California in the United States. It is located on the property of the El Dorado Inn in downtown Sonoma.

== Background ==
El Dorado Kitchen opened in 2005. It took over the location of the Sonoma location of Piatti. Ryan Fancher left French Laundry to become the founding executive chef at EDK. He also served as owner of EDK alongside Tim Harmon.

Fancher left the restaurant to work at Barndiva in Healdsburg. Justin Everett was executive chef in 2010. In 2012, Armando Navarro was executive chef. Joel Hoachuck joined as General Manager in 2017.

The restaurant and bar are designed with earth tones. The furniture is made of dark wood. There is a large communal table in the middle of the main dining room. The table is made of a single piece of tree trunk that was used in a bridge in Vermont. An open kitchen is connected to the main dining room. There is a dining patio outside connected to the hotel pool. The patio has cabanas which are available for dining.

== Cuisine ==
Michelin Guide describes EDK's food as California cuisine while Zagat's calls it "Cal-Med," combining California cuisine with Mediterranean cuisine. It uses seasonal local food. A house speciality are french fries with truffle oil. EDK also makes its own charcuterie. Appetizers may include fried green tomatoes, caesar salad served with olives, and prosciutto and Vermont cheddar served with a cup of San Marzano tomato soup. Entrees include Alaskan halibut with asparagus, pea shoots, and pudding made of corn, Pacific salmon with cassoulet made of white bean, and lamb with polenta spiced with rosemary. They serve cheese using cheesemakers products from the West Coast of the United States. Desserts include rhubarb crumble.

The bar has its own bar menu that is different than the main menu. The bar serves cocktails made with seasonal ingredients. Drinks may include martinis made with green tea. It also serves craft beer. Most of the wines on the wine list are made by Sonoma and Napa winemakers, including many that are organic or biodynamic. The bar also serves mocktails.
