= Brabants =

Brabants is a surname. Notable people with the surname include:

- Jeanne Brabants (1920–2014), Belgian dancer and choreographer
- Tim Brabants (born 1977), British sprint kayaker

== See also ==
- Brabant (disambiguation)
