= Atlantic League (football) =

Proposed international association football competition

The Atlantic League is a proposed international association football competition to be played in a number of European countries. The aim of the Atlantic League to allow clubs who have been successful in their national competitions to participate in a more competitive league that would be more attractive to fans and television viewers, resulting in higher revenues and the ability to attract more talented players. An Atlantic League would aspire for itself and its clubs to achieve parity with the "Big Five" leagues, which are Europe's largest existing national leagues in England, Italy, Germany, Spain, and France.

== 2000–01 proposals ==
The first Atlantic League proposal was made by Peter Fossen and Harry van Raaij, chief executive officer and club president respectively at Dutch club PSV Eindhoven. Fearing that their club would be left behind in terms of financial revenue and ability to attract star players relative to those that play in the largest European national leagues, they contacted a number of other clubs, both in the Netherlands and abroad, with large fanbases, with the proposition that they secede from their existing league competitions and form an international competition with one another. A plan was drawn up for a league featuring clubs from the Netherlands, Belgium, Portugal and Scotland, plus a contingent from Scandinavian countries. Talks were held with Ajax, Feyenoord, Porto, Rangers and Celtic; Celtic were particularly receptive of the idea. The league was planned to begin in 2002 at the earliest, following the conclusion of television rights contracts in the affected countries.

By 2001, Fossen had abandoned a parallel idea of setting up a completely Europe-wide league competition (the Euroleague) – he had forwarded this idea through the influential G-14 group of clubs, of which PSV was a member, but was forced to relent following opposition from clubs in the largest national leagues like England and Germany. He instead furthered his Atlantic League proposal, entering into discussions with UEFA's marketing director Lars-Christer Olsson with a project that now included the other Dutch and Scottish clubs contacted in the initial stage, plus S.L. Benfica and Sporting C.P. from Portugal's Liga Sagres, R.S.C. Anderlecht and Club Brugge K.V. from Belgium's Jupiler League, IFK Göteborg and AIK from Sweden's Allsvenskan, and Brøndby IF and F.C. Copenhagen from Denmark's SAS Ligaen. A system of promotion and relegation would be maintained, with the least successful clubs relegated back to their national top leagues to be replaced by that league's champions. Qualification for the existing European club competitions (the UEFA Champions League and UEFA Cup) would be available through the league.

With a target population of over 40 million in Atlantic League represented countries, and with a proposed average attendance of over 30,000, which would be the third largest of all European leagues, van Raaij hoped to secure a television contract comparable to that of the larger leagues. The Scottish Premier League (SPL) were actively involved in the negotiations, but other domestic leagues affected offered lucrative deals to clubs to remain in their national setup.

UEFA chief executive Gerhard Aigner accepted the need for action in preventing the disparity between the largest clubs and the would-be Atlantic League participants, but during a two-day summit in Nyon, Switzerland in February 2001, ultimately rejected the proposal. He instead proposed a revamp of the UEFA Cup competition to try to redress the balance. With meetings still on-going between the Atlantic League group that September, UEFA insisted that if they broke away from the governing body to set up the league, they would suffer from no longer being able to compete in Europe-wide competition such as the Champions League.

== 2002 proposals ==
By April 2002, Rangers and Celtic (collectively known as the Old Firm) were openly attempting to secede from the SPL and enter the English league system instead. van Raaij and PSV approached the pair with a new Atlantic League proposal, now featuring between 18 and 20 teams and no longer including the Scandinavian countries. Up to five places would have been awarded to Scottish clubs under the new proposal; significantly, this would allow clubs in the SPL other than the Old Firm to contest the competition. This development came just as those clubs threatened to resign from the league in protest at the dominance of the Old Firm. The new Atlantic League would again maintain promotion and relegation with the national top leagues and facilitate qualification for Europe-wide competition.

== North Atlantic League Cup ==
In the autumn of 2003, representatives of the Dutch, Belgian, Danish and Scottish leagues proposed an alternative competition called the North Atlantic League Cup. It would feature the top four clubs from each of the four leagues in a round-robin group stage followed by a knockout tournament each January, although those still competing in the Champions League or UEFA Cup would be exempt from the competition. Celtic CEO Ian McLeod reassured UEFA that this competition would be complementary to, and not intended to replace, the existing national competitions, unlike the Atlantic League. UEFA replied that international competitions must take place under their jurisdiction, but were not opposed to the idea, only insisting that the national associations involved be in full agreement.

== 2008 resurrection ==
In December 2008, Rangers manager Walter Smith admitted he would like to see his club competing in the Atlantic League, with a reserve team continuing to compete in the SPL – opining that the financial domination of the largest leagues has cheapened the appeal of the Champions League, as top clubs are able to field weakened teams and still able to qualify easily. The SPL remained open to the idea, but refused to enter into any negotiations until its existing television rights deal concludes in 2014. Scandinavian clubs were included again in media speculation over interested clubs, this time including Rosenborg BK from Norway's Tippeligaen. UEFA are likely to oppose the proposals once more, citing fear of the proliferation of non-national leagues.

== 2016 resurrection ==
North Atlantic League (estimation)
- Country: Belgium; Denmark; Finland; Netherlands; Norway; Scotland; Sweden
- Confederation: UEFA
- Number of clubs: 16; RSC Anderlecht; Club Brugge KV; KAA Gent; Standard Liège; Brøndby IF; FC Copenhagen; HJK Helsinki; AFC Ajax; AZ Alkmaar; Feyenoord; PSV Eindhoven; Rosenborg BK; Celtic FC; Rangers FC; AIK Fotboll; Malmö FF
- International cup(s): UEFA Champions League; UEFA Europa League

The plan was again discussed in the beginning of 2016 and talks have taken place throughout the year by representatives from the Netherlands, Belgium, Scotland, Sweden, Denmark and Norway according to Anders Hørsholt, the director of F.C. Copenhagen. Representatives of F.C. Copenhagen (Denmark), Ajax (The Netherlands), PSV (The Netherlands), Feyenoord (The Netherlands), Anderlecht (Belgium), Club Brugge (Belgium) Celtic (Scotland), Rangers (Scotland), Malmö FF (Sweden), Rosenborg (Norway) and HJK Helsinki (Finland) are believed to have taken part in the discussions.

According to Toon Gerbrands (general director PSV) in 2016, the talks were just in the initial stage. He also claimed that the purpose of the discussions was to put UEFA under pressure.

== 2020–21 proposal ==
The chairman of Irish club Shelbourne F.C., Andrew Doyle, proposed a league involving Irish, Scottish and Scandinavian teams. The idea was given the go ahead by UEFA chairman Aleksandr Ceferin and had the backing of investment bank JP Morgan. According to the Daily Record (Scotland) the league would have an estimated income of £350 million. However, this proposal too failed to move forward as chairman of Scottish club Celtic F.C., Dermot Desmond declined to participate.

The chief executive of the Norwegian Premier League, Leif Overland, said "From what I have learned, it seems JP Morgan are involved in the investment and with good financing like that, the proposal must be taken seriously. But I think it's unlikely to be a good audience project because of the teams involved and the biggest challenge would be finding room in the football calendar."

== See also ==
- Royal League – short-lived competition between Scandinavian teams
- Baltic League – similar competition between Baltic teams
- Proposals for a European Super League in association football
