= Haps =

- Village
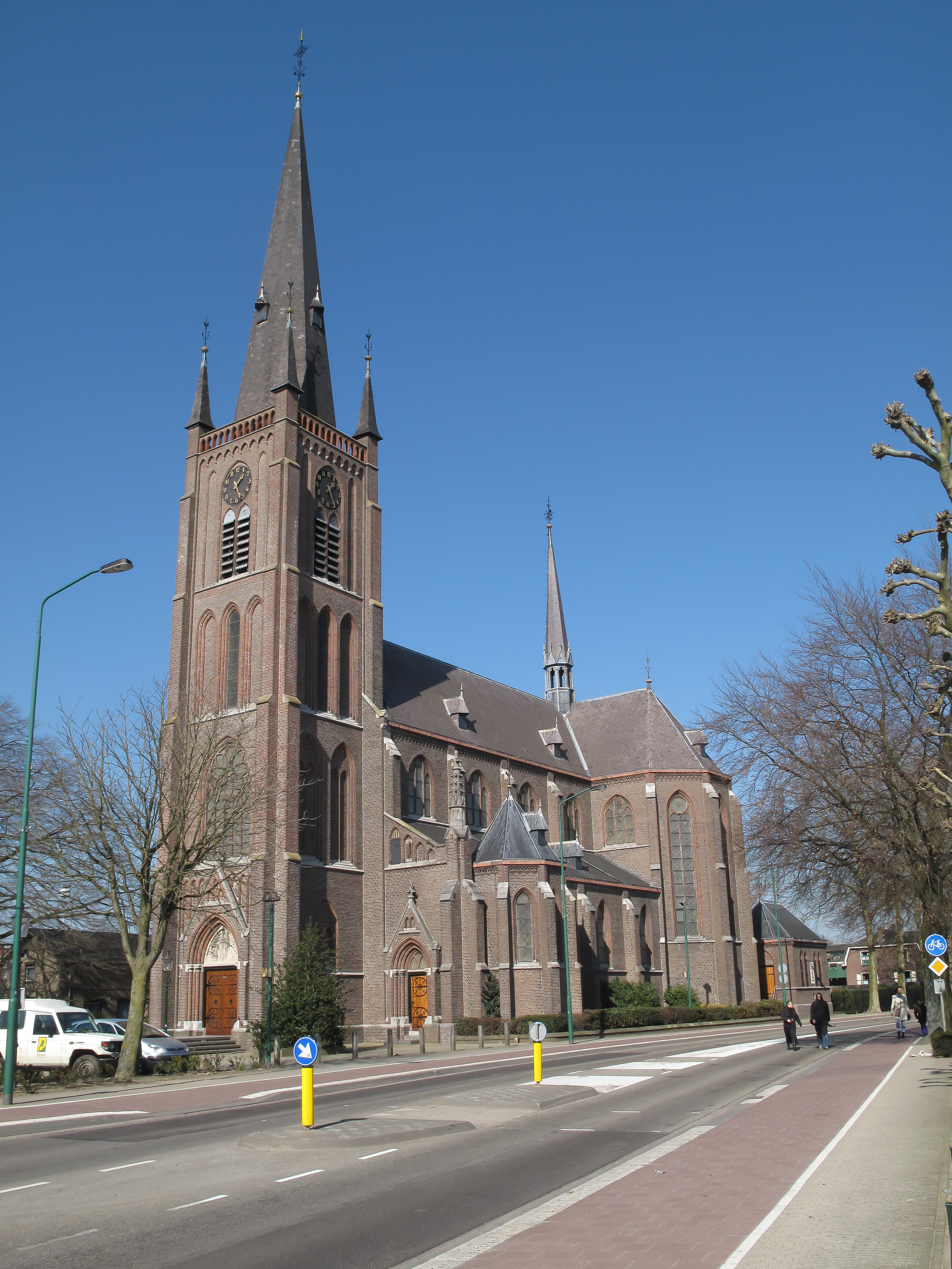
- Church of Haps

- Coat of arms

- Location in the province of North Brabant in the Netherlands Haps (Netherlands)
- Coordinates: 51°41′19″N 5°51′39″E
- Country: Netherlands
- Province: North Brabant
- Municipality: Land van Cuijk

Area
  - Total: 15.27 km^{2} (5.90 sq mi)
- Elevation: 12 m (39 ft)

Population (2021)
  - Total: 2,860
  - Density: 187/km^{2} (485/sq mi)
- Time zone: UTC+1 (CET)
  - Summer (DST): UTC+2 (CEST)
- Postal code: 5443
- Dialing code: 0485

Haps is a village in the Dutch province of North Brabant. It is located in the former municipality of Cuijk, about 5 kilometres (3.1 mi) south of the town of Cuijk. Since 2022 it has been part of the new municipality of Land van Cuijk.

== History ==
The village was first mentioned in 1201 as Hops. The etymology is unknown. Haps is a village in brook valley and was first mentioned in 1301. It used to be a heerlijkheid belonging to Boxmeer.

The Catholic St Nicolas Church was built in 1899 in Gothic Revival style. Above the middle entrance is a relief from the medieval church which was demolished in 1814. The grist mill Mariamolen was built in 1802. It was moved to its current location in 1859 and enlarged. In 1969, it was sold to the municipality and restored in 1972. It is occasionally in service.

Haps was home to 680 people in 1840. In 1873, a railway station opened on the railway line from Boxtel to Wesel. The station closed in 1944, and the building was demolished in 1990. Haps was a separate municipality until 1994, when it became a part of Cuijk. In 2022, it became part of the municipality Land van Cuijk.

== Gallery ==
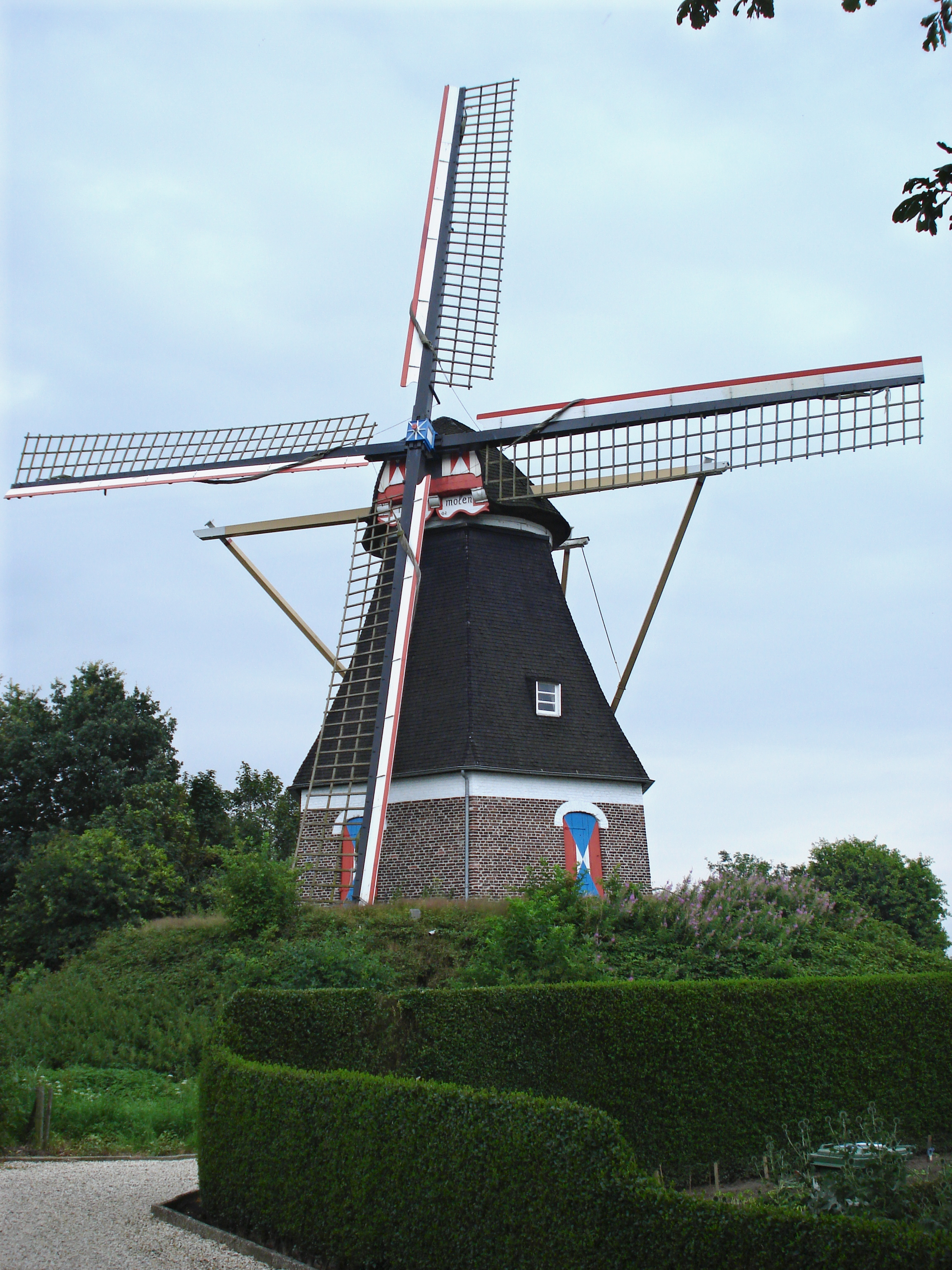
Wind mill Mariamolen

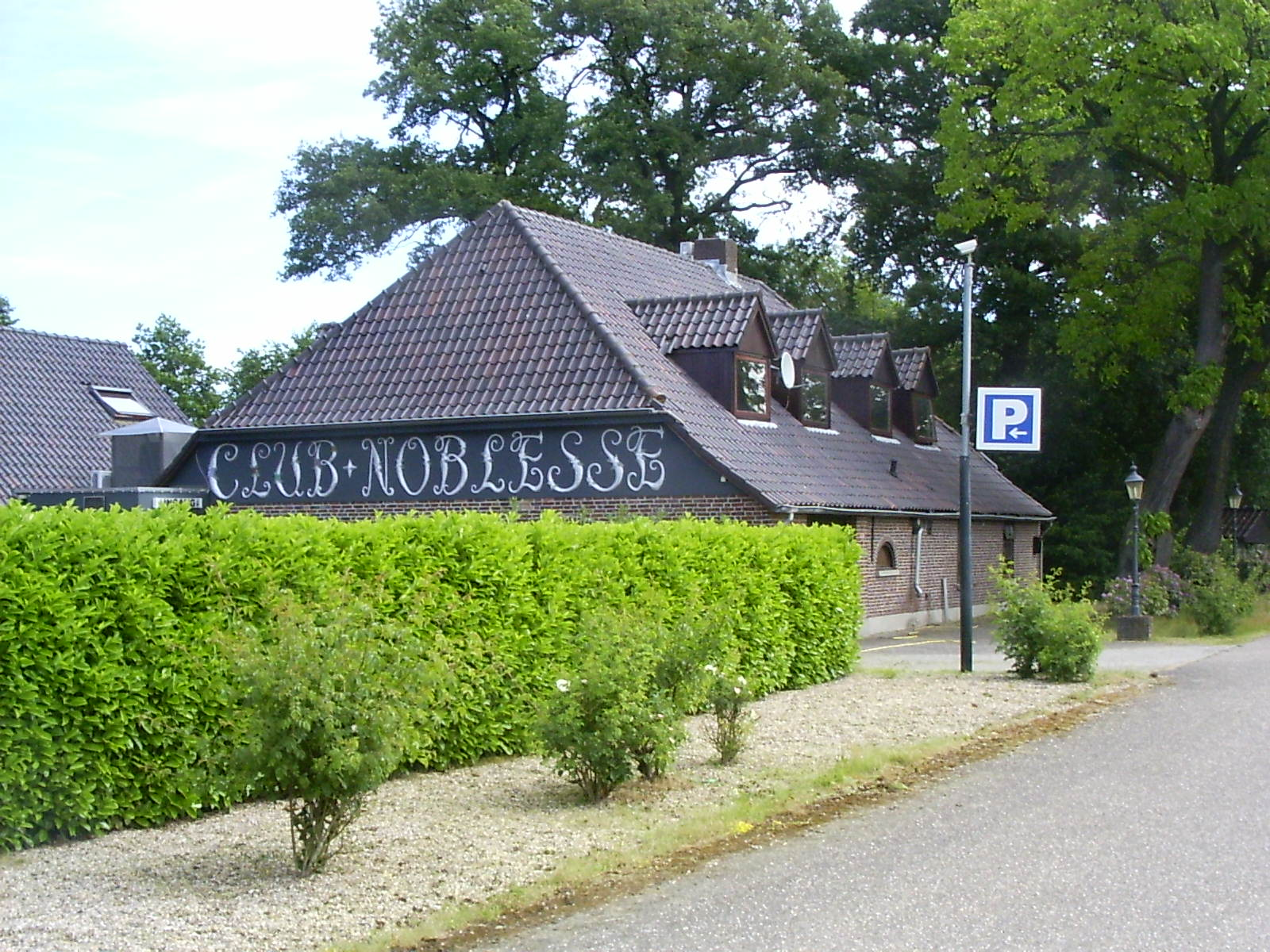
Brothel in Haps

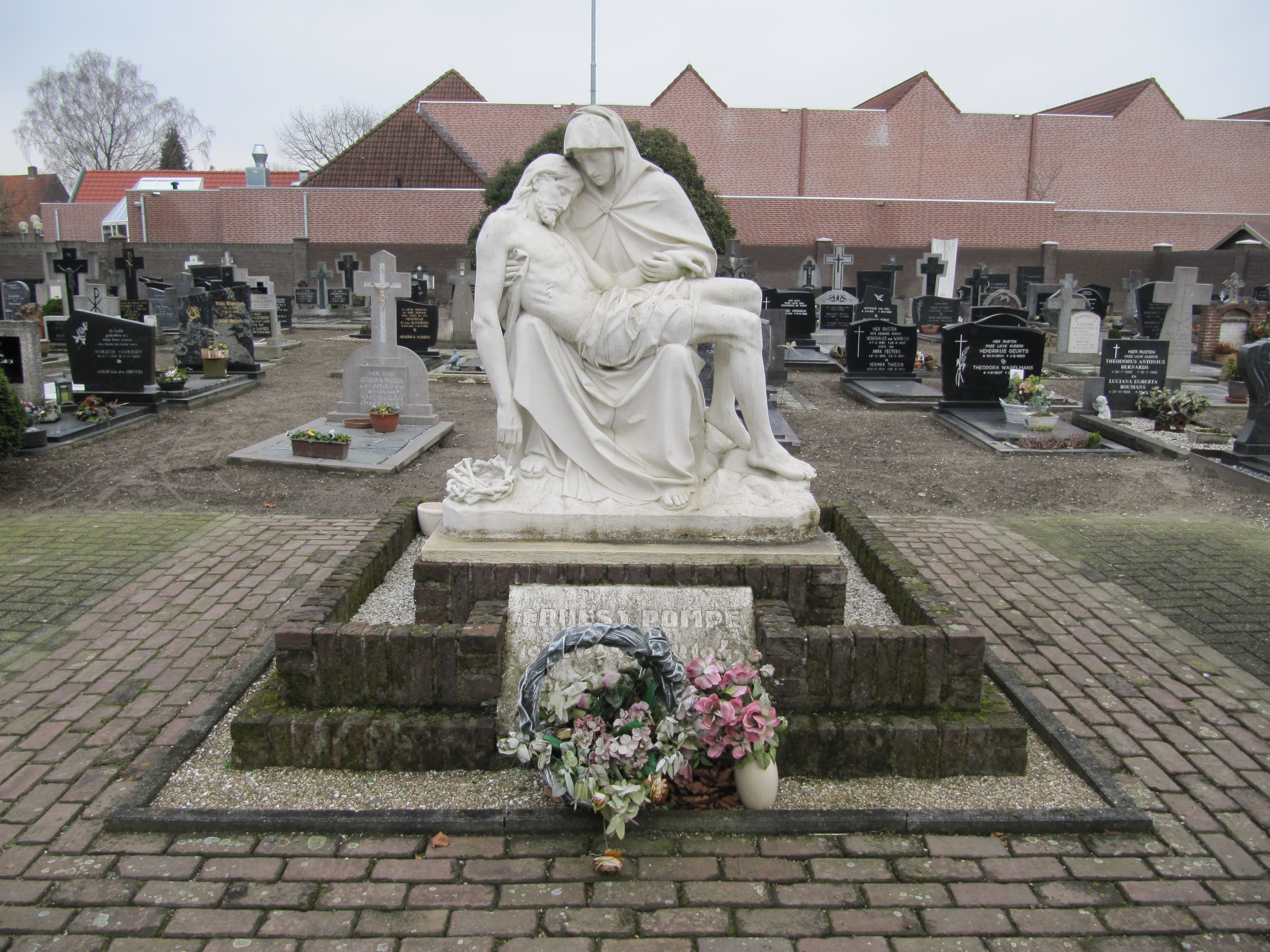
Pietà statue on the cemetery

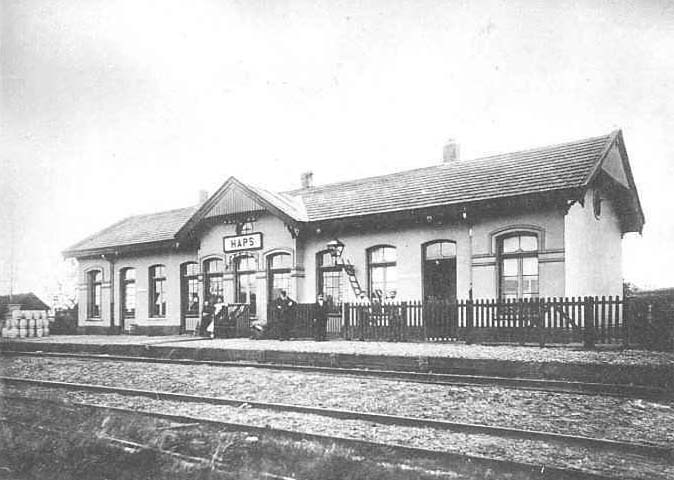
Former railway station Haps
