= Land van Cuijk =

- Municipality
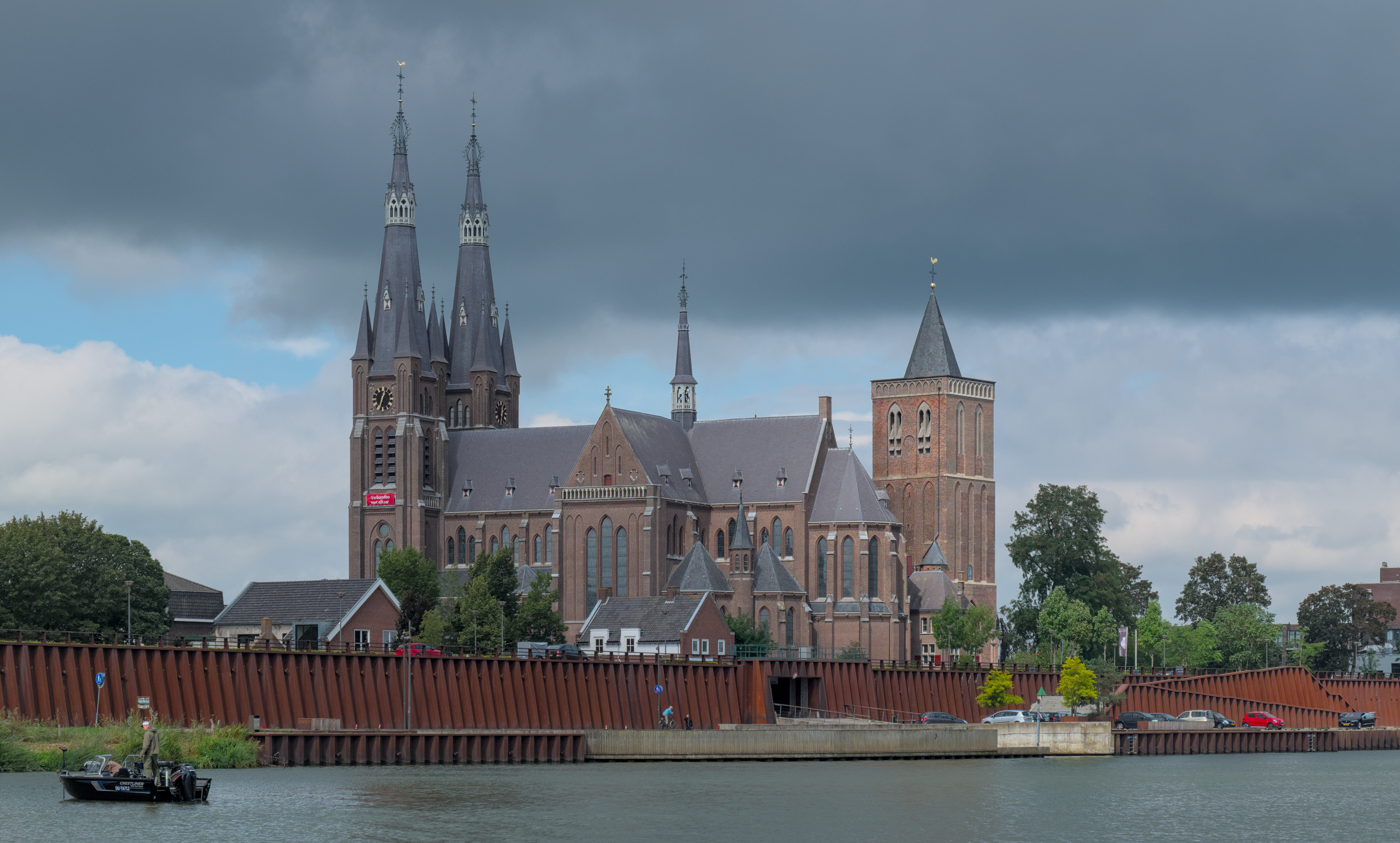
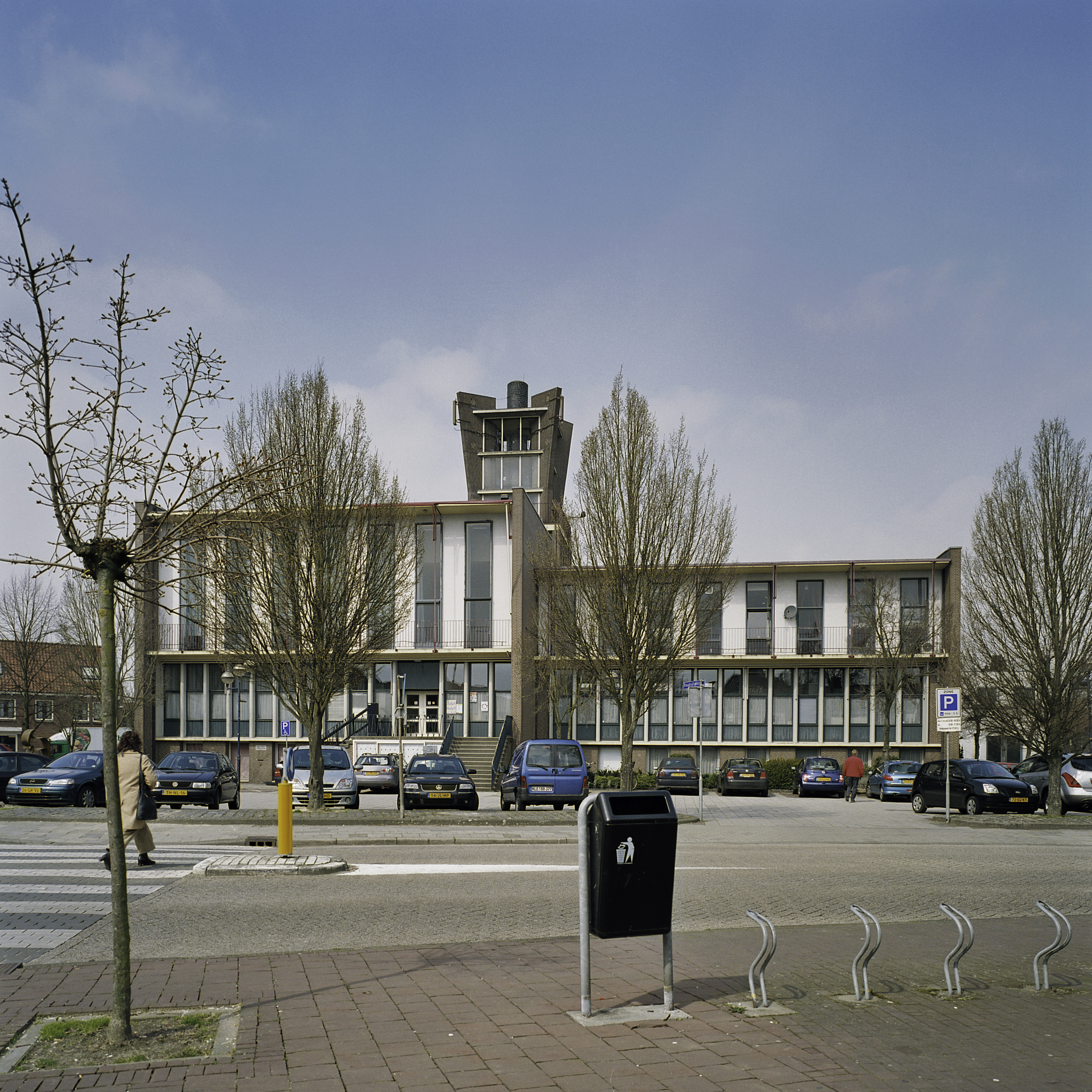
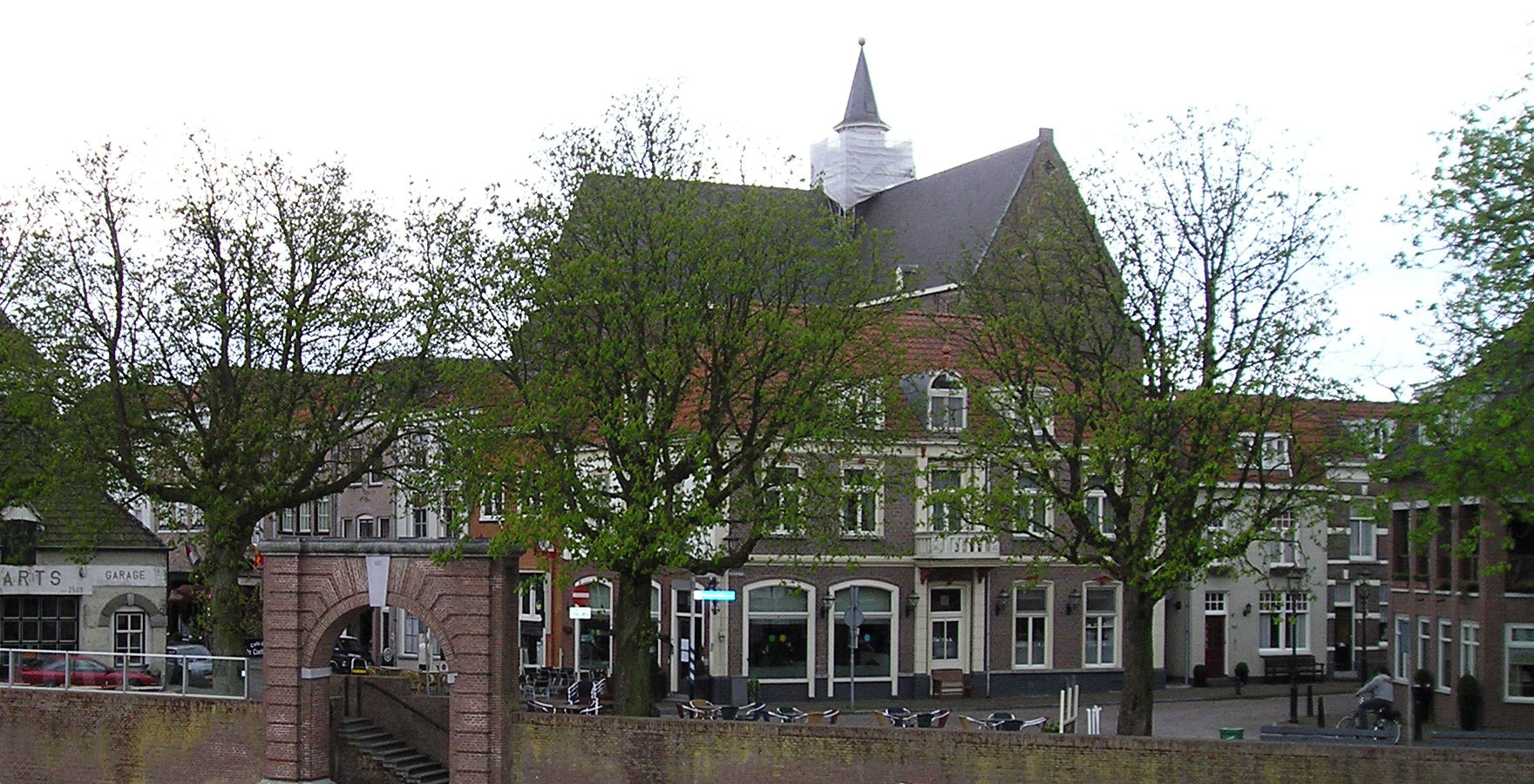
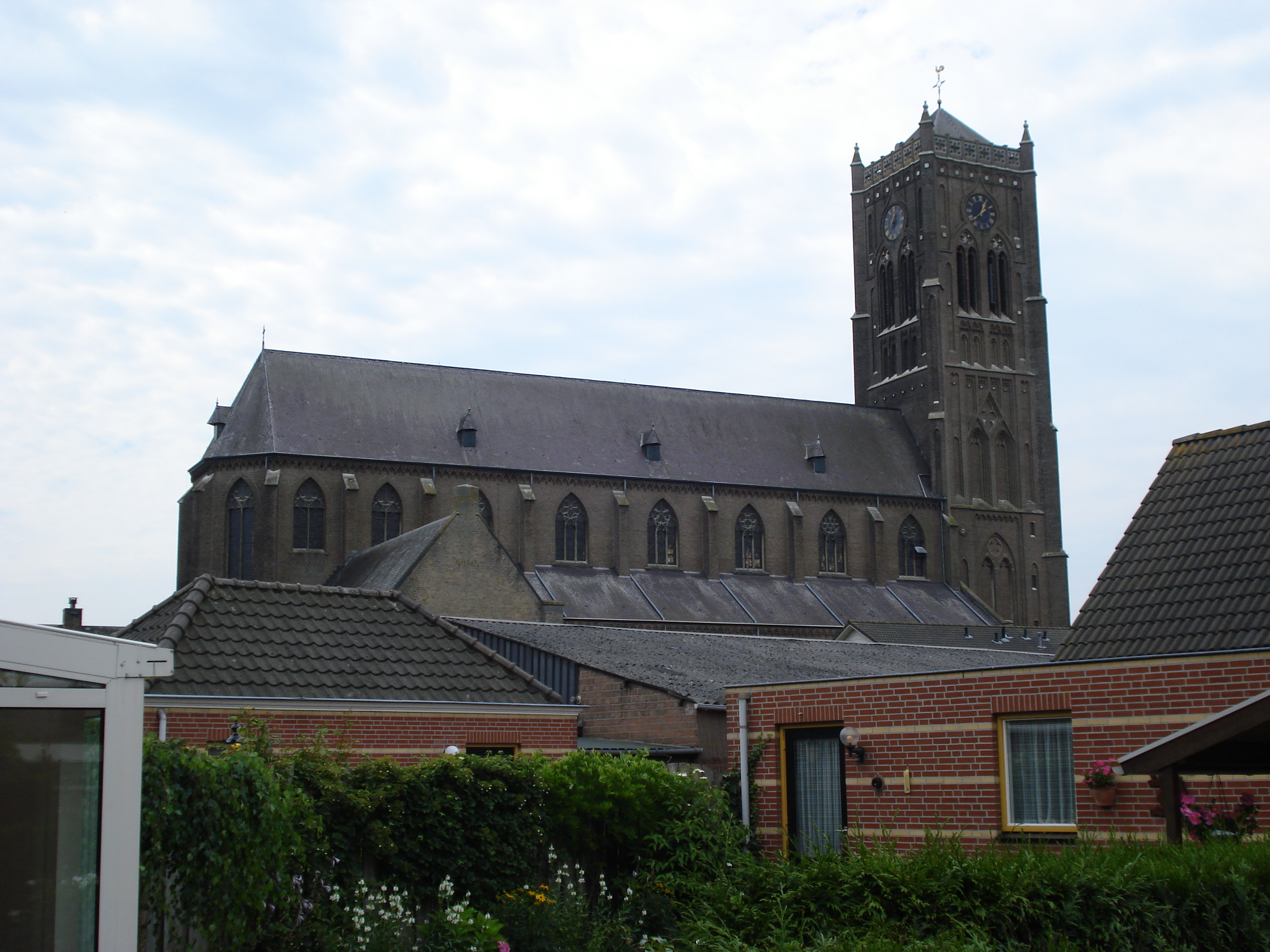
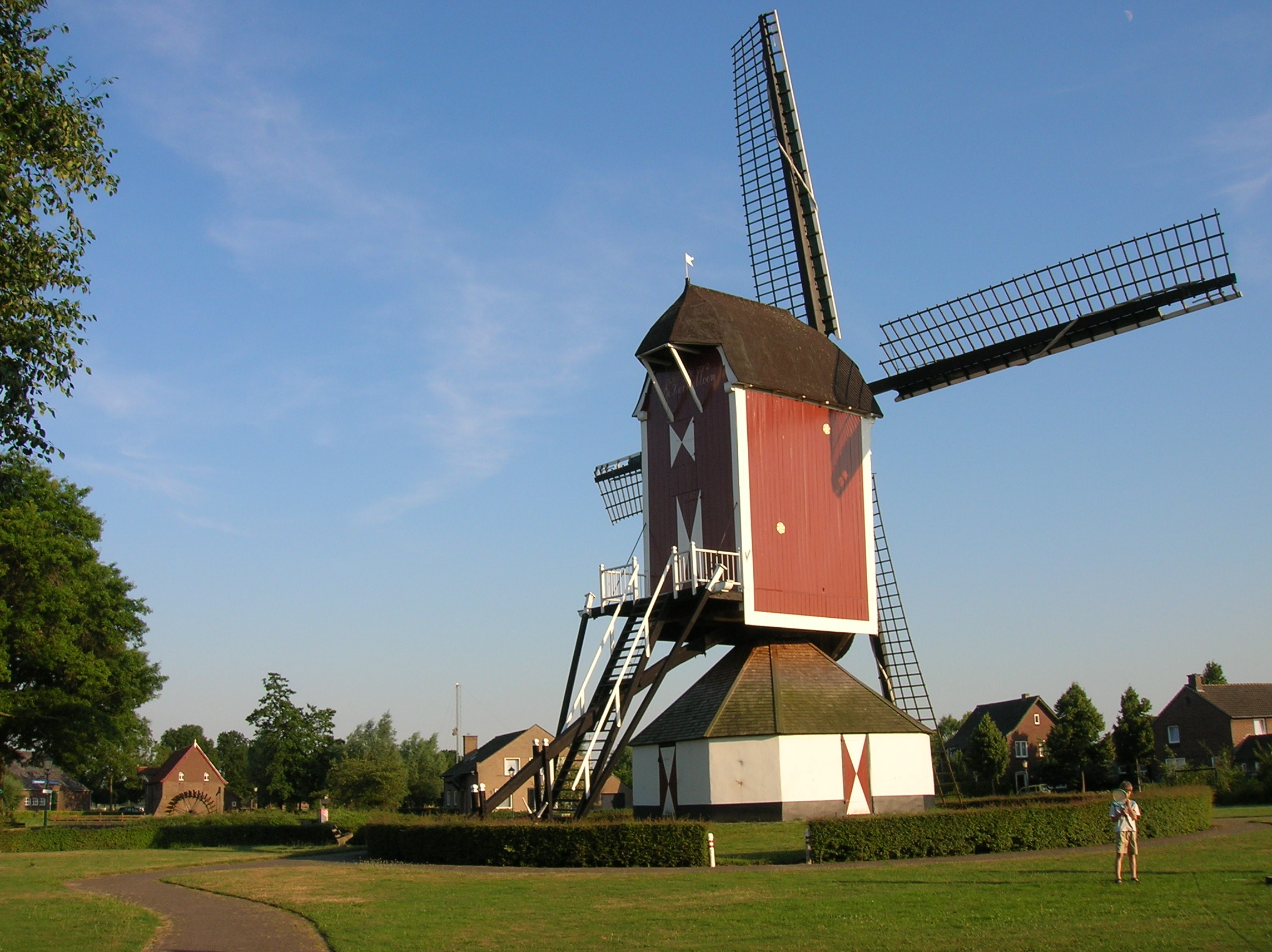
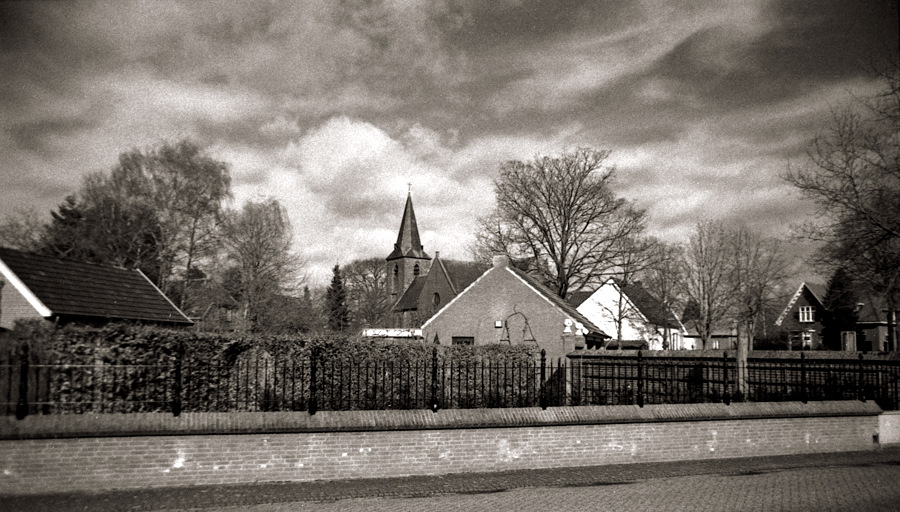
- Cuijk Boxmeer Grave Mill Sint Anthonis Sint Hubert

- Flag Coat of arms

- Location in North Brabant
- Country: Netherlands
- Province: North Brabant

Government
  - Body: Municipal council
  - Mayor: Marieke Moorman (CDA)

Area
  - Total: 351.87 km^{2} (135.86 sq mi)

Population (2022)
  - Total: 90,000
- Time zone: UTC+1 (CET)
  - Summer (DST): UTC+2 (CEST)
- Website: gemeentelandvancuijk.nl

Land van Cuijk is a municipality in the province of North Brabant, Netherlands, formed from the merger of Boxmeer, Cuijk, Sint Anthonis, Mill en Sint Hubert and Grave on 1 January 2022. It belongs to the region of De Peel.

The municipality is mainly oriented towards the city of Nijmegen. A Kleverland dialect is spoken in the entire Land van Cuijk.

== Geography ==
As of 2022, the areas encompassed by the municipality have a population of approximately 90 thousand people. The municipality is bordered by Wijchen and Heumen to the north, Mook en Middelaar, Gennep and Bergen (Limburg) to the east, Venray to the south and Oss, Maashorst, Boekel and Gemert-Bakel to the west. It consists of 33 main population centres.

== Topography ==

Dutch topographic map of the municipality of Land van Cuijk, 2021.

== History ==
The Land van Cuijk was given in pledge to William the Silent in 1559. During the Eighty Years' War, Grave was conquered in 1602 by Maurice of Nassau, later Prince of Orange. The Land van Cuijk remained in an uncertain position between the Spanish and the Dutch Netherlands until it joined the Dutch Republic at the Treaty of Münster in 1648. It was added to Staats-Brabant: a generality land that was administered from The Hague by the States General of the Republic.

The Catholic religion was suppressed (but tolerated) and the churches were taken over by the handful of Protestants who ruled. The Catholics were initially dependent on a border church in Oeffelt, in order to be allowed to move into a barn church on the Molenstraat after 1672.

After the foundation of the Batavian Republic in 1795, all lordships were abolished. The Land van Cuijk became part of Batavian Brabant.

== Name ==
The name Land van Cuijk refers to the former seigniory of the same name. The seigniory was bordered by the Maas and the Peel and consisted of two areas that were separated from each other by the seigniory of Boxmeer.

== Politics ==
The first elections for the municipality were held on 24 November 2021.
