= Mill en Sint Hubert =

- Former municipality
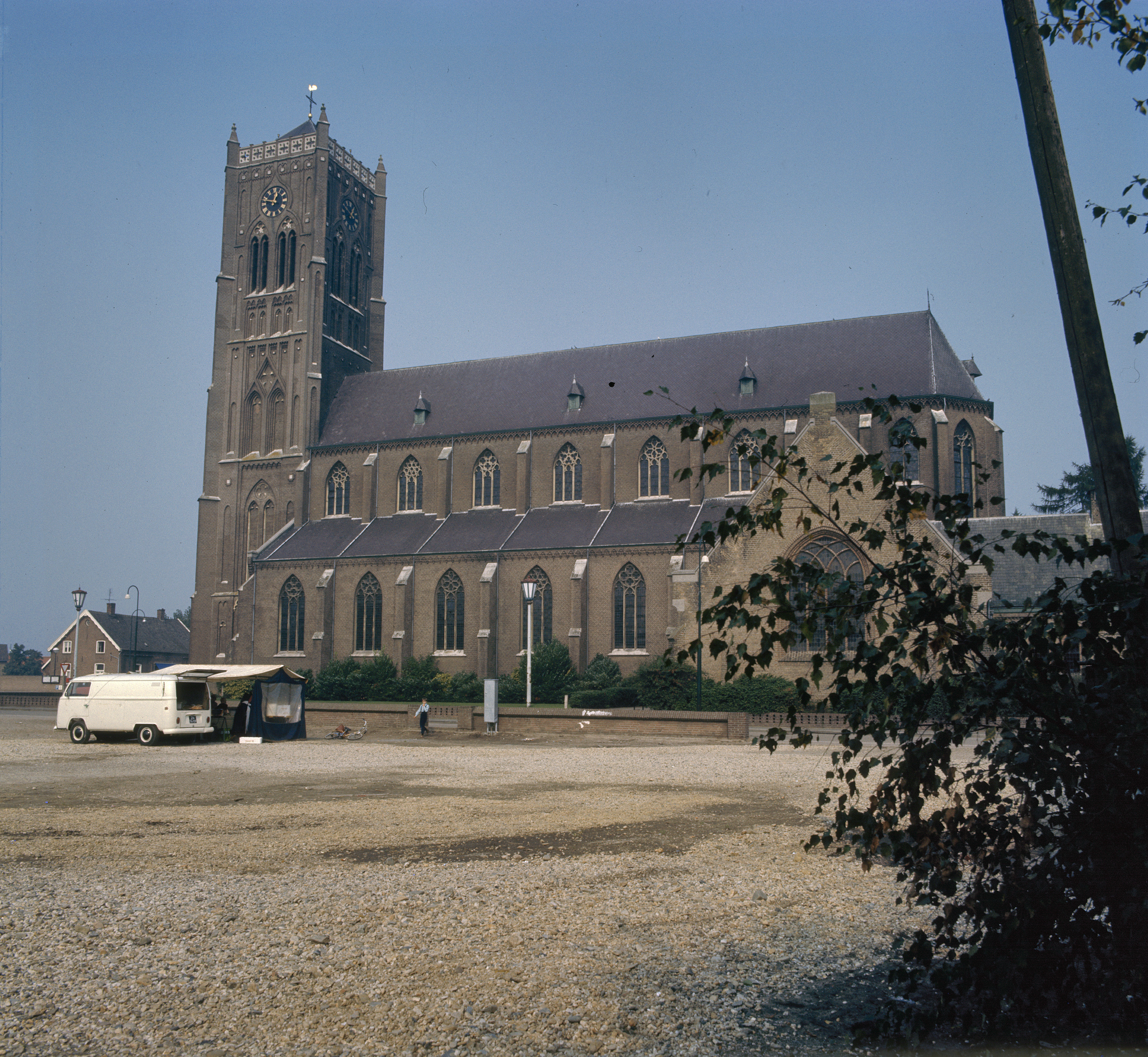
- Church in Mill

- Flag Coat of arms

- Location of the former municipality of Mill en Sint Hubert in North Brabant
- Coordinates: 51°41′N 5°47′E
- Country: Netherlands
- Province: North Brabant
- Municipality: Land van Cuijk

Area
  - Total: 53.17 km^{2} (20.53 sq mi)
  - Land: 52.23 km^{2} (20.17 sq mi)
  - Water: 0.94 km^{2} (0.36 sq mi)
- Elevation: 17 m (56 ft)

Population (January 2021)
  - Total: 11,004
  - Density: 211/km^{2} (550/sq mi)
- Time zone: UTC+1 (CET)
  - Summer (DST): UTC+2 (CEST)
- Postcode: 5450–5455
- Area code: 0485, 0486
- Website: www.gemeente-mill.nl

Mill en Sint Hubert (Dutch pronunciation: [ˈmɪl ɛn sɪnt ˈɦybərt]) is a former municipality in the province of North Brabant, the Netherlands.

Mill en Sint Hubert, Boxmeer, Cuijk, Grave, and Sint Anthonis merged into the new municipality of Land van Cuijk on 1 January 2022.

== Population centres ==
- Langenboom
- Mill
- Sint Hubert
- Wilbertoord

=== Topography ===
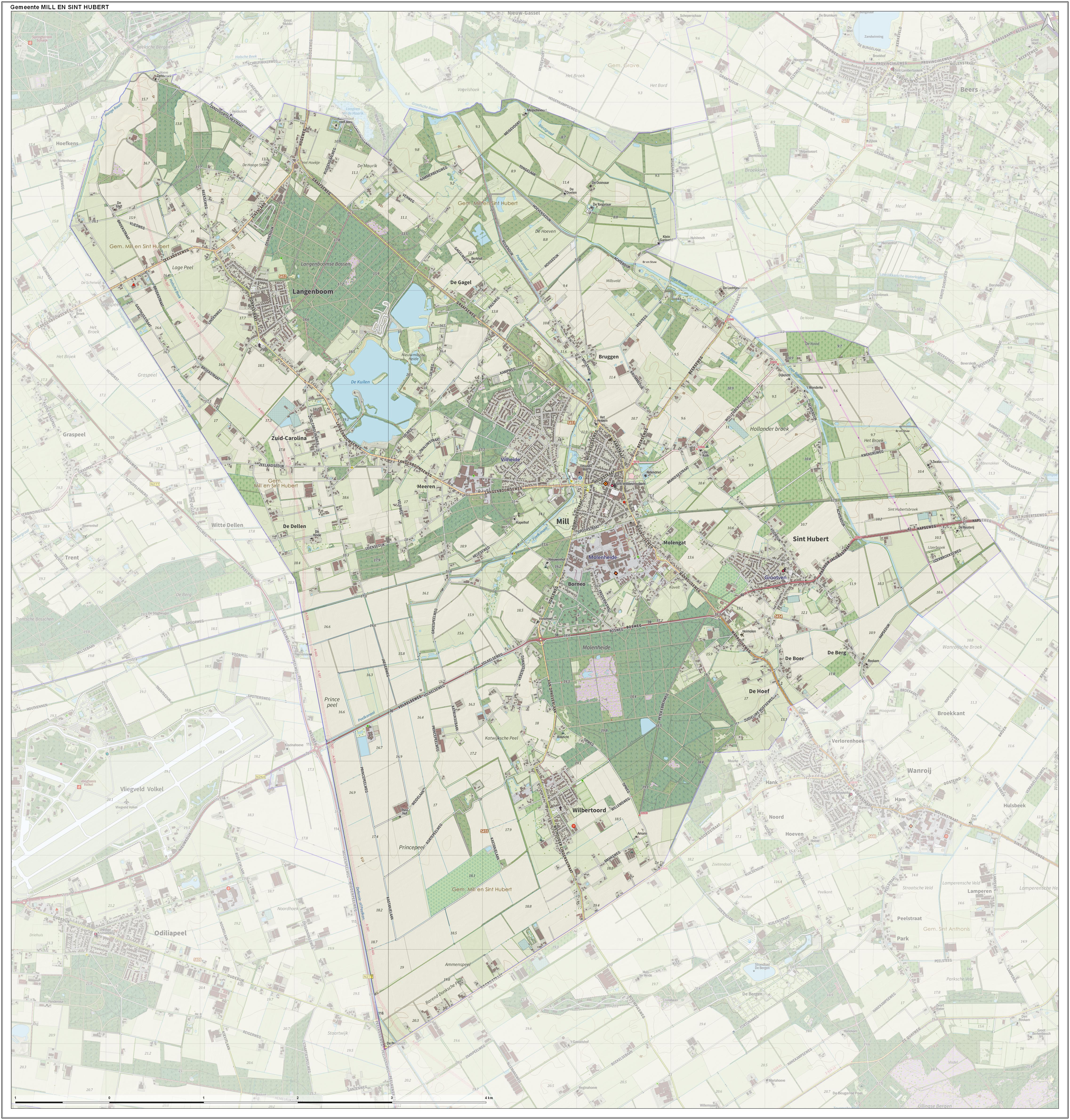

Map of the former municipality of Mill en Sint Hubert, 2015

== Notable people ==
- Kees Bastiaans (1909 in Mill - 1986 in Mill) a Dutch Expressionist painter
- Reinout Oerlemans (born 1971 in Mill) a Dutch soap opera actor, film director, TV presenter and producer
- Jochen Miller (born 1979 in Langenboom) a trance musician and progressive house DJ
- Janneke van Tienen (born 1979 in Mill) a volleyball player

== Image gallery ==
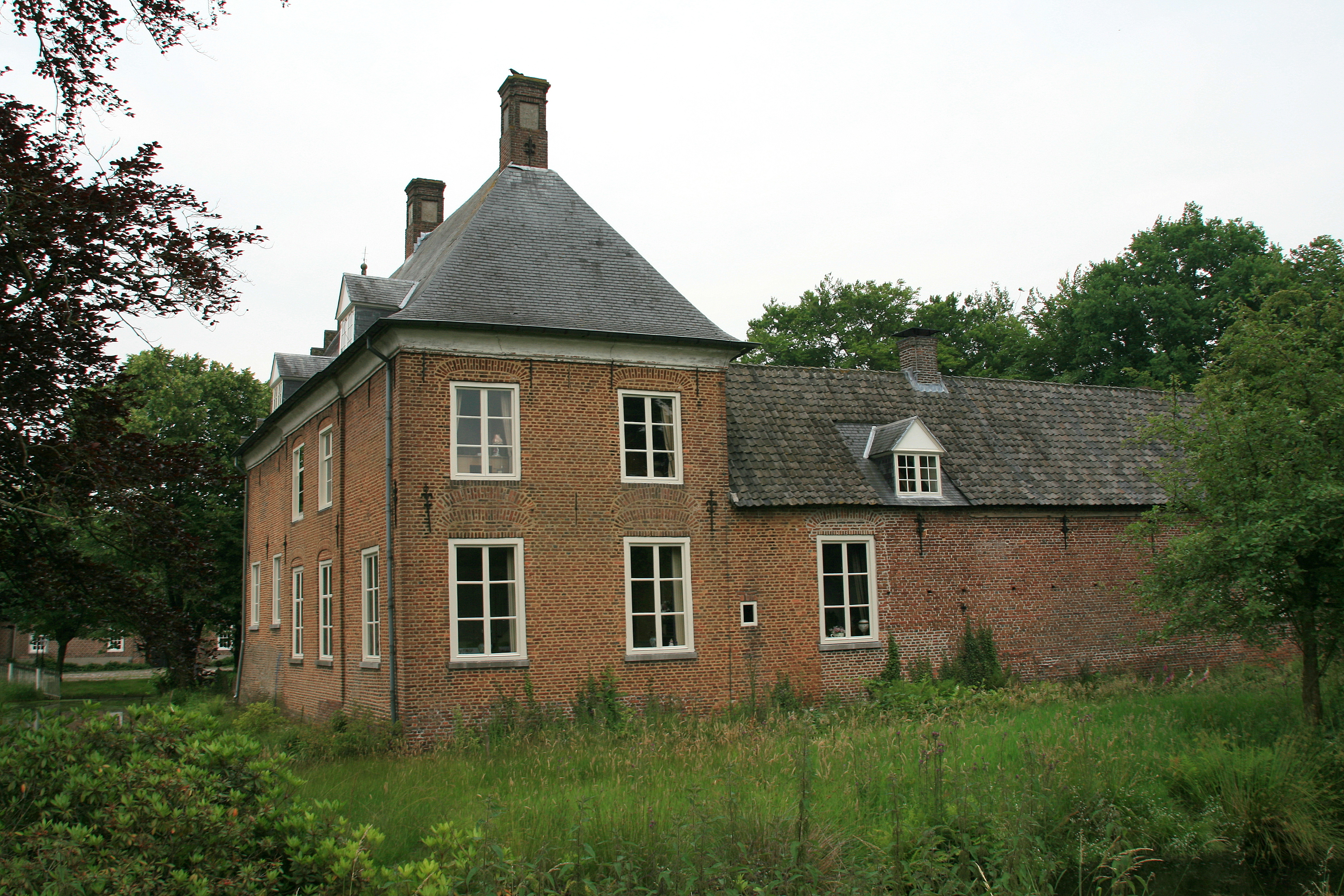
Aldendriel Castle

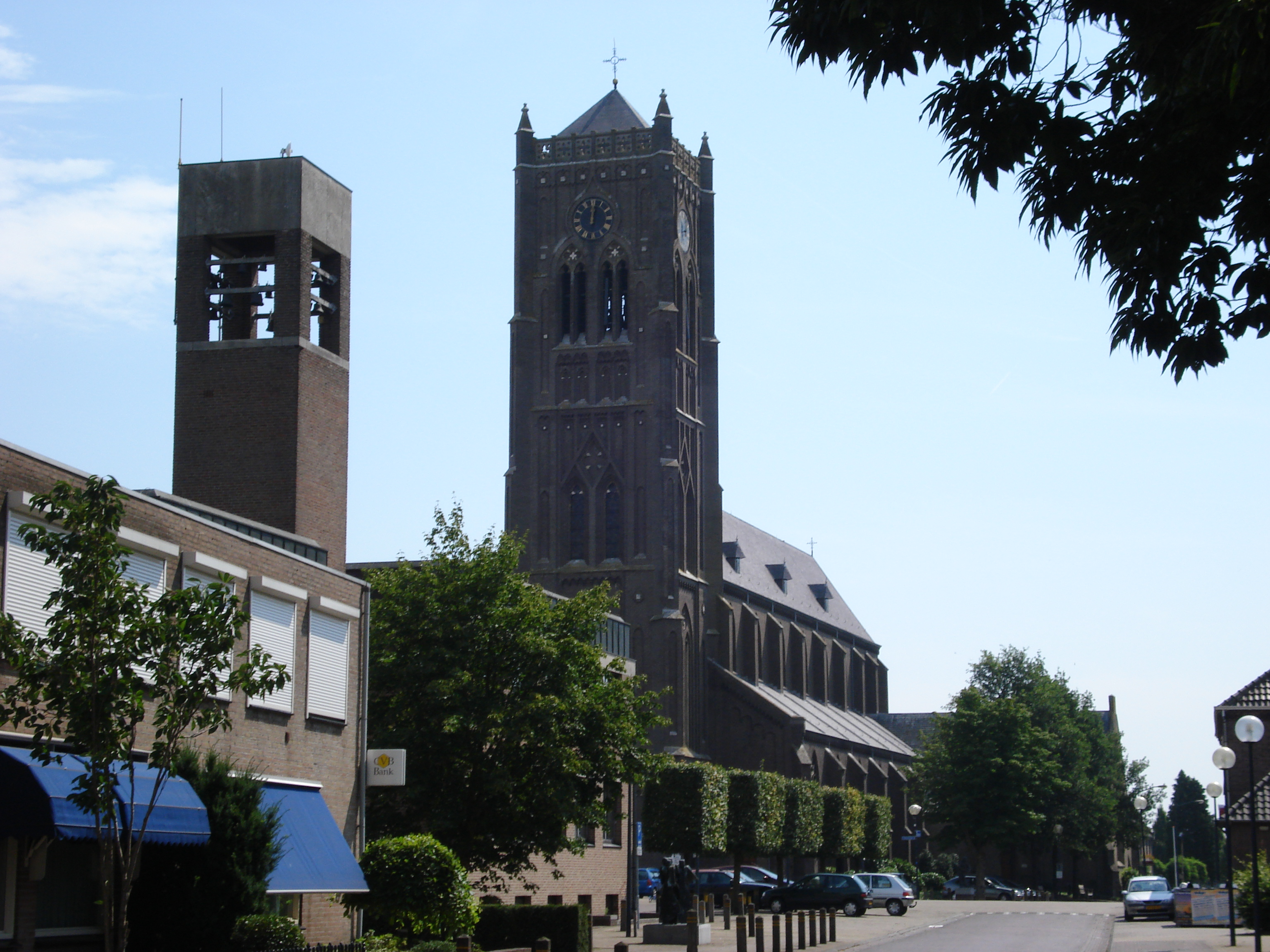
Church of Mill

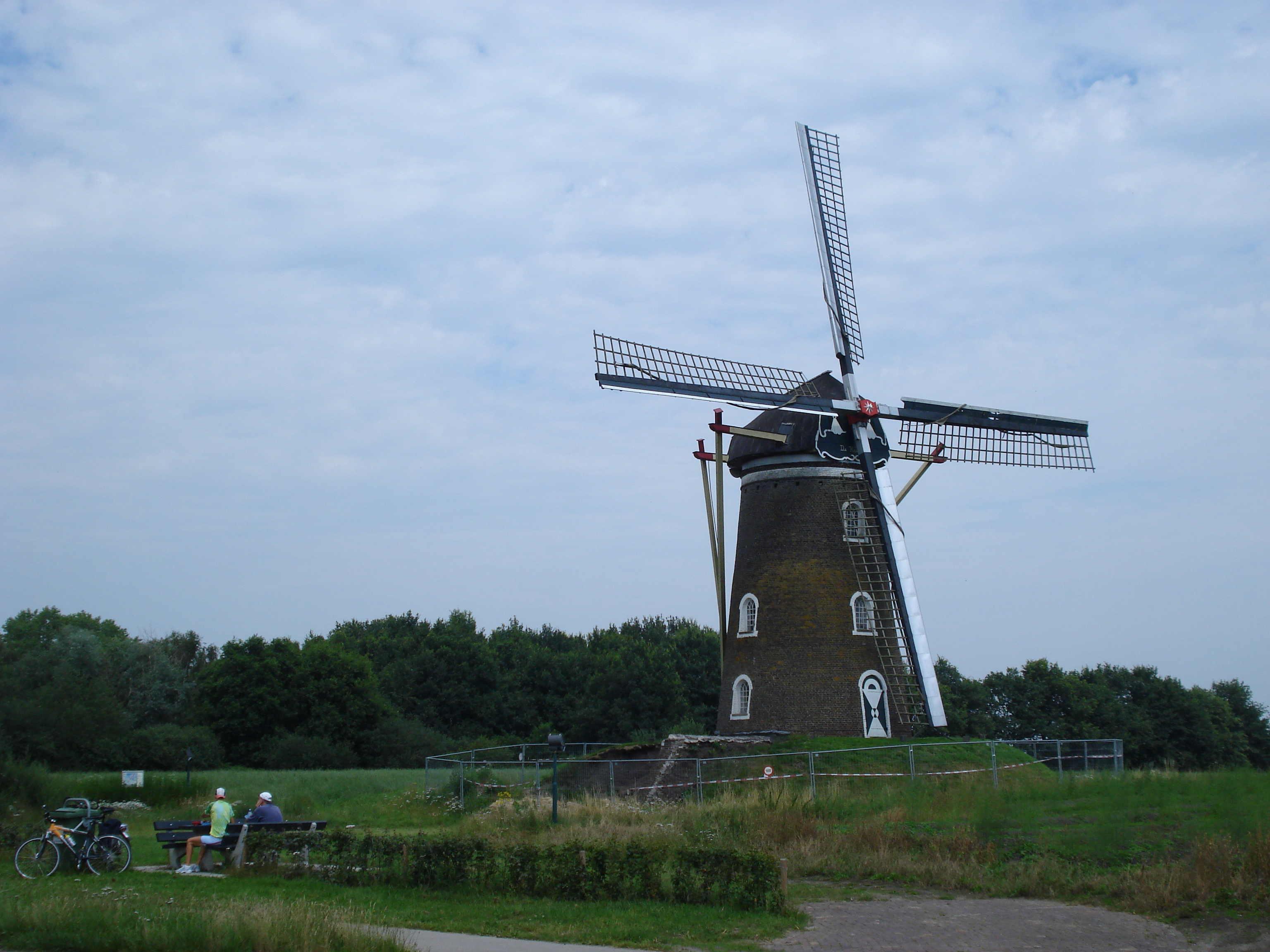
Heilmolen (mill)

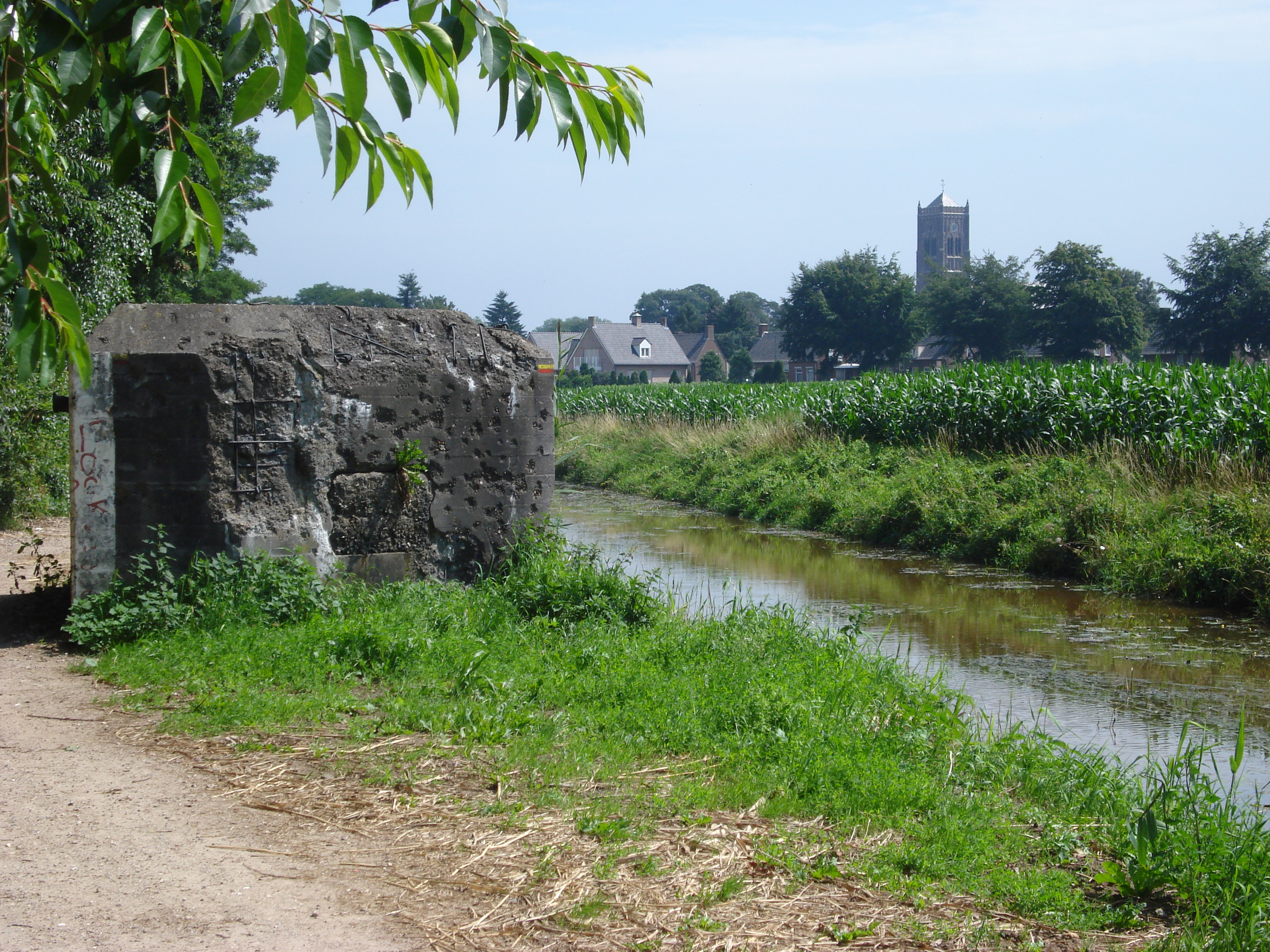
Defence canal and bunker Peel-Raam Line
