= Mill =

Mill may refer to:

== Science and technology ==
- Factory
- Gristmill
- Mill (grinding)
- Milling (machining)
- Millwork
- Paper mill
- Steel mill, a factory for the manufacture of steel
- Sugarcane mill
- Textile mill
- Watermill
- Windmill
- List of types of mill
- Mill, the arithmetic unit of the analytical engine early computer

== People ==
- Andy Mill (born 1953), American skier
- Arnold van Mill (1921–1996), Dutch bass opera singer
- Frank Mill (1958–2025), German footballer
- Harriet Taylor Mill (1807–1858), British philosopher and women's rights advocate
- Henry Mill (c. 1683–1771), English inventor who patented the first typewriter
- James Mill (1773–1836), Scottish historian, economist and philosopher
- John Mill (theologian) (c. 1645–1707), English theologian and author of Novum Testamentum Graecum
- John Stuart Mill (1806–1873), British philosopher and political economist, son of James Mill
- Loek van Mil (1984–2019), Dutch baseball pitcher
- Meek Mill, Robert Rihmeek Williams (born 1987), American rapper and songwriter

== Places ==
- Mill City, Oregon
- Mill en Sint Hubert, a Dutch municipality
- Mill, Netherlands, a Dutch village
- Mill, Missouri, a community in the United States
- Mill, an electoral ward of Magor with Undy, Monmouthshire, Wales

== Other meanings ==
- Mill (heraldry), a mill depicted in heraldry
- Mill (currency), a now-abstract unit of currency
- Diploma mill or degree mill, a provider of illegitimate academic qualifications
- Nine men's morris, known as Mill or Mills, a traditional board game
- Windmill (b-boy move), or mill, a move in b-boying (breakdancing)
- Mill., the standard author abbreviation when citing a botanical name for Philip Miller
- Major Indoor Lacrosse League (MILL), the American indoor lacrosse league, now National Lacrosse League
- An older slang term for a boxing match

== See also ==
- The Mill (disambiguation)
- Mil (disambiguation)
- Mille (disambiguation)
- Mills (disambiguation)
- Miller (disambiguation)
- Milling (disambiguation)
