= Mil =

Mil, mil, or MIL may refer to:

== Places ==
- Mil, Syria, a village in Syria
- Mil, Azerbaijan, a municipality in Beylagan Rayon
- Mil, Markazi, a village in Markazi Province, Iran
- Metropolitan area of Milan (IATA code: MIL), Italy
- Mill Hill Broadway railway station (National Rail station code: MIL), England
- Miltenberg (district), (German vehicle registration code: MIL)
- A common abbreviation for the U.S. city of Milwaukee, Wisconsin, and its major professional sports teams:
  - Milwaukee Brewers, the city's Major League Baseball team
  - Milwaukee Bucks, the city's National Basketball Association team

== Business and organizations ==
- Marine Industries Limited, a Canadian shipbuilder
- Microsystems International Limited, a former Canadian semiconductor device manufacturer
- Mil Moscow Helicopter Plant, a Russian helicopter manufacturer
- Movimiento Ibérico de Liberación (Iberian Liberation Movement), a Catalan anti-Francoist group from 1971 to 1973
- Mouvement initiative et liberté (Initiative and Liberty Movement), a French Gaullist political association
- mil.ru, official website of the Ministry of Defence (Russia)
- Munitions India Limited, an arms manufacturer

== Currency ==
- Mill (currency), a now-abstract unit of currency used sometimes in accounting
- mil, 1/1000 Cypriot pound
- mil, 1/1000 Hong Kong dollar
- mil, 1/1000 Maltese lira
- mil, 1/1000 Palestine pound

== Military ==
- .mil, the top-level Internet domain of the U.S. military
- MIL-STD and MIL-SPEC, the United States Military Standard

== Technology ==
- Malfunction indicator lamp, in a computerized engine-management system
- Media Integration Layer, the compositing engine used by Desktop Window Manager and Windows Presentation Foundation

== Units of measurement ==
- mil (imperial), a length equivalent to 0.001 inch
- Biblical mile (Hebrew: מיל; mīl), a length
- Millilitre (SI-symbol mL or ml, informally mil), a volume
- Millimetre (SI-symbol mm, informally mil or mill), a length
- Milliradian (SI-symbol mrad, informally mil, or three slightly different non-SI units), for angular measurement
- Scandinavian mile, (Norwegian and Swedish: mil), a length equivalent to 10 kilometres

== People ==
- Míl Espáine, ancestor to the Irish in Irish mythology
- Mil Máscaras (born 1942), Mexican luchador (professional wrestler)
- Mikhail Mil (1909–1970), founder of the Mil Moscow Helicopter Plant

== Other ==
- Modern Indian Language, contemporary Indian languages
- Mother-in-law

== See also ==
- 1,000,000, one million
- Mill (disambiguation)
- Per mille, or per mil, parts per thousand
