= Milling =

Milling may refer to:

- Milling (minting), forming narrow ridges around the edge of a coin
- Milling (grinding), breaking solid materials into smaller pieces by grinding, crushing, or cutting in a mill
- Milling (machining), a process of using rotary cutters to remove material from a workpiece
- Milling (military training exercise), a type of boxing session in the British army
- Milling (surname), a surname
- Milling, a stage in Fulling, a woollen clothmaking process
- Milling, using milliradian marks to determine range
- Pavement milling, removing the surface of a paved area
- Photochemical machining, processes involved in photographic engraving and sheet metal manufacture

== See also ==
- Mill (disambiguation)
- Miller (disambiguation)
