= Milling (surname) =

Milling is a surname. Notable people with this name include:

- Amanda Milling (born 1975), British politician
- Henry Milling (died 1822), British Army officer
- Hugh Milling (1962–2003), Irish cricketer
- James Milling (born 1965), American football player
- Kara Milling (born 1976), American volleyball player
- Stephen Milling, Danish operatic bass singer
- Thomas D. Milling (1887–1960), pioneer of military aviation and a brigadier general in the U.S. Army Air Corps
- Amalie Milling (born 1999), Danish handball player

== See also ==
- Michael Crowley-Milling (1917–2012), Welsh engineer
