= Tongelaar Castle =

Castle in the Netherlands

- Kasteel Tongelaar
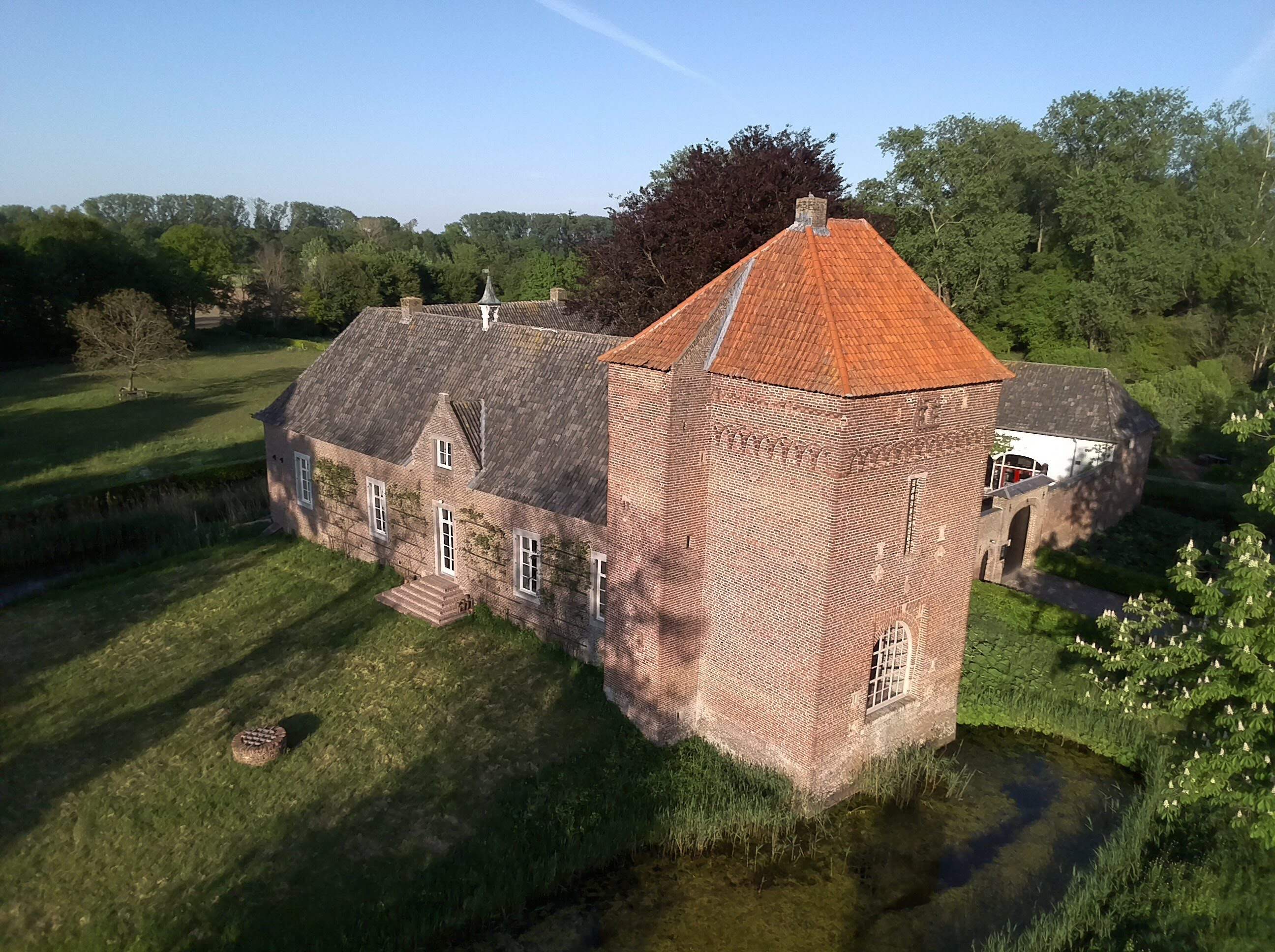
- Tongelaar Castle

Site information
- Type: Castle
- Open to the public: Yes, in Summer

Location
- The Netherlands
- Coordinates: 51.712917°N 5.780167°E

Tongelaar Castle (also Tongelaer) is located between Mill and Gassel in North-Brabant, Netherlands.

== Tongelaar today ==
=== The castle ===
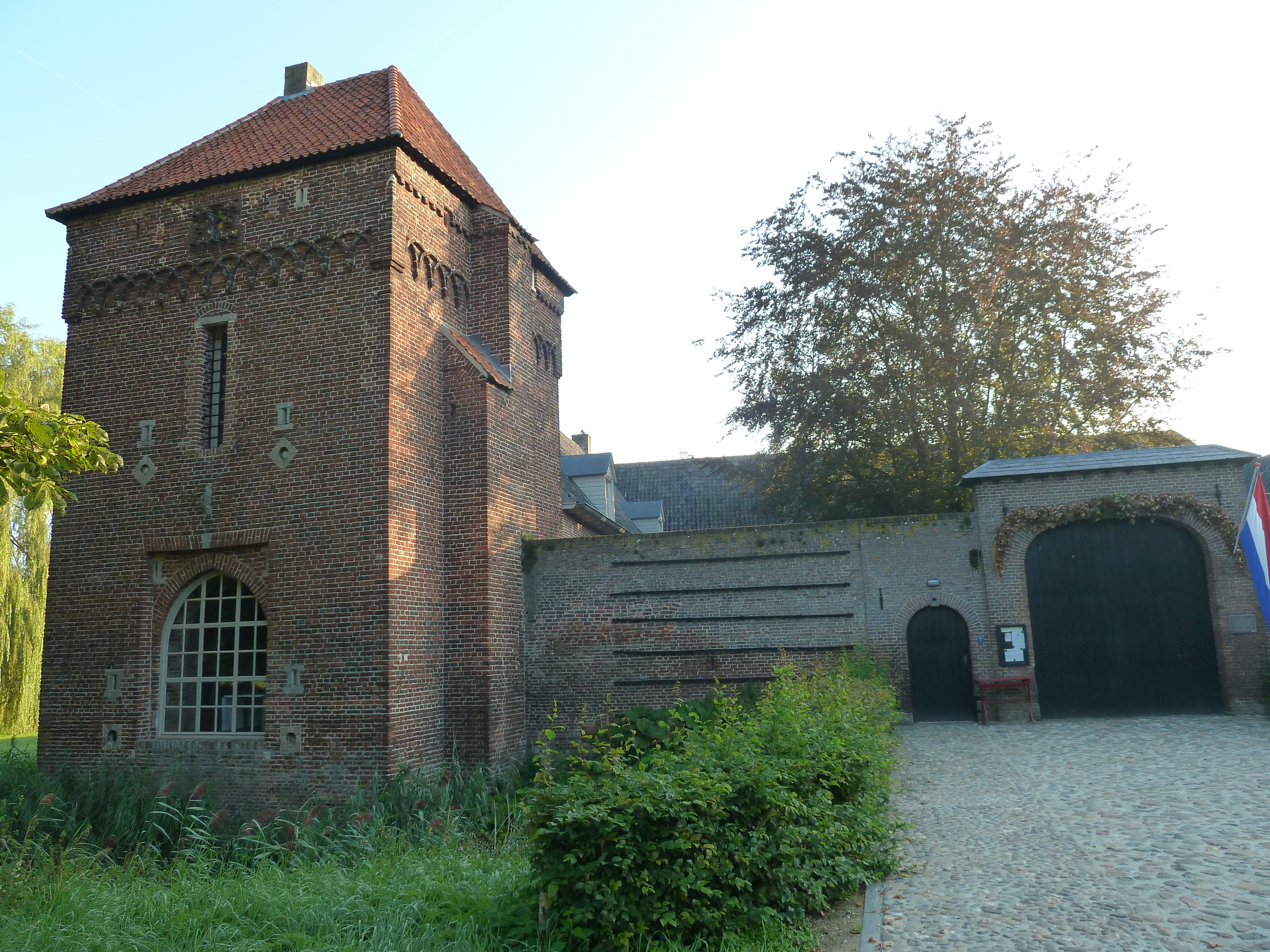
The tower with elements for use of the drawbridge

The current castle is a part of, and is built on top of, the bailey of a previous castle. The main structure or keep stood just west of it. A restored well marks this location. The big tower was part of this previous castle. The old keep was demolished before 1752.

The big tower was the gatehouse of the bailey of the old castle. It is dated to the late 14th century, that is the same as the oldest construction found on the grounds of the main castle. The current castle is square, and had a gate in its southern wall. The west wing probably dates from the 18th century. Its foundations use the same brick as the former gatehouse, but this could be reuse. The north wing probably also dates from the 18th century, but takes the place of older buildings. The age of the east wing is unknown. The southern wall is oldest, and still contains walled up embrasures. There were also buildings along this wall. In the 19th century one still had to cross a drawbridge to enter the castle.

=== Current use of the castle ===
The castle is now primarily in use as a venue for business meetings, weddings, and other events. There are also art exhibitions and concerts. The farm 'De Benedenhof' is next to the castle and can be hired for short stays. In Summer, the castle is generally open on Wednesdays and Sundays.

The tower is now an information center about the surrounding nature reserve run by Brabants Landschap.

=== The nature reserve ===
The nature reserve Landgoed Tongelaar (Tongelaar manor) is the main attraction of Tongelaar. It measures 490 hectares, and is home to about 50 european badgers. The management of the reserve caters to this animal. The reserve is freely accessible along pedestrian and cycle routes.

== Castle characteristics ==
The first version of Tongelaar Castle was probably a Motte-and-bailey castle. This is indicated by the form of the terrain of the old keep, and by that terrain being known as Het Mot. However, remains of a motte and bailey castle, or from the time that such castles were built, have not been found.

During archaeological excavations in 1964 a later castle was discovered. The first building was a late-14th century square keep of 6.9 m by 8.6 m. Its walls were 100–120 cm thick, made from brick of unknown size. In a later phase two 4.8 m by 3.9 m annexes with a wall thickness of 85–100 cm were added on the northern and southern side. The foundation of these annexes consisted of Limburg chalk and bricks of 27 by 14 by 6 cm. The discovery of many bones on the northern side makes it likely that this side contained a kitchen.

In a third phase, a square 7 by 6 m tower was added on the south east side. The walls of this tower were again 100–120 cm thick. This might have been the gate house of the main castle. It contained a well, and perhaps a bridge cellar.

The former bailey and current castle is dominated by a single big tower. Its ground plan measures 7.72 by 7.86 m and it is almost square. Its walls are slightly more than 1.5 m thick. On its western side is a stair tower. On its eastern side were toilets that drained into the moat.

The tower still clearly shows its origin as a gate house. It still has the gate, but also the elements that enabled the operation of the drawbridge, like the support where the bridge pivoted against the wall, hinges for the doors, and openings for the chains or ropes that pulled the draw bridge up. Later, a door and windows were made in the eastern wall of the tower. The stair tower has a small defendable cellar with embrasures fit for arquebusses. The former gatehouse was built with toilets and a fireplace mantel on the first floor. This makes that the gatehouse was intended for habitation from the start. This is rare for a bailey gatehouse in the Netherlands.

== History ==
=== The Lords of Cuijk ===
At a certain time the Lords of Cuijk were in possession of Tongelaar Castle. The Heerlijkheid Cuijk was a lordship with Grave as its only city. Jan I of Cuijk (?-1308) was the most famous Lord of Cuijk. In 1282 he dedicated Tongelaar Castle to Floris V, Count of Holland and received it back as a fief. In the deed it was referred to as munitionem et castrum nostrum, or our fortification and castle. Jan I probably made the move to protect his assets in Holland, more specifically Rijnland. On 5 May 1296 Jan ended his allegiance to Floris V. Jan is regarded as the chief conspirator in the abduction of Floris V near Utrecht, which led to Floris' murder on 27 June 1296. The abduction was done by Jan's nephew Gijsbrecht IV of Amstel and Herman VI van Woerden. Floris was killed by Gerard van Velsen.

The castle and its lords now became attached to the Dukes of Brabant. Jan I of Cuijk was succeeded as Lord of Cuijk by his junior son Otto, who ruled from 1308 till 1350. Next came Jan II (1350), Jan III (1354), Jan IV (1364), Wenemar (1382) and Jan V (1386). The main branch of the Cuijk dynasty ended with Joanna (1394), sister of the childless Jan V. She abdicated the Heerlijkheid Cuijck and its important city Grave to Guelders in 1400.

=== The first Lords of Tongelaar ===
The first Lords of Tongelaar came from junior branches of the Lords of Cuijk. In 1266 Beatrix of Cuijk was said to be heiress of Asten (south of Helmond) and Escharen, close to Tongelaar Castle. 'Heiress' points to these territories being allodial property. Beatrix married Willem de Roover Lord of Lierop and Stakenborg. Willem lord of Asten and Escharen was referred to as such in 1306. In 1308 Willem of Escharen put the seal of the lords of Asten on an act. He was therefore probably one of the children of Beatrix and Willem de Roover. He was married to Margaretha van Boischot. Their son Henrick van Stakenborg might have sold Asten and Escharen to Joanna, Duchess of Brabant. Pieter Couterel then got the fief of Asten in 1362, but after his death it came to the Cuijk branch of Hoogstraten.

There is little proof to connect these lords of Asten or Escharen to the current Tongelaar Castle. While the usage of the name Tongelaar points to an early castle at the site, or in the immediate surroundings, the archaeological evidence uncovered at the present site does not predate the second half of the fourteenth century.

=== The current castle ===
The current Tongelaar castle can be connected to Escharen. Until 1800 Tongelaar was part of the Parish of Escharen, even while it was part of the municipality of Gassel. Some farms in Escharen: 'De Groote Hoff' or 'Den Heihoek' and 'Groot Kammerberg' and 'Klein Kammerberg' belonged to Tongelaar. Furthermore, excavations in Escharen in 2001 uncovered the medieval church of the village.

A wooden church had been built at the site in Escharen in about 1000. A tuff church was built in the 12th century, but was ravaged in 1602. Due to severe damage during the 1674 Siege of Grave, and a lack of maintenance it next fell in ruins. In 1702 Hendrik Antoon van Berchem, Lord of Tongelaar from 1666 to 1729, therefore wanted to move the graves of his family to the Catholic church of Boxmeer. The link between Escharen and the current castle was solidly established when during the 2001 excavations a grave slab with three leopards was found. It could be identified as the weapon of the Van Bocholt family, which appeared at Tongelaar in 1490.

Furthermore, in 1377 a chapel dedicated to St-Catherine was founded on the castle. This was done by Squire Jan van Cuijk ('Joannes de Cuyck') and his wife Elisabeth, Jan was the son of Lord Wemmarus of Cuijk Knight. The curate of the chapel would receive 20 gold guilders a year from Tongelaar, and would read mass twice a week. The chapel was subordinate to the parish Escharen. In 1900 a small altar and confessional still remained.

=== Van Merwijk ===
The demise of the main branch of the Van Cuijk family in 1400 made that its 'Cuijk' possessions became owned by the Duke of Guelders. It is not known whether this included Tongelaar Castle. In 1445 Cornelis van Merwijck was mentioned as Lord of Tongelaar. He might have inherited it from the last Lord of Cuijk Jan V. Another option is that Tongelaar first came into the possession of Johanna van Cuijk van Herpen, who married Gerard van Merwijck of Empel en Meerwijk Castle.

Cornelis van Merweijck fought for Guelders. He married Catharina van Kessel, and had Willem van Merwijck heer van Grubbenvorst (?-1513). Willem van Merwijck married Margaretha van der Donck (?-1484) daughter of Jan van der Donck Lord in Sevenum and Erp. Their daughter Johanna van Merwijck (?-1550), granddaughter of Cornelis van Merwijck inherited Tongelaar on the death of Willem in 1513.

Arnt van Bocholtz had married Johanna van Merwijck, and so he became the next Lord of Tongelaar in 1513. As 'Ambtman' of Grave, Arnt resided in Grave Castle. After Arnt's death his inheritance was divided. Their son Floris van Bocholtz inherited Tongelaar. In 1567 he was governor of Grave. Floris married four times. With his fourth wife Marie van Varick he had a daughter Maria van Bocholtz.

=== Van Berchem ===
With the Van Berchem family Tongelaar acquired famous owners from Antwerp. Hendrik van Berchem bought the Heerlijkheid Berchem near Antwerp in 1555. Antoon van Berchem, lord of Berchem (1581–1608) married Maria van Bocholtz, and so became the next lord of Tongelaar. Their son Hendrik II van Berchem (1609–1635) married Isabelle Roevelasca (?-1629). Their son Hendrik III van Berchem (1611–1673) succeeded them in Berchem in 1635.

Floris van Berchem (1615–1687), younger son of Henri III inherited Tongelaar, but was also mayor of Antwerp. He married Anne Placide 't Serclaes. They had a son Henri Antoine van Berchem (?-1729) Lord of Tongelaar. He embraced Jansenism and wrote books about religion. He died in Utrecht, and might have lived at Tongelaar. With his wife Agathe Clémence Kieffel, he had a daughter Marie Anne Florence Thérèse van Berchem (?-1697) heiress of Tongelaar. There is a sumptuous funeral monument for her in the chapel of the Sint-Jacobsgasthuis in Tongeren.

=== Hinnisdael ===
Marie Anne van Berchem married François de Hinnisdael (?-1728) lord of Betho etc. Their son Joseph Guillaume Mathieu de Hinnisdael married Isabelle Charlotte van Hoensbroek. Their son Henri Antoine Bernard de Hinnisdael married Marie-Thérèse de Mettecoven in 1753. Their daughter Thérèse Marie Ferdinande Isabelle countess of Hinnisdael de Crayn (?-1825) inherited Tongelaar.

=== De Thiennes ===
Charles Ignace Philippe count of Thiennes de Lombize (?-1839) married Thérèse Marie, and so Tongelaar came into his family. They had a son Adolphe Walter count of Thiennes de Lombize (?-1814) married to Françoise Louise Countess of Merode. These had Marie Ghislain, married to Prosper Jean Count of Ribaucourt, and Françoise Louise. In 1840 these divided the inheritance of their paternal grandparents. Françoise Louise got Tongelaar, an estate of 305 hectares in the municipalities of Gassel, Mill, Escharen, Linden, Beers and Beugen.

Marc Antoine Marquess of Boëssiére-Thiennes (?-1881) married Françoise Louise. They got Gaetan Marc marquess of Boëssiére-Thiennes. In 1917 Gaetan made plans to sell the castle and 11 farms together over 300 hectares. In the end castle and 10 adjacent farms were offered separately from the farm the Heihoek of 24 hectares.

=== The twentieth century ===
In July 1917 Louisa van Nispen widow of E. van Rijckevorsel van Kessel bought the castle and farms for 314,517.50 guilders. In 1918 three farms were then offered to sell, and seven for hire.

Already in 1918 the castle and most of the farms were sold to the brothers J.S., H.F. en S.J. van Wagenberg from Vlijmen. In 1976 A. van Wagenberg sold Tongelaar to G. Theeuwes from Tilburg. In 1978 the castle and most of farms were sold to Het Brabants Landschap, the current owner.

== Gallery ==
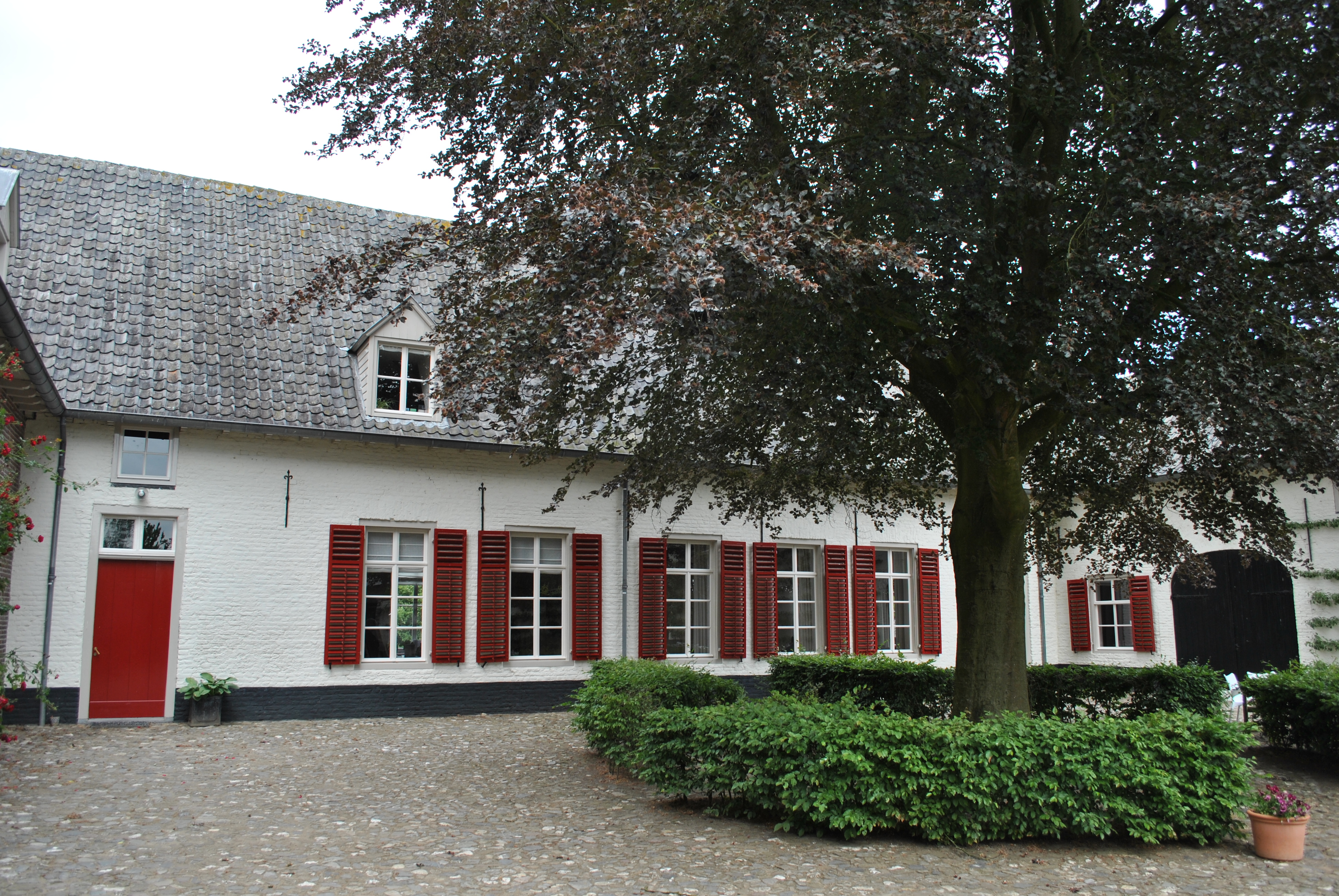
Court of Tongelaar Castle

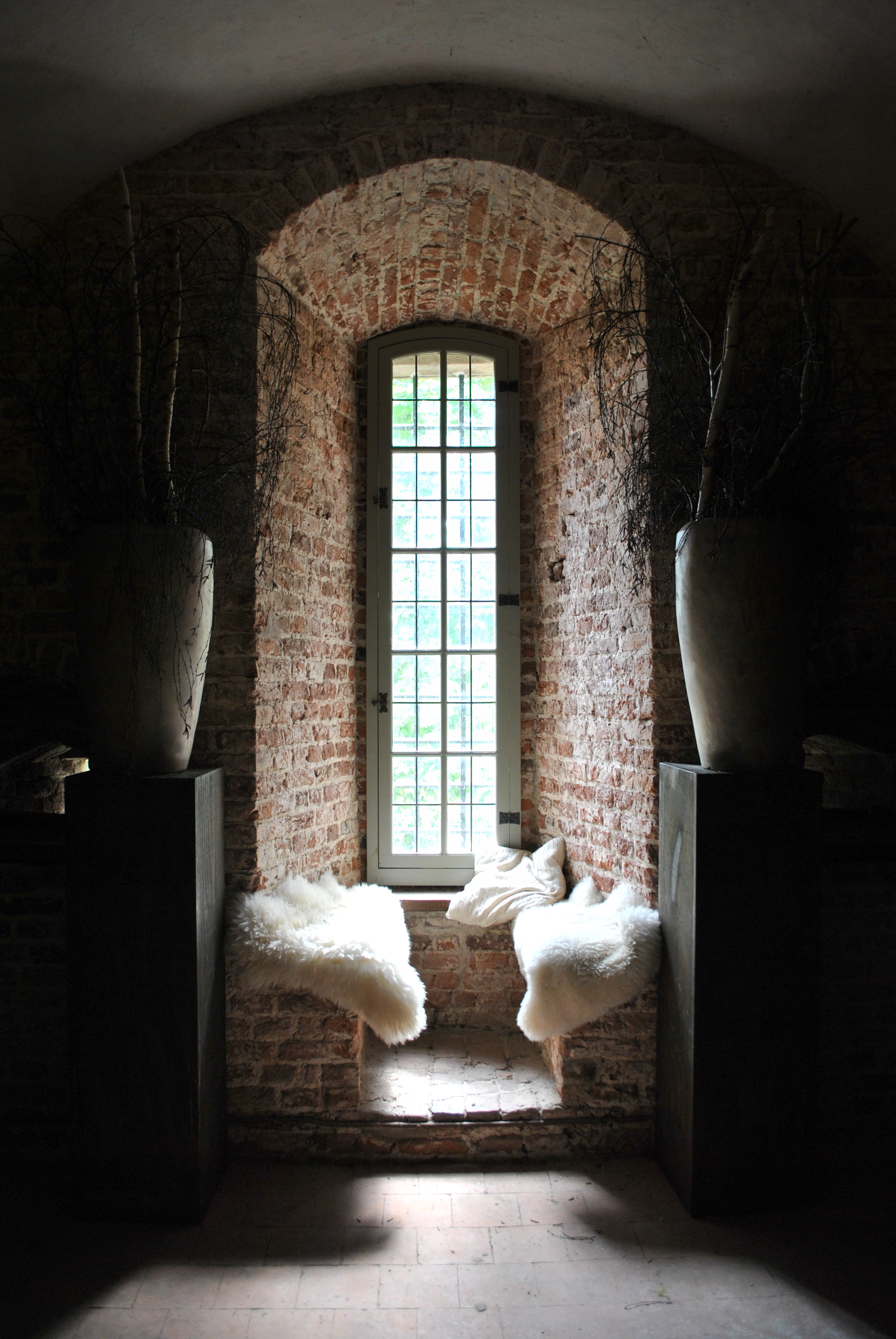
On the second level of the tower.

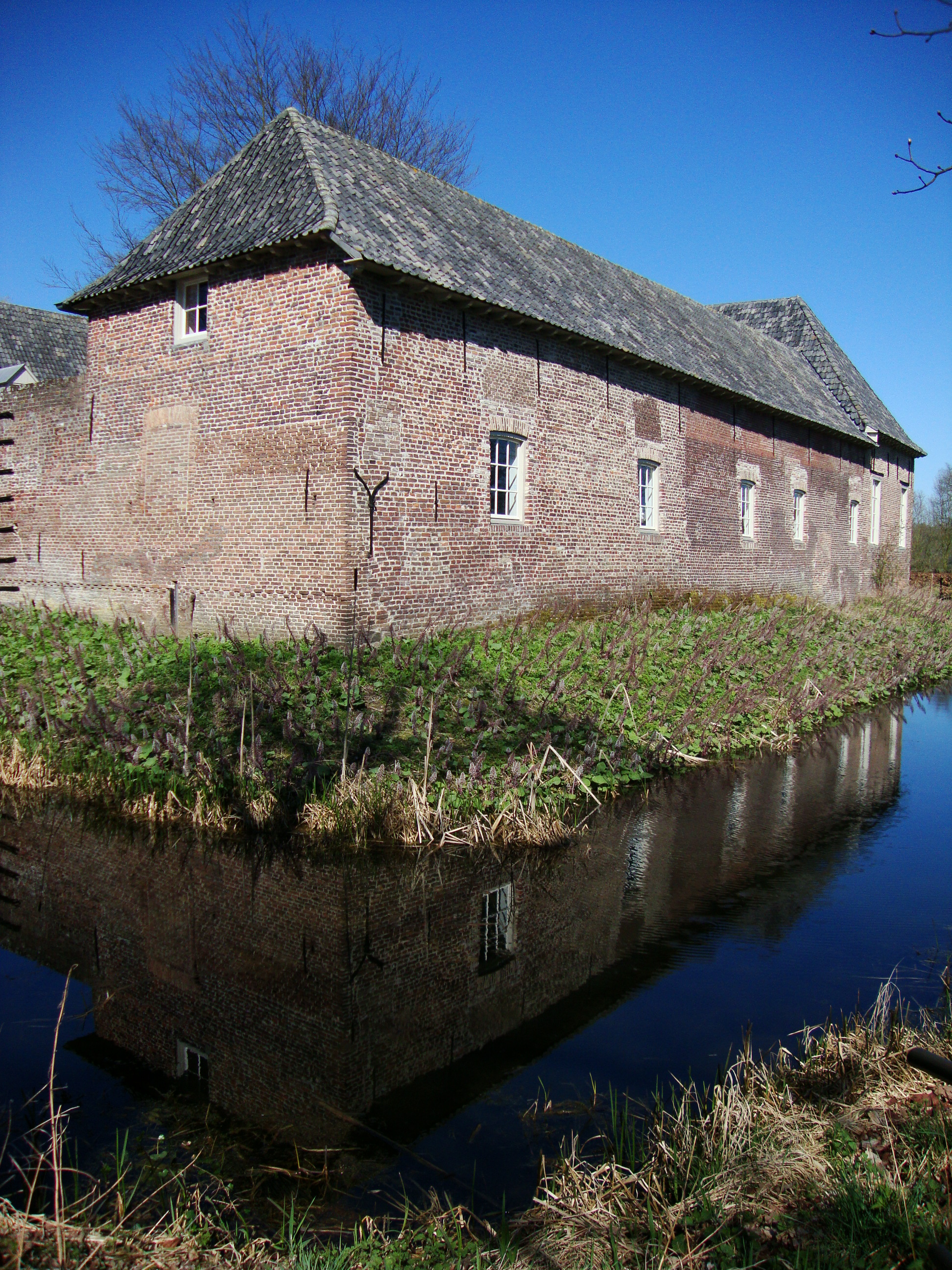
east wing
