= The Mill =

The Mill may refer to:

== Art ==
- The Mill (Burne-Jones painting), a painting by British artist Edward Burne-Jones
- The Mill (Rembrandt), a painting by Dutch baroque artist Rembrandt
  - The Mill (Rembrandt print), 1641

== Film and television ==
- The Mill (1921 film), Swedish film
- The Mill (2023 film), American film
- The Mill (TV series), a 2013 British period television drama
- The Mill, the fictional workplace in Doctors

== Organisations and venues ==
- The Mill (building), an apartment complex in Ipswich, England
- The Mill (company), a British post-production and visual effects company, now headquartered in Paris, France
- The Mill, Adelaide, a multidisciplinary organisation, studios, and theatre in Adelaide, South Australia

== Other uses ==
- The Mill (newspaper), a local online newspaper operating in Greater Manchester

== See also ==
- Mill (disambiguation)
