= Mil, Syria =

Village in Aleppo Governorate, Syria

Coordinates: 36°37′N 38°33′E

Mil is a village in Ayn al-Arab District, Aleppo Governorate, Syria, and according to the 2004 census, the village had a population of 328 residents.
