= Sint Hubert =

- Village
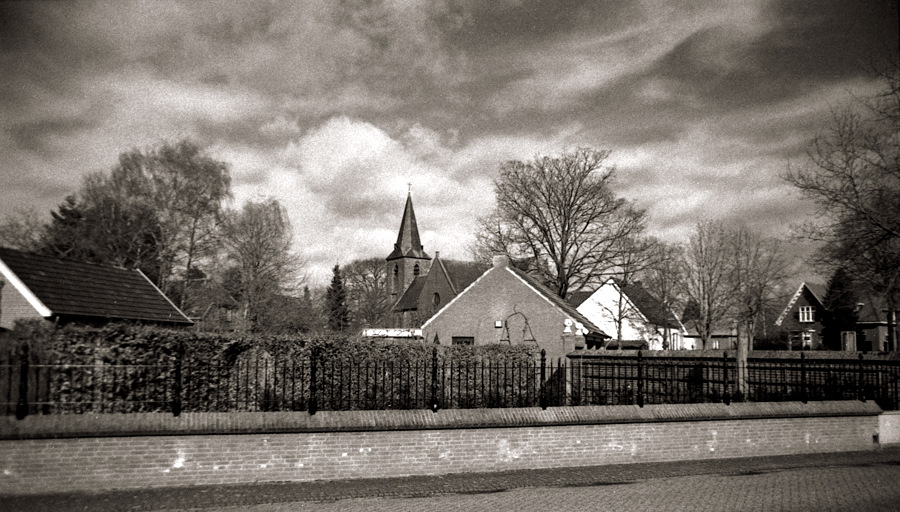
- View on Sint Hubert

- Location in the province of North Brabant in the Netherlands Sint Hubert (Netherlands)
- Coordinates: 51°41′N 5°48′E
- Country: Netherlands
- Province: North Brabant
- Municipality: land van Cuijk

Area
  - Total: 8.32 km^{2} (3.21 sq mi)
- Elevation: 11 m (36 ft)

Population (2021)
  - Total: 1,435
  - Density: 172/km^{2} (447/sq mi)
- Time zone: UTC+1 (CET)
  - Summer (DST): UTC+2 (CEST)
- Postal code: 5454
- Dialing code: 0485

Sint Hubert is a village in the Dutch province of North Brabant, in the former municipality of Mill en Sint Hubert. Since 2022 it has been part of the municipality of Land van Cuijk.

== History ==
Sint Hubert developed in the Late Middle Ages around a church. It became an independent parish in 1796.

The Catholic Hubertus en Barbara church dates from 1459. The choir was renewed in 1934 and a transept was added. The grist mill Heimolen was built in 1878. It was heavily damaged in 1944, but was restored and returned to operation. The wind mill became owned by the municipality after the miller died in 1978. The wind mill remains in operation on a voluntary basis.

Sint Hubbert was home to 165 people in 1840. It used to be part of the municipality of Mill en Sint Hubert. In 2022, it became part of Land van Cuijk.

== Gallery ==
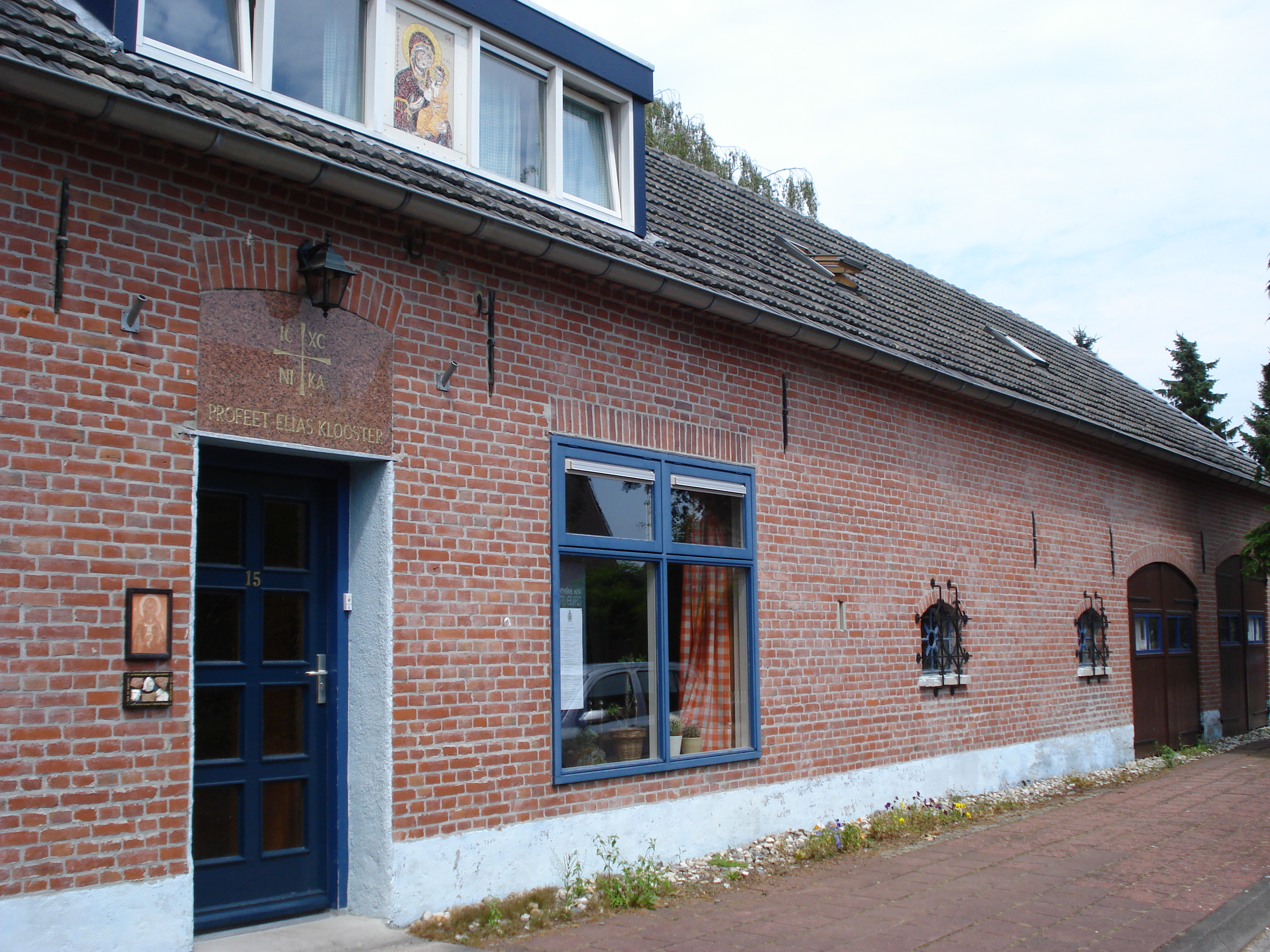
Russian Orthodox monastery

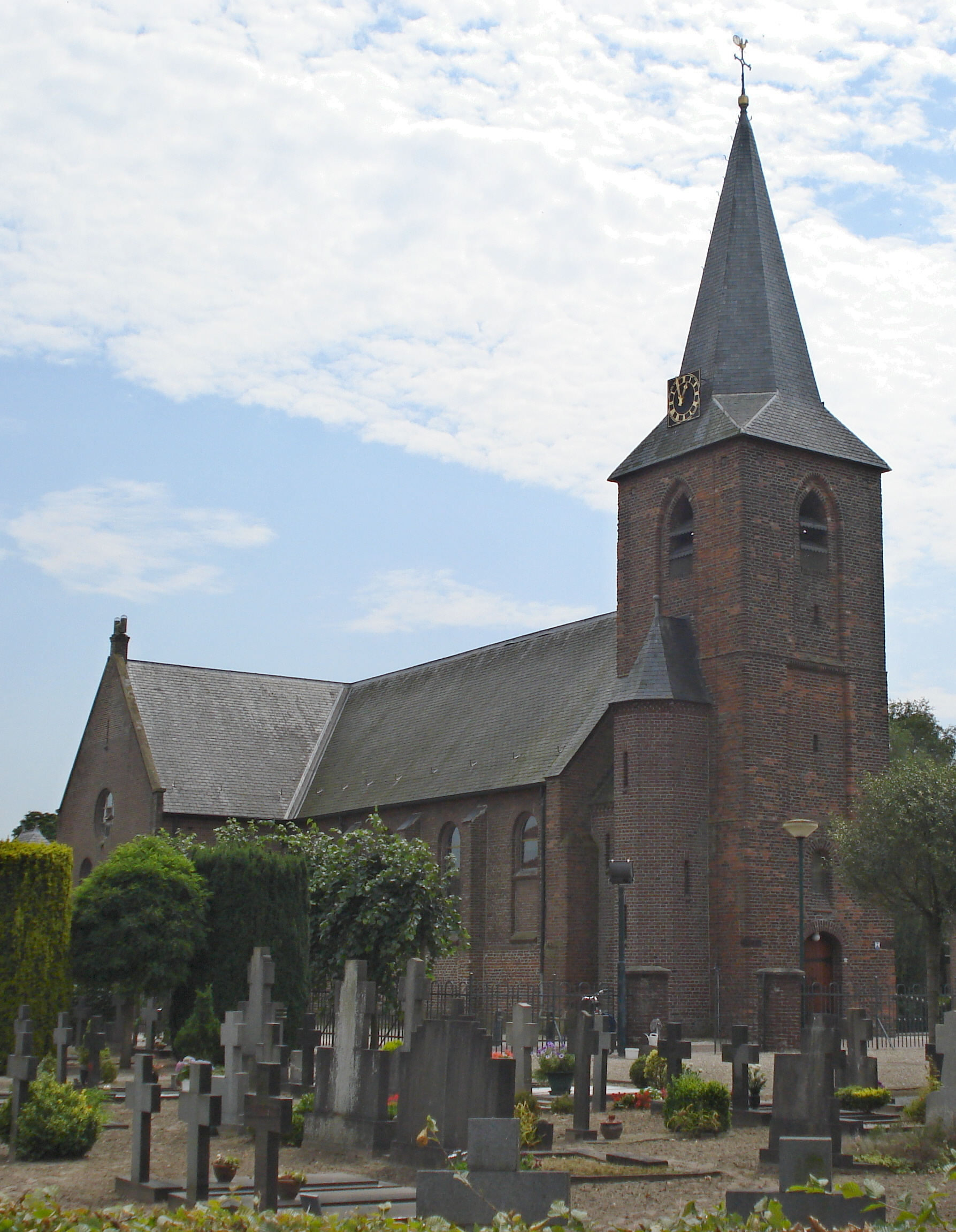
Church of St Hubert

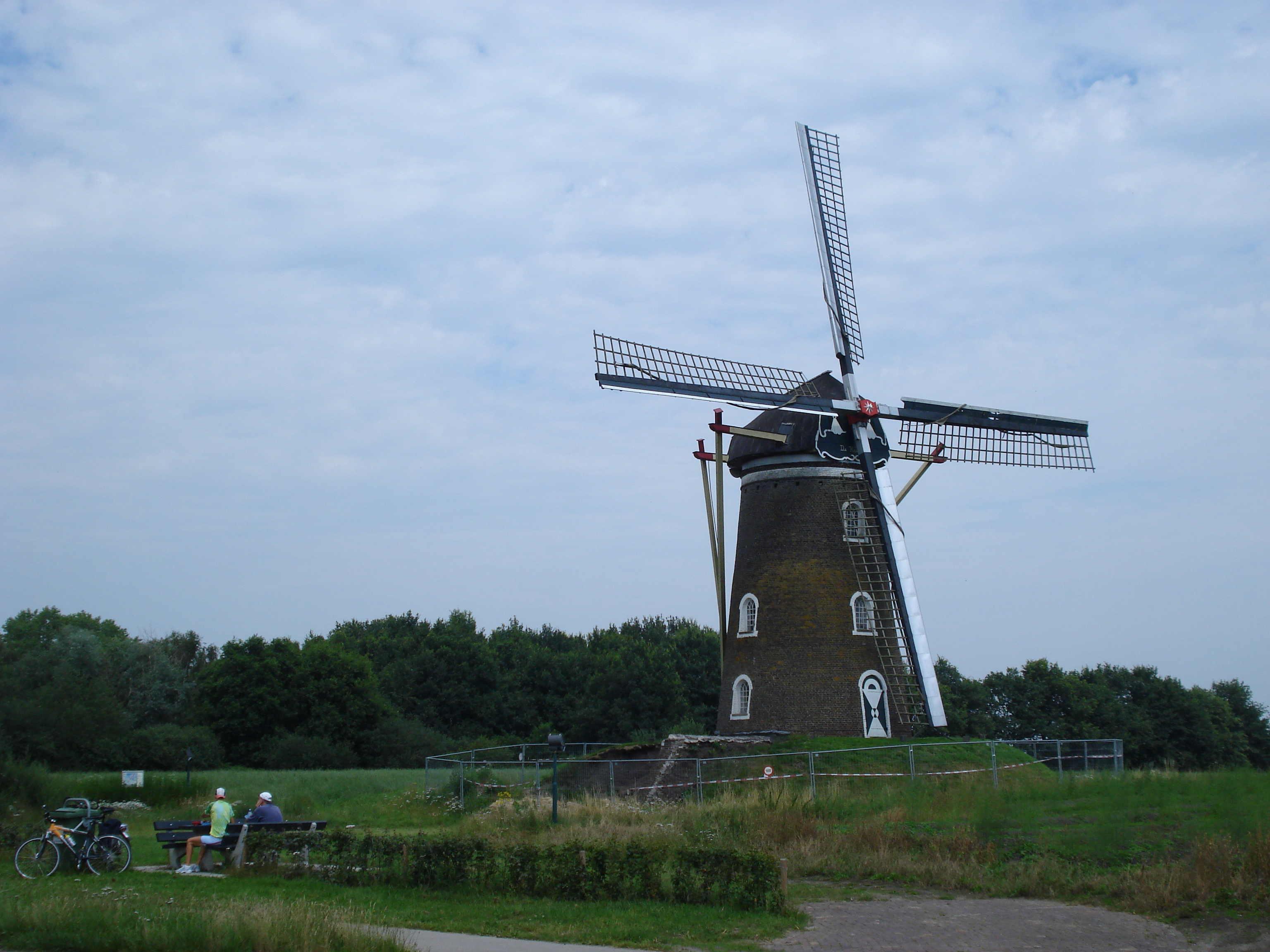
Wind mill Heimolen

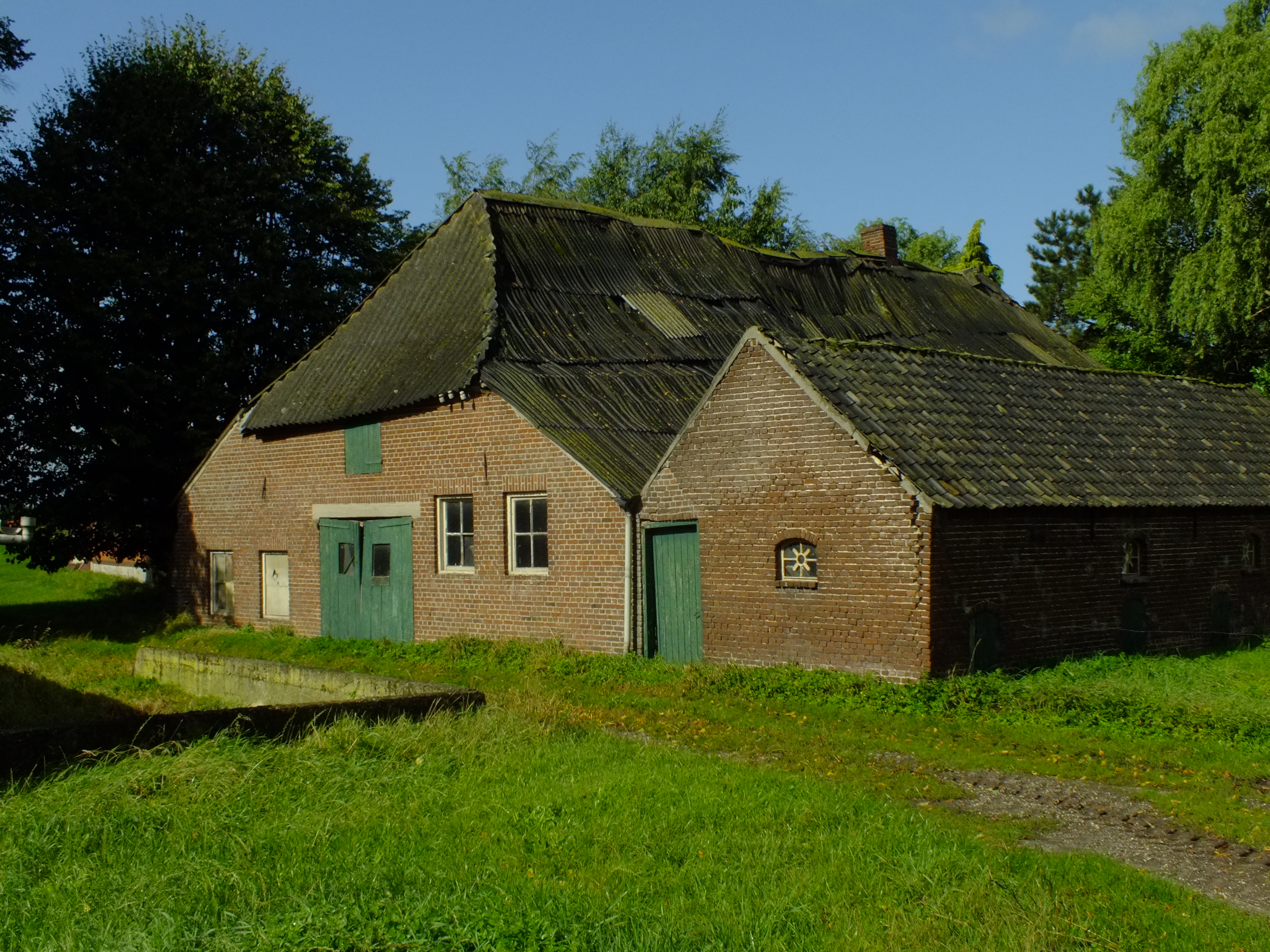
Farm in St Hubert
