= Kees Bastiaans =

Dutch painter

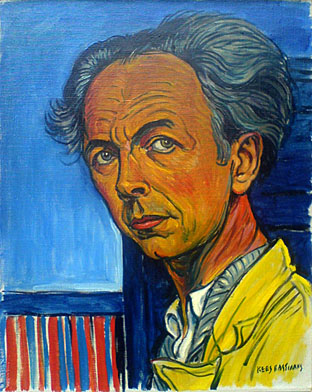

Cornelis Bernardus "Kees" Bastiaans (20 November 1909, Mill, Netherlands – 31 March 1986, Mill) was a Dutch painter. He was an Expressionist, often with a religious theme to his work. One of his paintings Familieportret is exhibited in the Noordbrabants Museum in 's-Hertogenbosch.
