= Aldendriel Castle =

Castle in Mill, North-Brabant, Netherlands

- Kasteel Aldendriel
- Mill
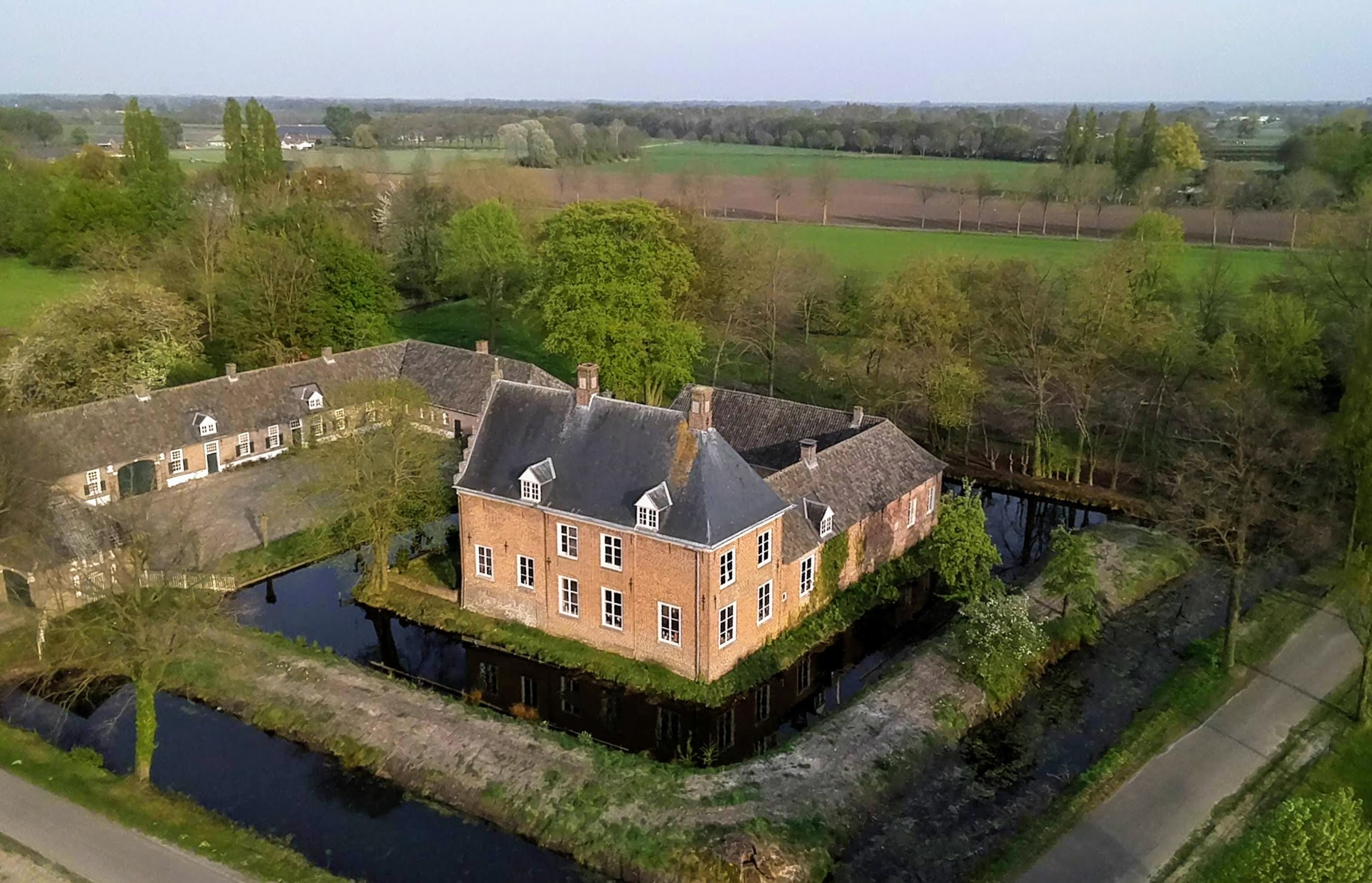
- Aldendriel Castle in 2020

Site information
- Open to the public: No

Location
- The Netherlands
- Coordinates: 51.687319°N 5.788338°E

Site history
- Built: 1477

Aldendriel Castle is late medieval castle in Mill, North-Brabant, Netherlands

== Castle Characteristics ==
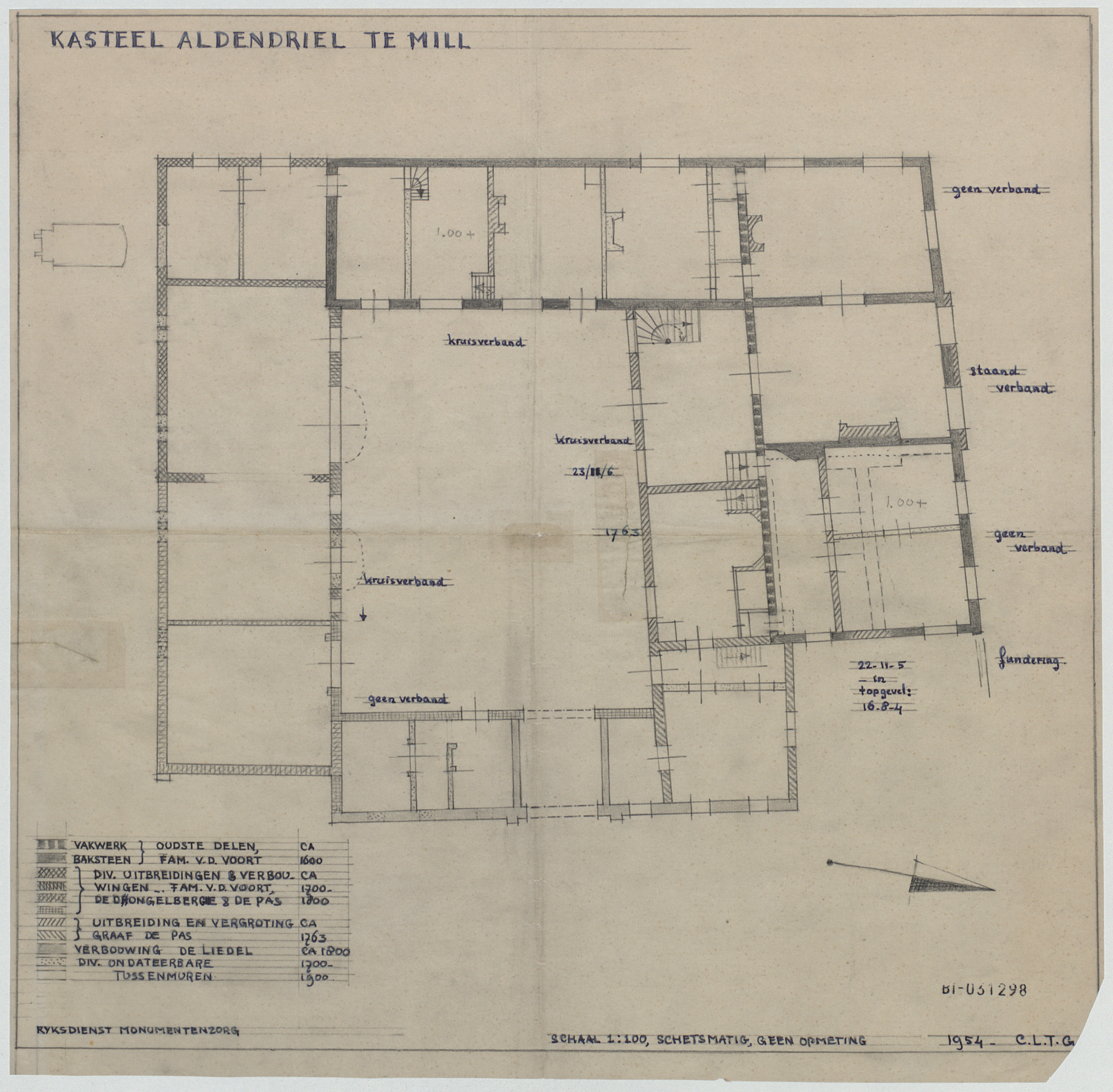
Floor plan drawn in 1954.

Aldendriel Castle is a late medieval castle with a large outer bailey. It dates back to 1477. There are no indications that it ever had walls that were able to withstand a siege. However, the castle does have a wide double moat. This suggests a defendable character, even if it could not be defended against siege equipment.

The main building on the current keep consists of two parts. The highest, northern and western parts, are sixteenth century, and contain parts built with timber framing. During the seventeenth century the castle became a square building of about the current size. By that time, any defensive aspects of the site were obsolete.

In 1763 the main building got a new façade on the inter court side. This is also the time that the northern façade got a protruding part in the center. In 1800 the gatehouse was changed, or a new gatehouse was built. This finally resulted in the two stepped gables, see floor plan of 1954.

The outer bailey, with its five gates with brick pilasters and stone capitals is seventeenth century. The outer bailey reflects the manorial functions of the estate.

== Current use ==
In 2021 the castle was still private property. The main mansion continuous to have a residential purpose. The outer bailey is a venue for parties and business meetings for 50-350 persons. It is popular for weddings, employee parties, business meetings and other events. There is no general access for the public.

== History ==
=== Van der Voort ===
From about 1500, members of the Van der Voort family are mentioned near Mill. In 1636 Barthold van der Voort married Maria van Eyck. Their son Albert Francis van der Voort married Maria Pollart in 1685.

=== Van Dongelberg ===
Henry Albert Barthold of Dongelberghe (?-1727) had married Catharina Maria van Eyck (?-1753). She was the daughter of the older brother of Maria van Eyck. She inherited Blaarthem Castle from her father, and brought it into her marriage to Van Dongelberghe. Some of their children were: Philip Charles (1695-1740); Barthold Henry, Lord of Aldendriel (1697-1719); and Francis Hyacinth (1710-1780) Aldendriel was obviously inherited by her family via Maria van Eyck.

In 1727 Philip Charles de Dongelberghe transferred the castle and all his goods in Mill to the Baron of Dongelberghe, lord of Blaarthem. In 1737 C.M. van Eyck douarière de Dongelberghe got a farm.

In 1753 Francis Hyacinth became formal owner of some lands which had previously belonged to Philip Charles. This might have been a legal move to enable the subsequent sale of the domains.

=== Comte de Pas Marquis de Feuquières ===
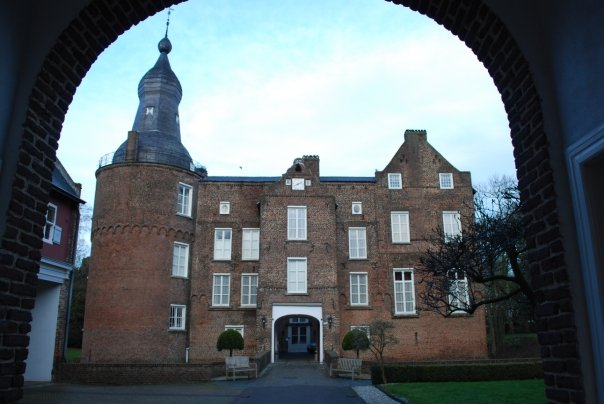
Well Castle

Arms of De Liedel de Pas

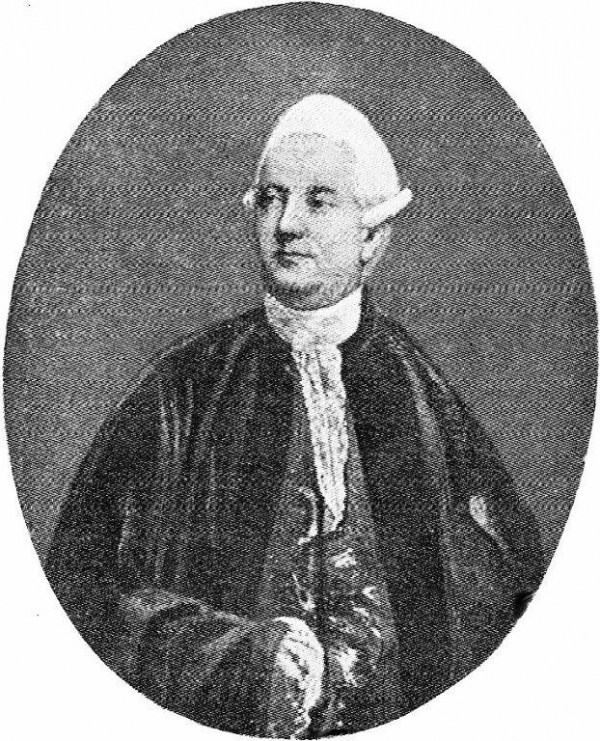
Peter William de Liedel de Pas

The Comtes de Pas became lords of Kasteel Well in the late seventeenth century. Henri comte de Pas had three sons. In 1701 the third son Maximilian married Amelia Catharina Bormans, a marriage way below his station. His mother disinherited him in her 1711 will, and so he had to litigate to get his inheritance. In 1725 his son Anthony Maximilian (1708-1771) succeeded him. In November 1733 he married Odilia Louise van Stepraedt. In 1754 Anthony de Pas bought Aldendriel from the Baron of Dongelbergh for 11,000 guilders.

=== De Liedel ===
Willem Liedel, son of a Prussian petty official became a ship doctor. He sailed with the Dutch East India Company for the first time in 1735. After making a few trips to the East Indies, he became a free citizen in Batavia in 1745. He acquired a huge fortune, and then returned to the Netherlands. Here he settled at the Leuvehaven in Rotterdam. In 1750 he discovered that his grandniece Odilia was wife to the childless Lord of Well (and Aldendriel). The very rich Willem then contacted the debt-ridden count. It therefore seems likely that Liedel provided the money for the above purchase.

In 1764 Willem Liedel bought a knight title in Frankfurt. The big renovation of the castle is dated to the year 1763, formed by the anchor plates in a wall. It shows that Liedel was involved at Aldendriel before he became its owner. He might have needed a residence to be able to buy the knight title. He also bought 15 other parcels of land from Dongelberghe. In 1755, 1760 and 1766 he bought some more land under Mill.

On 14 December 1771 the Comte de Pas died. His widow then made Knight Willem de Liedel heir to the lordship of Well and Aldendriel, and died two months later. On 4 March 1772 Willem was installed as Lord of Well, and changed his name to De Liedel de Well. On 2 June he then married the 22 year old Theresia Josepha Maria Coget.

Their son Pierre Guillaume de Liedel became the next lord of Well and Aldendriel. He would gain some favor with king Louis Bonaparte of Holland and Emperor Napoleon. He became a baron of the French empire, and later (1822) in the Dutch nobility. Pierre Guillaume married Baronin Anna von Schlossnigg. Their children Willem Lodewijk Jan Baptist (1799-1849) and Sophia Francisca Antonia (1801-1816) were already dead when Pierre Guillaume de Liedel died on 2 December 1852.

=== Von Schloissnigg ===
Marianne, sister of Pierre Guillaume de Liedel married the brother of Pierre Guillaume's wife in 1802 in Vienna. On the death of Pierre Guillaume, Aldendriel and Well were therefore inherited by her offspring. Her son Franz Seraphin Peter Freiherr von Schlossnigg became the next lord of Well and Aldendriel.

A Ms. Marianne Evers van Aldendriel (1804-1878) kept the usufruct of Pierre Guillaume's estate. In old books she appears without explanation. The reason is that Pierre Guillaume de Liedel had an affair with Eleonore Philippine von Schloissnigg (1780-1851), the younger sister of his wife. The affair led to the birth of Marianne von Evers van Aldendriel. Of course she could not become lady of Well, but her father provided for her by giving her the usufruct of his estate till her death. There is a note that she was owner of Aldendriel, instead of having only the usufruct like she had at Well. She was probably the mother of Willem and Marianne der Nederlanden, who are assumed to be illegitimate children of William II of the Netherlands.

Franz Seraphin Johann (1842-1899) was a grandson of Marianne de Liedel de Well. In 1878 he was the first Von Schloissnigg who could use the inheritance. The Von Schloissniggs would quite regularly visit their castle in Summer. The next successor Franz Carl (?-1918) decided to get rid of his Dutch estate.

=== Hermanussen ===
In November 1903 Aldendriel was sold for 33,000 guilders. This was before Well Castle was sold. The new owners were W. Verstraten and J. Hermanussen. In 1906 a Roman Catholic boarding school for boys was established in some of the rooms of Aldendriel Castle. In 1910 multiple families lived on the castle, and paid rent to Verstraten. In 1930 Hermanussen became the sole owner.

In 1955 there were plans to locate the town hall of Mill at Aldendriel Castle.

=== Recent history ===
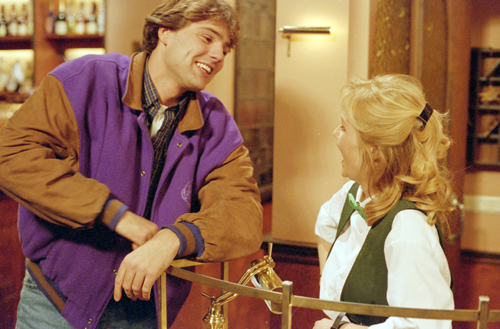
Reinout Oerlemans

In 1962 Jacob Adriaan Oudenaarde (1917-1995) bought the main building of Aldendriel Castle. With some subsidies, he had extensive restoration works done between 1962 and 1966. In 1983 he also bought the outer bailey with the gate. In 2018 a stone plaque was placed to remember the renovation. Jacob Adriaan's daughter Marijke Oudenaarde married dentist Jochem Oerlemans, and the couple lived on the castle grounds. They got three sons. One of these is Reinout Oerlemans (1971), a very successful businessman. He is better known for his role as Arnie Alberts in the Dutch soap opera Goede tijden, slechte tijden.

In 1993 the musician Thijs van Leer lived in a part of the castle. He would live there for about 10 years.

In 2001 Manto Ledeboer became the new owner. He went to live on the castle. The party venue on the outer bailey is hired from him by a hospitality company. It runs a business on the outer bailey since the 1990s.

== Gallery ==
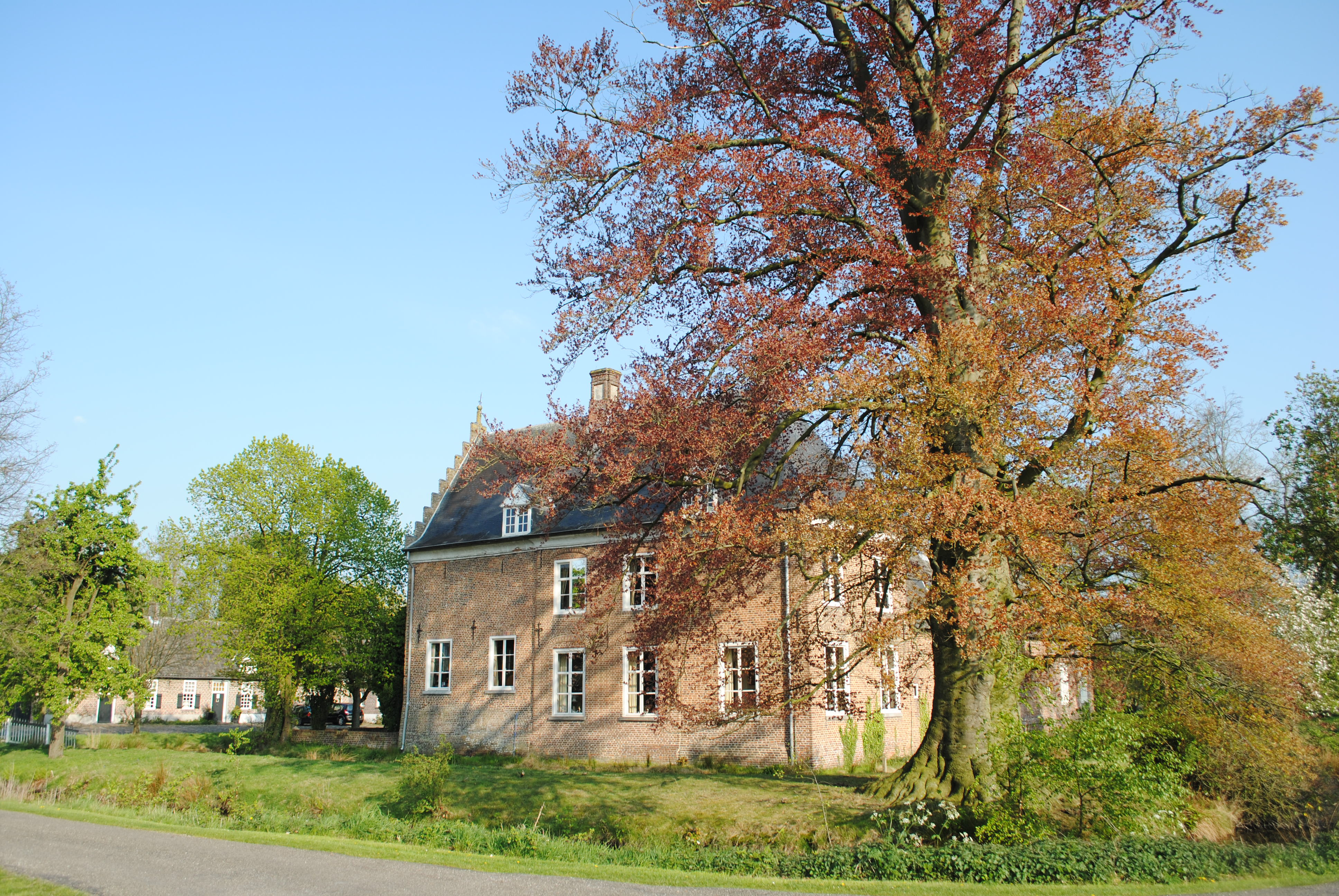
Northern Wing of the castle

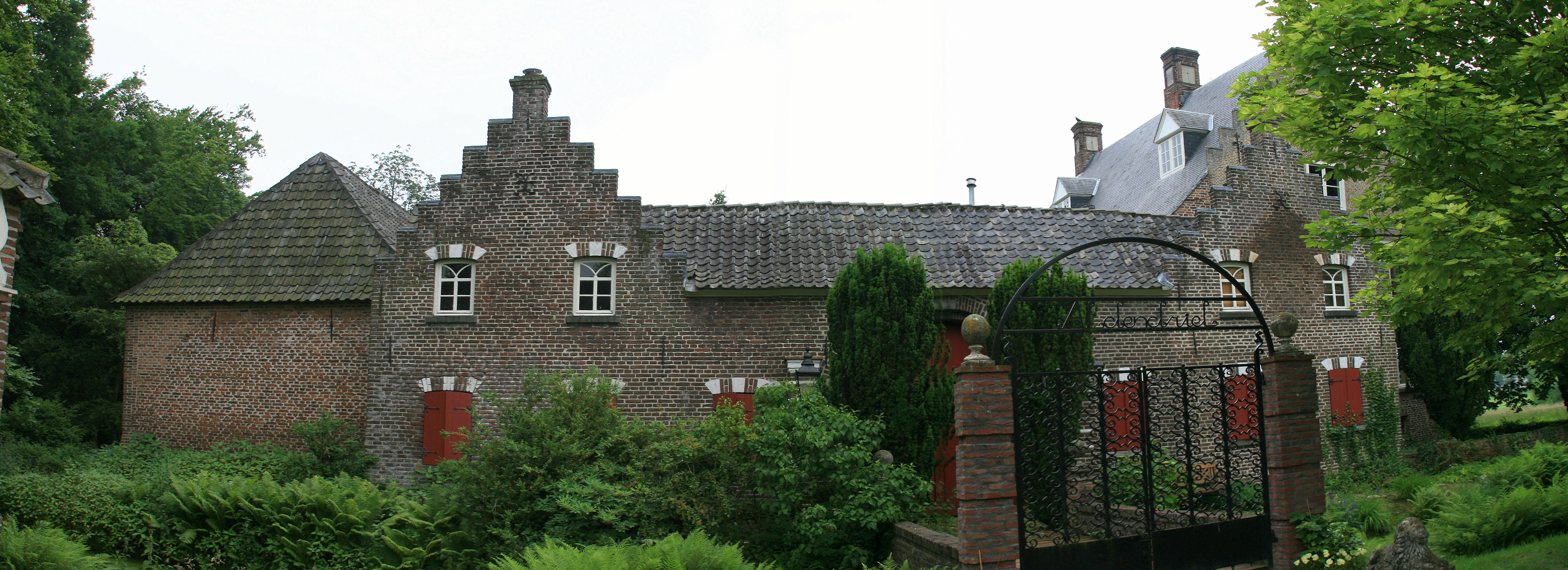
Gate of the main keep

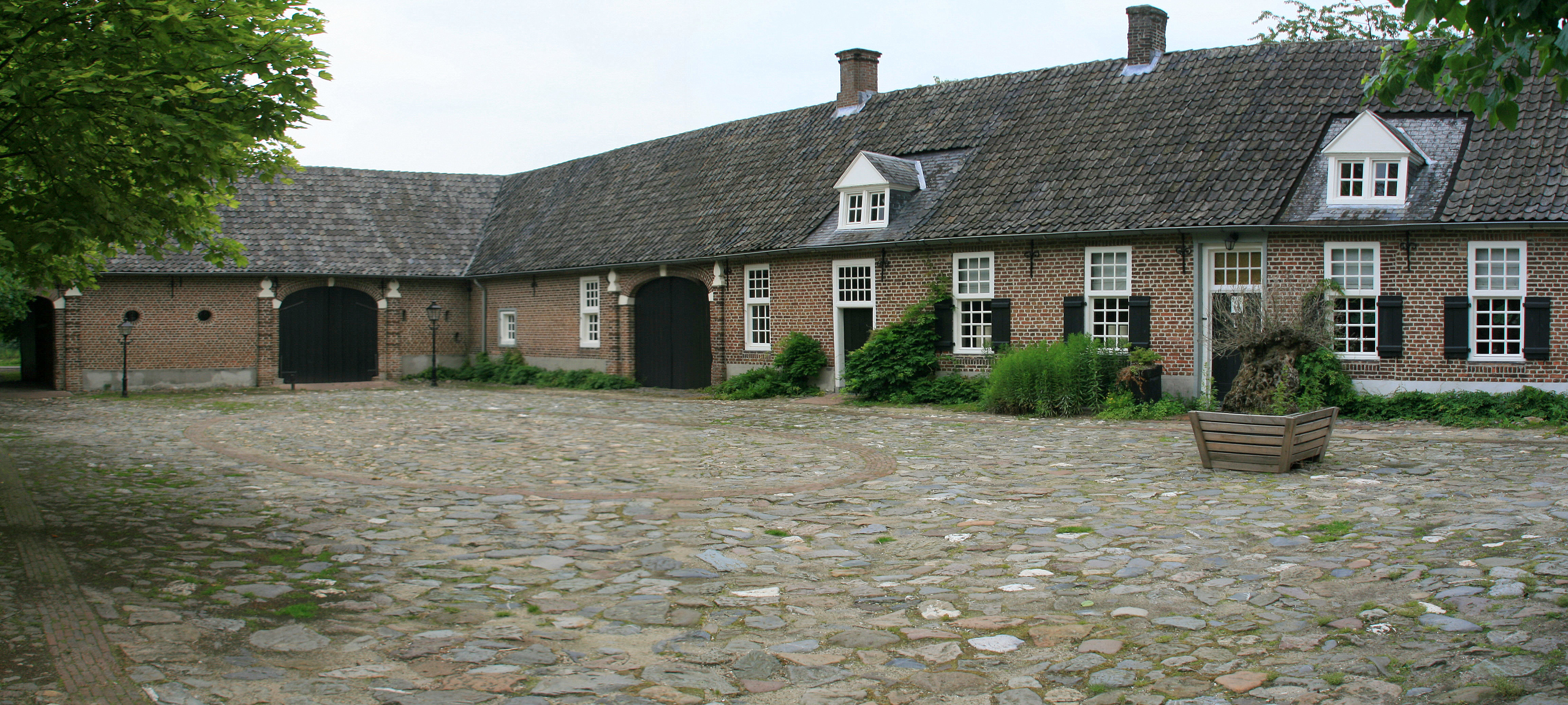
Carriage home on the outer bailey

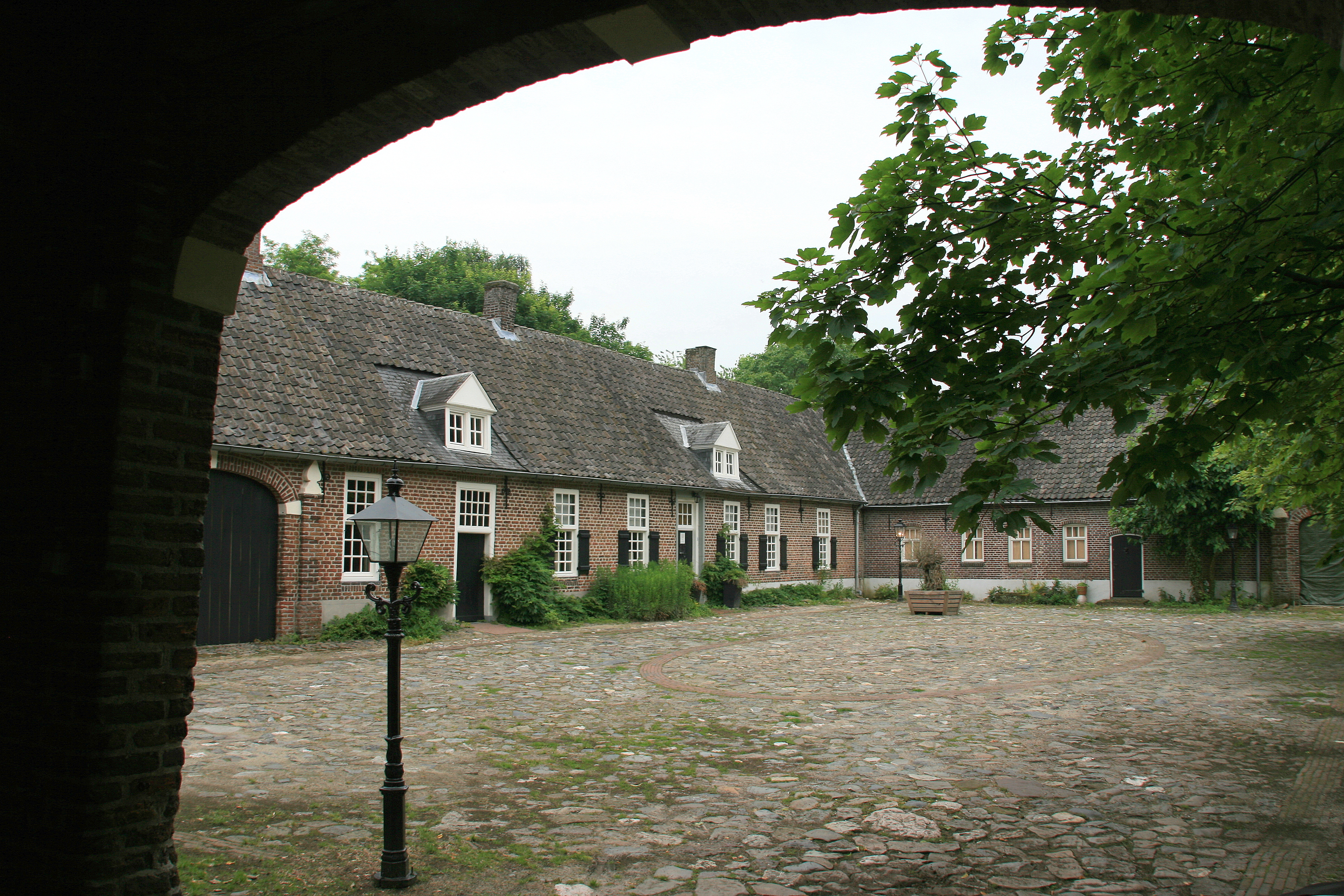
Outer bailey from its main gate

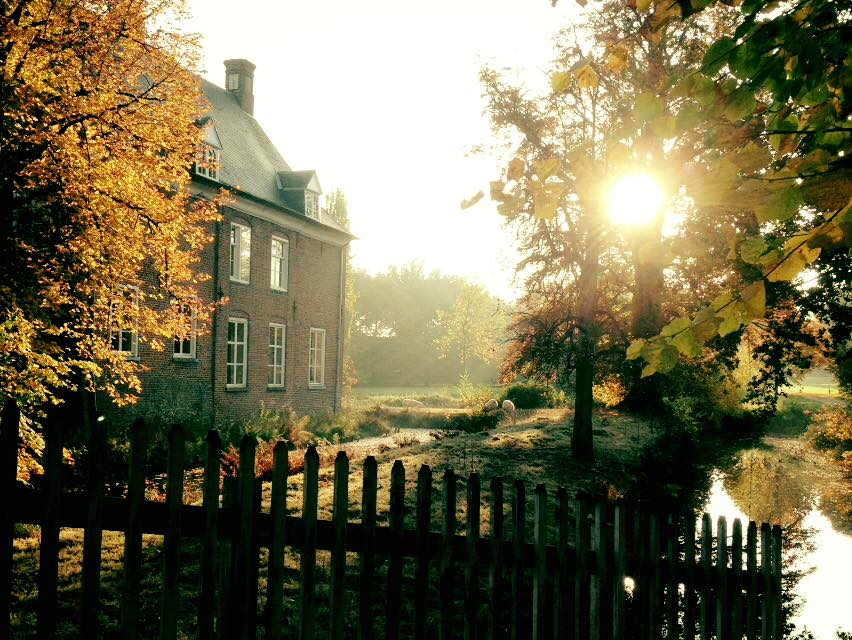
The castle in Fall

== Externe link ==
- www.kasteel-aldendriel.nl
- History Society Nepomuk Boxmeer
- www.bhic.nl/ontdekken/verhalen/kasteel-aldendriel
