= Henry Milling =

British Army officer (died 1822)

Lieutenant Colonel Henry Milling (died 30 December 1822) was a British Army officer who fought in the Napoleonic Wars.

== Biography ==
Milling was commissioned a lieutenant in the 81st Regiment of Foot in 1801. He served with them in the Peninsular War and was severely wounded at the Battle of Corunna (16 January 1809).

In 1815 Milling was present on the Waterloo Campaign with the 2/81st Foot, but did not fight at the Battle of Waterloo, instead the 2/81st Foot remind on garrison duty in Brussels guarding the British Army's pay chest.

On 18 August 1819 Milling was promoted to lieutenant colonel. In 1822 Milling, from 81st Foot, was gazetted to the 93rd Foot, but retired a few months afterwards without having joined his new regiment. He died on 30 December 1822.

== Family ==
Henry Milling was the brother of John Milling, of Shanlis, Ardee, County Louth.
