= Mill, Netherlands =

Mill
- Village
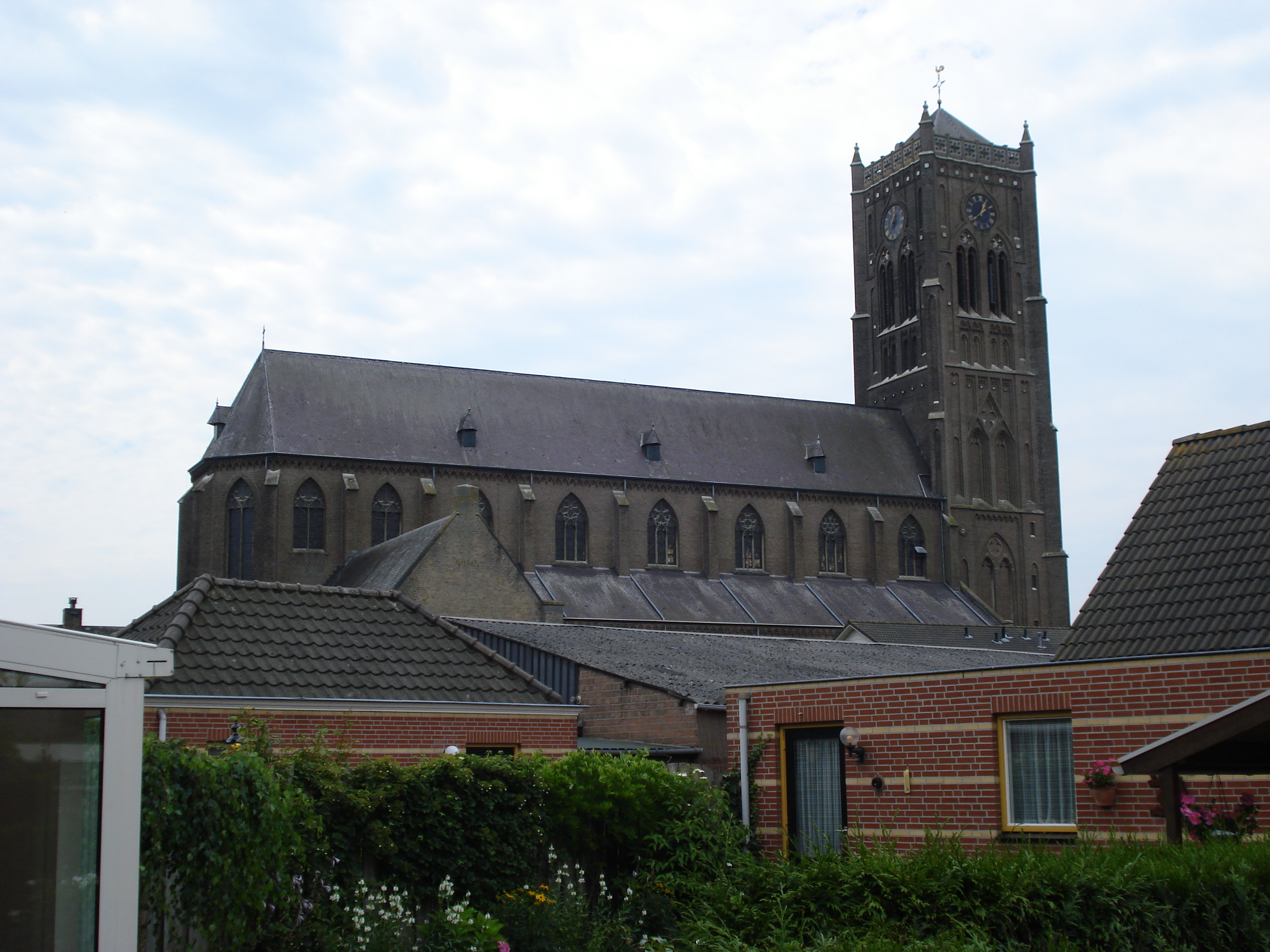
- St. Willibrord church

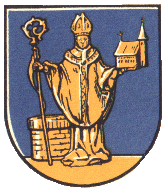
- Coat of arms

- Location in the province of North Brabant in the Netherlands Mill (Netherlands)
- Coordinates: 51°41′12″N 5°46′51″E
- Country: Netherlands
- Province: North Brabant
- Municipality: Land van Cuijk

Area
  - Total: 21.39 km^{2} (8.26 sq mi)
- Elevation: 14 m (46 ft)

Population (2021)
  - Total: 6,210
  - Density: 290/km^{2} (752/sq mi)
- Time zone: UTC+1 (CET)
  - Summer (DST): UTC+2 (CEST)
- Postal code: 5450, 5451
- Dialing code: 0485

Mill is a village in the south of the Netherlands, located in the municipality of Land van Cuijk, North Brabant. Mill is known from the Battle of Mill, a two-day fight during the German invasion of the Netherlands in 1940. On 1 January 2006, Mill had 6,049 inhabitants and was the capital village of the municipality.

== History ==
The name Mill is not clearly derivable from history, although it is more or less clear that the village originates at least from 1166, under the name Millen or Mylle.

In Roman times there was a population center west of the current village center. In the 11th and 12th centuries people settled near some brooks on the western high ride of the Land van Cuijk. The Lords of Cuijk had quite some possessions in the area. They were closely involved in the foundation of Mariënweerd abbey. During the 14th century, Mill became a village with its own schepenbank (municipal council and lower court). The seal of the schepenbank displayed the image of Willibrord, which is still in the municipal coat of arms.

In 1128 the Norbertine abbey of van Mariënweerd in Beesd already owned lands in Mill, and these possessions steadily increased. In 1323 the monastery got the jus patronatus of Mill from Jan Boc de Meere Lord of Boxmeer. In 1326 Mill became a parish dedicated to Willibrord. Later several parishes became independent from Mill: Wanroij in 1559, Sint Hubert in 1796 and Wilbertoord in 1962.

During World War II the Battle of Mill started on 10 May 1940, only 30 minutes after the start of hostilities. The German army surprised the Dutch defenders by driving an armored train through the Peel-Raam Line, and unloading troops at Zeeland village behind the line. These then attacked the Dutch from the rear. The surprise failed because the Germans were unaware that the defenders had received some antique artillery shortly before.

== Attractions ==
The church of Mill has been destroyed multiple times. In 1648 it was expropriated by the Protestants. In 1820 the Catholic church got it back. Soon after, it was demolished. A successor church was demolished in 1879. The current church was started in 1877 and consecrated in 1881.

Aldendriel Castle is in Mill. North of Mill is Tongelaar Castle.

== Notable people ==
- Father Chrysanthus
- Kees Bastiaans
- Reinout Oerlemans

== Gallery ==
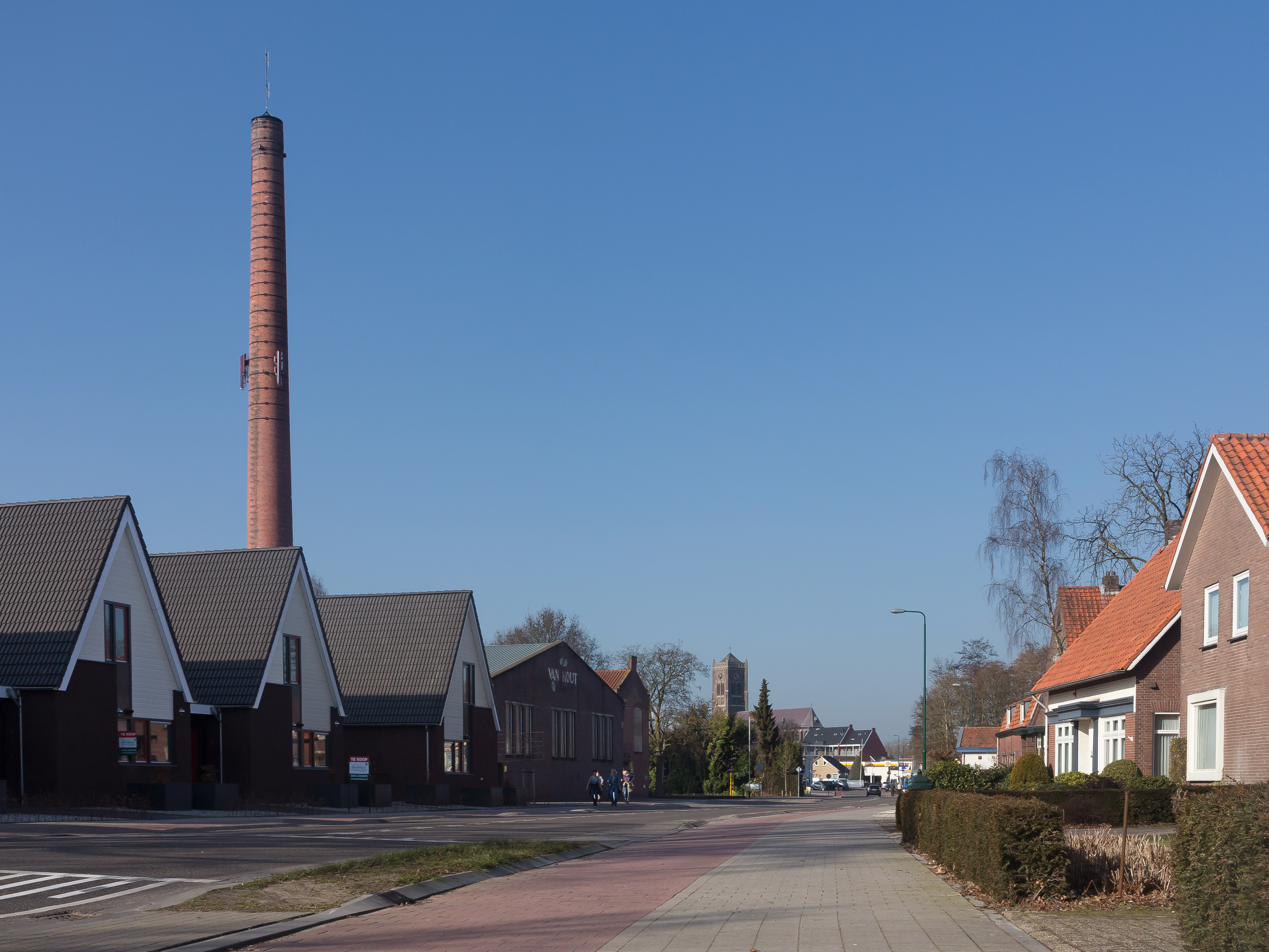
Stone chimney from former Van Hout factory

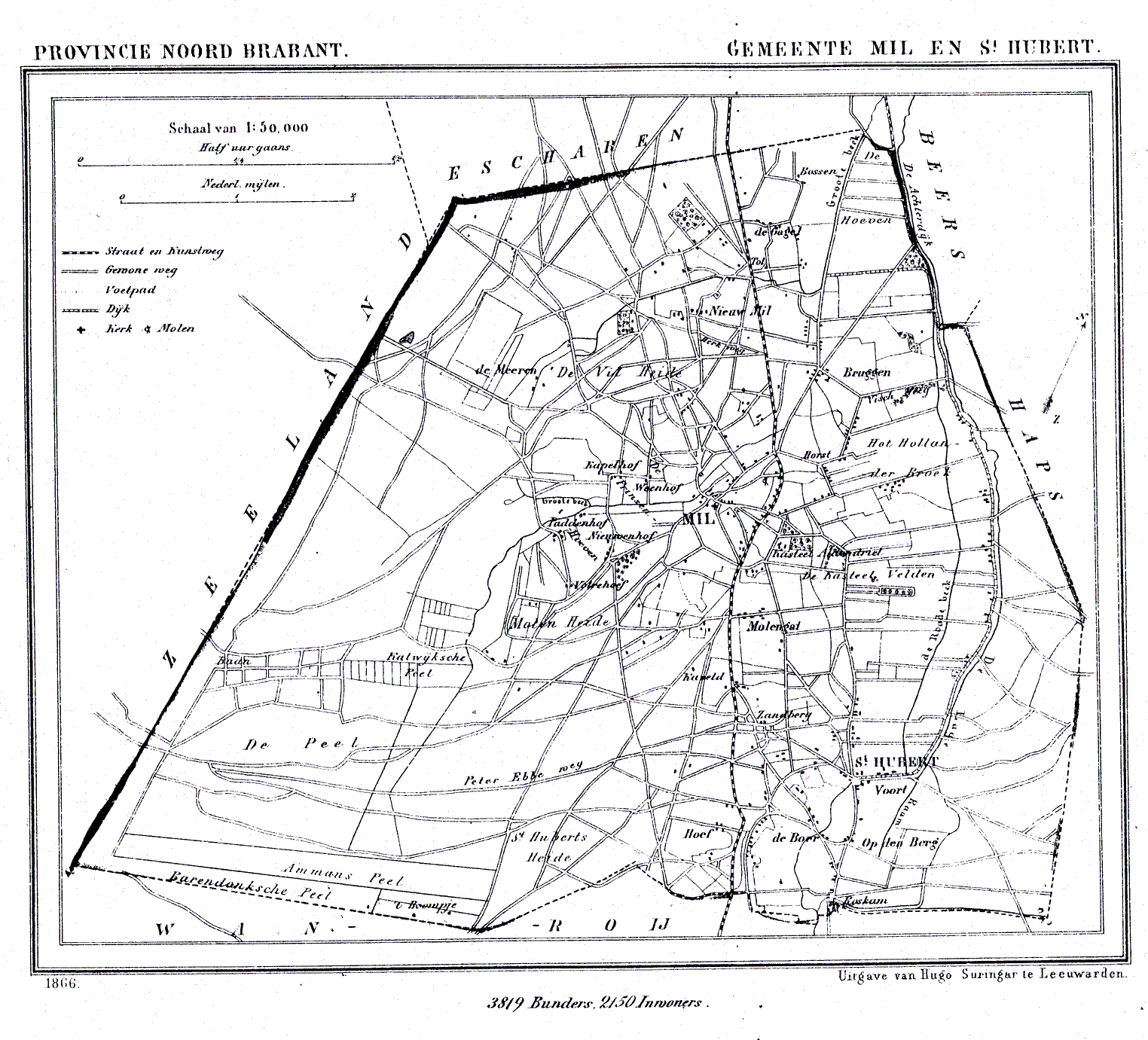
Map of Mill in 1866

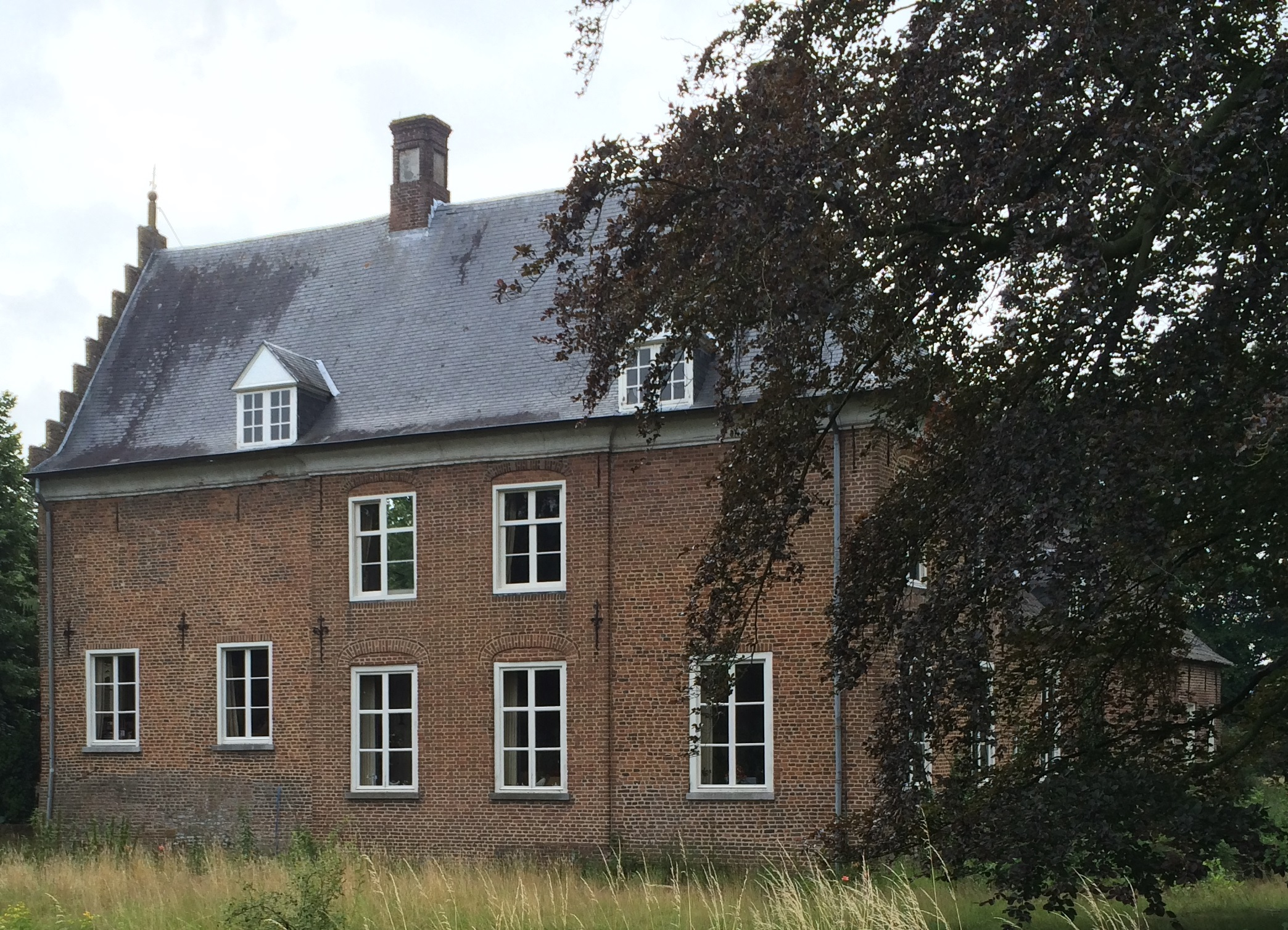
Aldendriel Castle

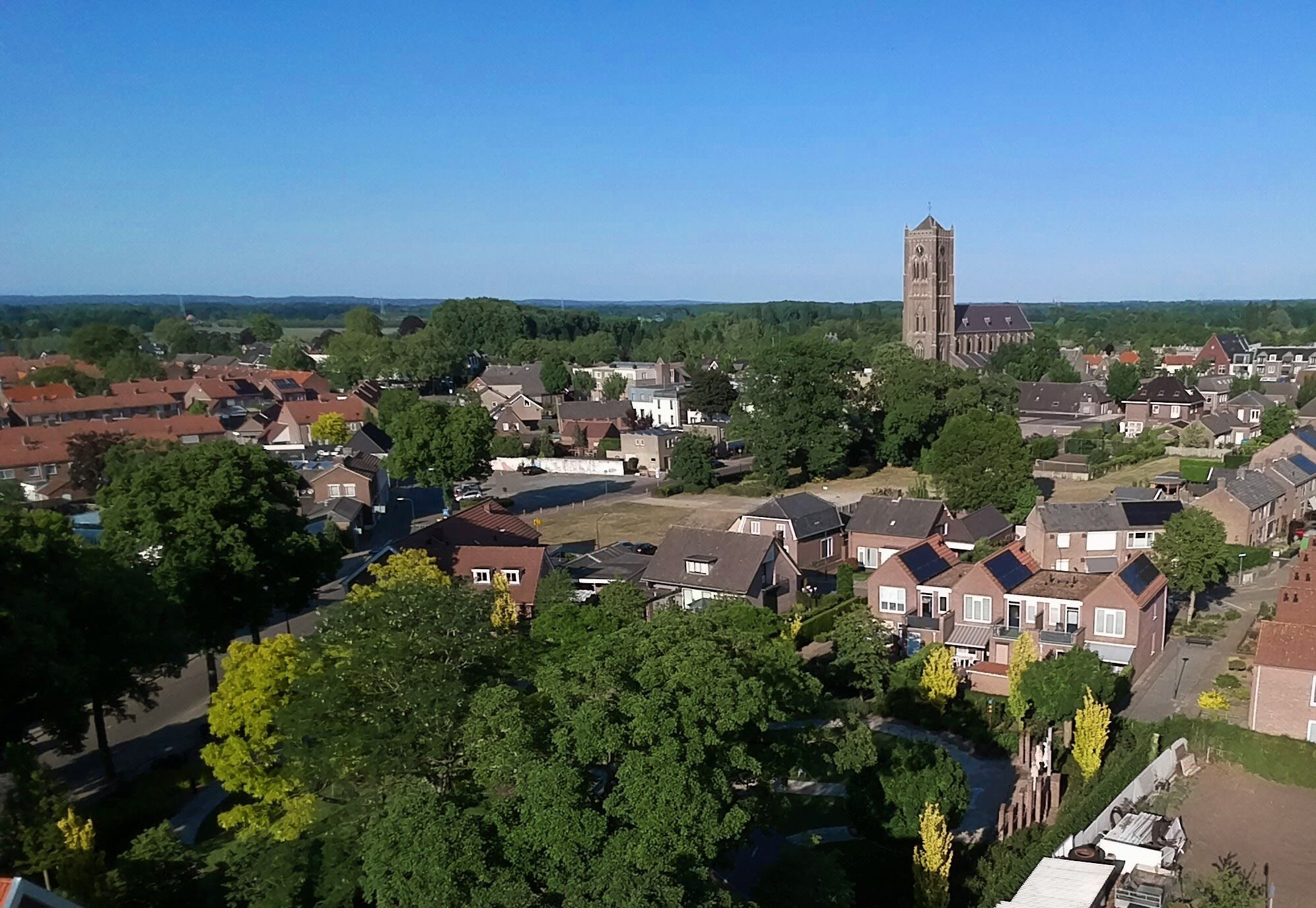
Aerial view
