= Christian demonology =

Study of demons from a Christian point of view

The Torment of Saint Anthony (1488) by Michelangelo, depicting Saint Anthony being assailed by demons

Christian demonology is the study of demons from a Christian point of view. It is primarily based on the Bible (Old and New Testaments), the interpretation of these scriptures, the writings of early Christian philosophers, hermits, and the associated traditions and legends incorporated from other beliefs.

== Origins ==
In some Christian traditions, the deities of other religions are interpreted as demons. Paul states this explicitly in 1 Corinthians 10, forbidding idolatrous libations. The evolution of the Devil in Christianity is such an example of early ritual and imagery that showcase evil qualities, as seen by the Christian churches.

Since Early Christianity, demonology has developed from a simple acceptance of the existence of demons to a complex study that has grown from the original ideas taken from Jewish demonology and Christian scriptures. Christian demonology is studied in depth within the Roman Catholic Church, although many other Christian churches affirm and discuss the existence of demons.

The Catholic Encyclopedia, referring to the many false beliefs and erroneous teachings on the subject, says of demonology, "A daemonibus docetur, de daemonibus docet, et ad daemones ducit" ('It is taught by the demons, it teaches about the demons, and it leads to the demons').

According to the Book of Enoch (which is currently only canonical in the Eritrean and Ethiopian Orthodox Churches but was referred to by the early Church Fathers), the disembodied spirits of the Nephilim are demons. Enoch explains:

And now, the giants, who are produced from the spirits (Angels) and flesh, shall be called evil spirits upon the earth, and on the earth shall be their dwelling. Evil spirits have proceeded from their bodies; because they are born from men and from the holy Watchers is their beginning and primal origin; they shall be evil spirits on earth, and evil spirits shall they be called. [As for the spirits of heaven, in heaven shall be their dwelling, but as for the spirits of the earth which were born upon the earth, on the earth shall be their dwelling.] And the spirits of the giants afflict, oppress, destroy, attack, do battle, and work destruction on the earth, and cause trouble: they take no food, but nevertheless hunger and thirst, and cause offences. And these spirits shall rise up against the children of men and against the women, because they have proceeded from them. From the days of the slaughter and destruction and death of the giants, from the souls of whose flesh the spirits, having gone forth, shall destroy without incurring judgement.

—I Enoch 15:8–12, 16:1 R. H. Charles

== Number ==
In 1467, Alonso de Espina asserted that the number of demons was 133,316,666. This idea that one third of the angels turned into demons seems to be due to an eisegesis of the Book of Revelation 12:3–9.

Johann Weyer, in his Pseudomonarchia Daemonum (1583), after a complicated system of hierarchies and calculations, estimated the number of demons as 4,439,622, divided into 666 legions, each legion composed of 6,666 demons, and all of them ruled by 66 hellish dukes, princes, kings, etc. The Lesser Key of Solomon (17th century) copied the division into legions from Pseudomonarchia Daemonum but added more demons, and so more legions. It is suggestive that both Spina and Weyer used 666 and other numbers composed by more than one 6 to calculate the number of demons (133,316,666 demons, 666 legions, 6,666 demons in each legion, 66 rulers). Therefore, the demonic number was 666.

Gregory of Nyssa, in the 4th century, believed in the existence of male and female demons and supported the idea that demons procreated with other demons and with human women. Other scholars supported the idea that they could not procreate and that the number of demons was constant.

== Characteristics ==
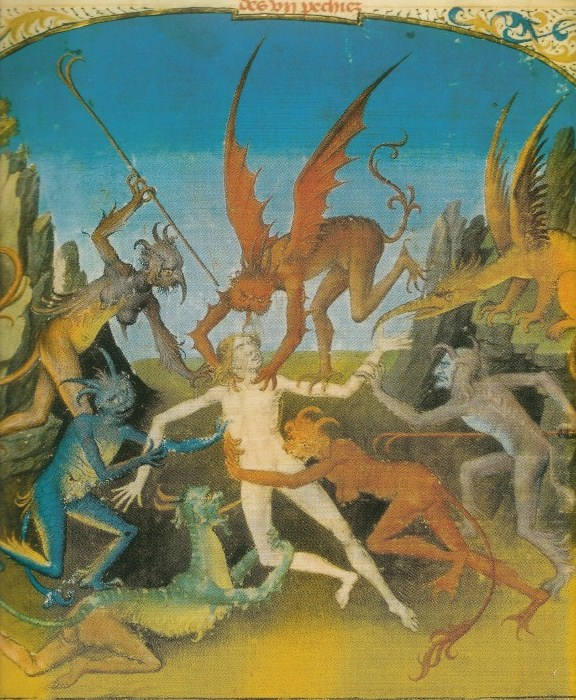
Man being attacked by the 7 deadly devils

In Christian tradition, demons are fallen angels. Demons are not omniscient, but each one has a specific knowledge (sometimes on multiple subjects). Their power is limited to that which God allows, so they are not omnipotent. No reference has been made about omnipresence, so it is unclear if they can be in different places at the same time, but according to the tradition of the medieval witches' Sabbath, two conclusions can be reached: either the Devil can be in different places at the same time, or he sends an emissary in his name.

Christian demonology states that the mission of the demons is to induce humans to sin. Demons are also believed to try to tempt people into abandoning the faith, committing heresy or apostasy, remaining or turning into Pagans, or venerating idols (the Christian term for cult images). It is also believed that demons torment people during their life or through demonic possession or simply by showing themselves before persons to frighten them or by provoking visions that could induce people to sin or to be afraid.

In the Gospel of Luke, it is stated that demons walk "arid places", and finding no rest return to their previous home.

When an impure spirit comes out of a person, it goes through arid places seeking rest and does not find it. Then it says, 'I will return to the house I left.' When it arrives, it finds the house swept clean and put in order. Then it goes and takes seven other spirits more wicked than itself, and they go in and live there. And the final condition of that person is worse than the first.

=== Appearance ===
Demons and angels in general can take any desired appearance, even that of an "angel of light".

And no wonder! Even Satan disguises himself as an angel of light. 15 So it is not strange if his ministers also disguise themselves as ministers of righteousness. Their end will match their deeds.

— 2 Corinthians, 11:14-15

Do not neglect to show hospitality to strangers, for by doing that some have entertained angels without knowing it.

— Hebrews, 13:2

Nevertheless, they were generally described as ugly and monstrous beings by Christian demonologists. Many of these descriptions have inspired famous painters like Luca Signorelli, Hieronymus Bosch, Francisco Goya, the artist who made the drawings for the Dictionnaire Infernal, and others. Incubi and succubi are described as looking attractive in order to accomplish their mission of seduction. The Devil in particular has been popularly symbolized as various animals, including the serpent, the goat and the dragon.

The idea that demons have horns seems to have been taken from chapter 13 of the Book of Revelation.

And I saw a beast rising out of the sea, with ten horns and seven heads, and on its horns were ten diadems, and on its heads were blasphemous names.

— Revelations, 13:1

Then I saw another beast that rose out of the earth; it had two horns like a lamb, and it spoke like a dragon.

— Revelation, 13:11

This idea has also been associated with the depiction of certain ancient gods like Moloch and the shedu, which were portrayed as bulls, men with bulls' heads, or men wearing bull horns as a crown.

Albertus Magnus and Thomas Aquinas wrote that demons and the hierarchy of angels are created by God with the same non–material substance. The incorporeality is related to their nature, eternal and unchangeable across the centuries.

In Malleus Maleficarum, Heinrich Kramer wrote that demons can take the form of children, and that in this form, they are very heavy, constantly ill and do not grow.

Poets such as Geoffrey Chaucer associated the color green with the Devil, although in modern times the color is red.

Henry Boguet and some English demonologists of the same epoch asserted that witches and warlocks confessed (under torture) that demons' bodies were icy. During the 17th century, this belief prevailed.

=== Sexuality ===
Demons are generally considered sexless as they have no physical bodies, but different kinds are generally associated with one sex or another. Many theologians agreed that demons acted first as succubi to collect sperm from men and then as incubi to put it into a woman's vagina.

Ulrich Molitor and Nicholas Remy disagreed whether women could be impregnated by demons. Remy thought that a woman could never be fecundated by any being other than a man. Heinrich Kramer (author of the Malleus Maleficarum) adopted an intermediate position; he wrote that demons acted first as succubi and then as incubi, but added the possibility that succubi could receive semen from incubi, but he considered that this sperm could not fecundate women.

Peter of Paluda and Martin of Arles among others supported the idea that demons could take sperm from dead men and impregnate women. Some demonologists thought that demons could take semen from dying or recently deceased men, and thus dead men should be buried as soon as possible to avoid it.

== Possession ==
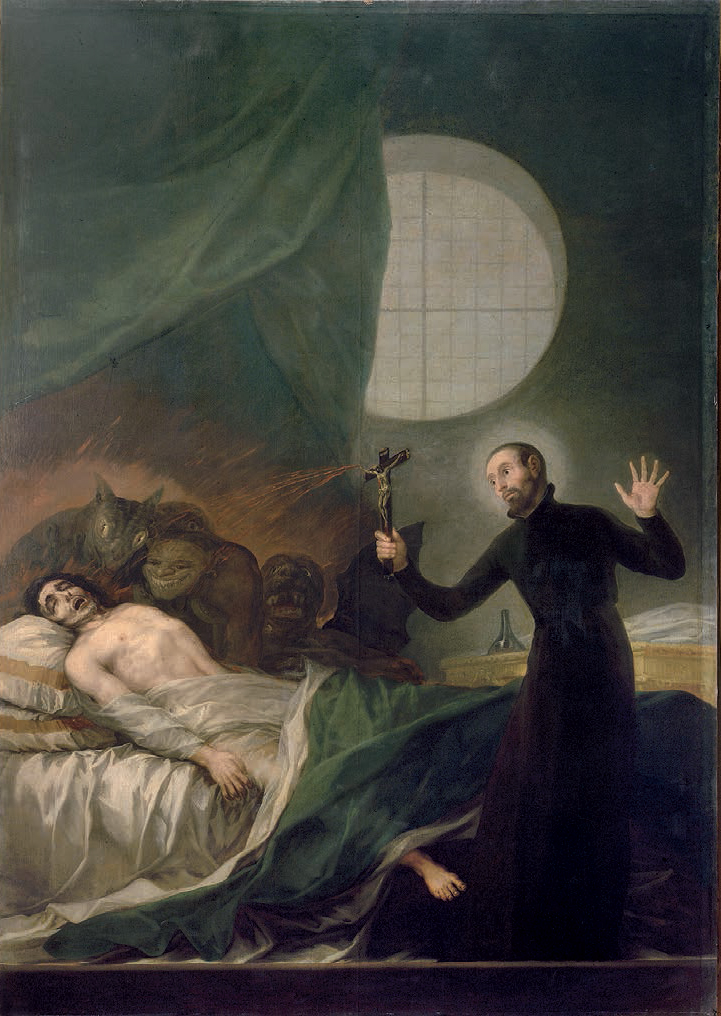
Painting of Saint Francis Borgia performing an exorcism, as depicted by Goya

The incarnation of the demons has been a problem in Christian demonology and theology since early times. A very early form of the incarnation of demons was the idea of demonic possession, trying to explain that a demon entered the body of a person with some purpose or simply to punish that one for some allegedly committed sin. This soon acquired greater proportions, trying to explain how demons could seduce people to have sexual relationships with them or induce them to commit other sins. To Christian scholars, demons did not always have to manifest themselves in a visible and possible tangible form, sometimes it was through possession.

According to the Gospels of Matthew, Mark and Luke demons could be seen and heard, as well as banished.

That evening they brought to him many who were possessed with demons; and he cast out the spirits with a word, and cured all who were sick.

— Matthew 8:16

Just then there was in their synagogue a man with an unclean spirit, and he cried out, "What have you to do with us, Jesus of Nazareth? Have you come to destroy us? I know who you are, the Holy One of God." But Jesus rebuked him, saying, "Be silent, and come out of him!" And the unclean spirit, convulsing him and crying with a loud voice, came out of him. They were all amazed, and they kept on asking one another, "What is this? A new teaching—with authority! He commands even the unclean spirits, and they obey him."

— Mark 1:23–27

When he came to the other side, to the country of the Gadarenes, two demoniacs coming out of the tombs met him. They were so fierce that no one could pass that way. Suddenly they shouted, "What have you to do with us, Son of God? Have you come here to torment us before the time?" Now a large herd of swine was feeding at some distance from them. The demons begged him, "If you cast us out, send us into the herd of swine." And he said to them, "Go!" So they came out and entered the swine; and suddenly, the whole herd rushed down the steep bank into the sea and perished in the water.

— Matthew 8:28–33

Basil of Caesarea also wrote on this subject. He believed that demons, to materialize, had to condense vapors and with them form the body of a person or animal, then entering that body as if it were a puppet to which they gave life. Henry More supported this idea, saying that their bodies were cold due to the solidification of water vapor to form them. Many authors believed that demons could assume the shape of an animal.

Raoul Glaber, a monk of Saint-Léger, Belgium, seems to have been the first in writing about the visit of a demon of horrible aspect in his Historiarum sui temporis, Libri quinque (History of his Time in Five Books).

Augustine thought that demons often were imaginary, but sometimes could enter human bodies, but later accepted the idea of the materialization of demons. Thomas Aquinas followed Augustine's idea, but added that demonic materialization had sexual connotations because demons tried to seduce people to commit sexual sins.

Ambrogio de Vignati, disagreeing with other authors, asserted that demons, besides not having a material body, could not create one, and all what they seemed to do was a mere hallucination provoked by them in the mind of those who had made a diabolical pact or were "victims" of a succubus or incubus, including the sexual act.

== Diabolical symbols ==
The inverted pentagram circumscribed by a circle (also known as a pentacle)

Inspired by the Revelation 13:18, the number 666 (the number of the second beast) was attributed to the Antichrist and to the Devil.

According to medieval grimoires, demons each have a diabolical signature or seal with which they sign diabolical pacts. These seals can also be used by a conjurer to summon and control the demons. The seals of a variety of demons are given in grimoires such as The Great Book of Saint Cyprian, Le Dragon Rouge and The Lesser Key of Solomon.

The pentagram, which has been used with various meanings in many cultures (including Christianity, in which it denoted the five wounds of Christ), is usually considered a diabolical sign when inverted (one point downwards, two points up). Such a symbol may appear with or without a surrounding circle, and sometimes contains the head of a male goat, with the horns fitting into the upper points of the star, the ears into the side points, the beard into the lowest one, and the face into the central pentagon.

An inverted (upside-down) cross (particularly the crucifix) has also been considered a symbol of both the Devil and the Antichrist, although in Catholic tradition a plain inverted cross (without the corpus or figure of Christ) is a symbol of Saint Peter.

== Other views ==
Not all Christians believe that demons exist in the literal sense. There is the view that the New Testament language of exorcism is an example of the language of the day being employed to describe the healings of what today would be classified as epilepsy, mental illness etc.

== See also ==
- Christian angelology
- Classification of demons
- Deliverance ministry
- Demons and animals
- Exorcism
- Fall of man
- List of theological demons
- Necromancy
- Richalmus
- Seven princes of Hell
- Spiritual mapping
- Spiritual warfare
- Territorial spirit
- Unclean spirit
- Walter Wink

== Literature ==
Demonologies from Christian and Occultist perspectives

- Thomas Aquinas, Summa Theologica (1274)
- Nicholas Magni, Tractatus de superstitionibus (1405)
- The Sworn Book of Honorius (13th century)
- Johannes Hartlieb, Buch aller verpoten kunst (1456)
- Heinrich Kramer and Jacob Sprenger, Malleus Maleficarum (1486)
- Martin of Arles, Tractatus de superstitionibus (1515)
- Nicholas Remy, Daemonolatreiae libri tres (1595)
- King James VI and I. Daemonologie (1597)
- Key of Solomon (16th century)
- Ludovico Maria Sinistrari - De Daemonialitate et Incubis et Succubis (1680)
- The Book of Abramelin (Evidence points to the 18th century, although some claim it to be from the 1450s)
- Augustin Calmet, Treatise on the Apparitions of Spirits and on Vampires or Revenants (1749)
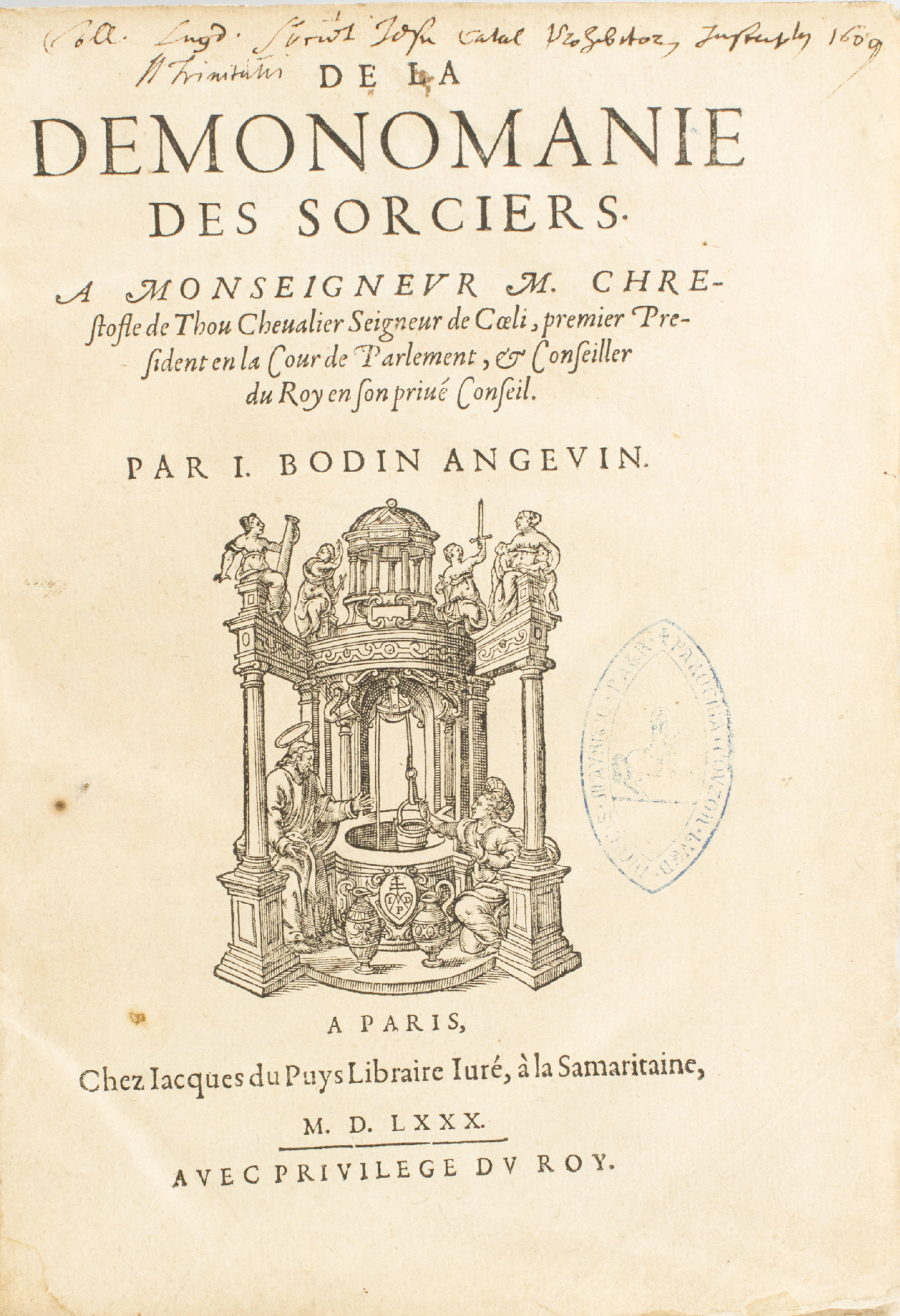
De la démonomanie des sorciers, Jean Bodin

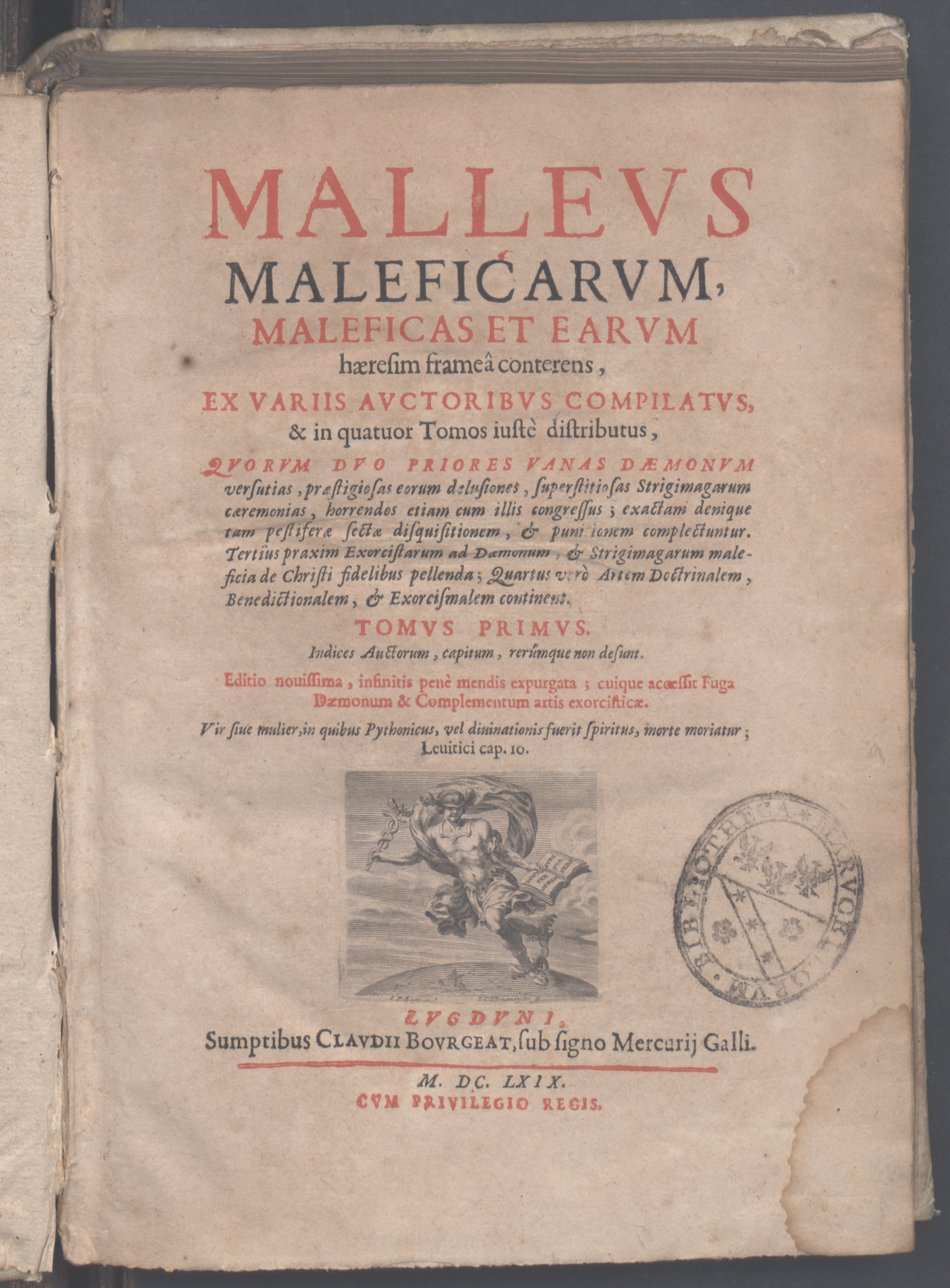
Malleus Maleficarum, Lyon, 1669

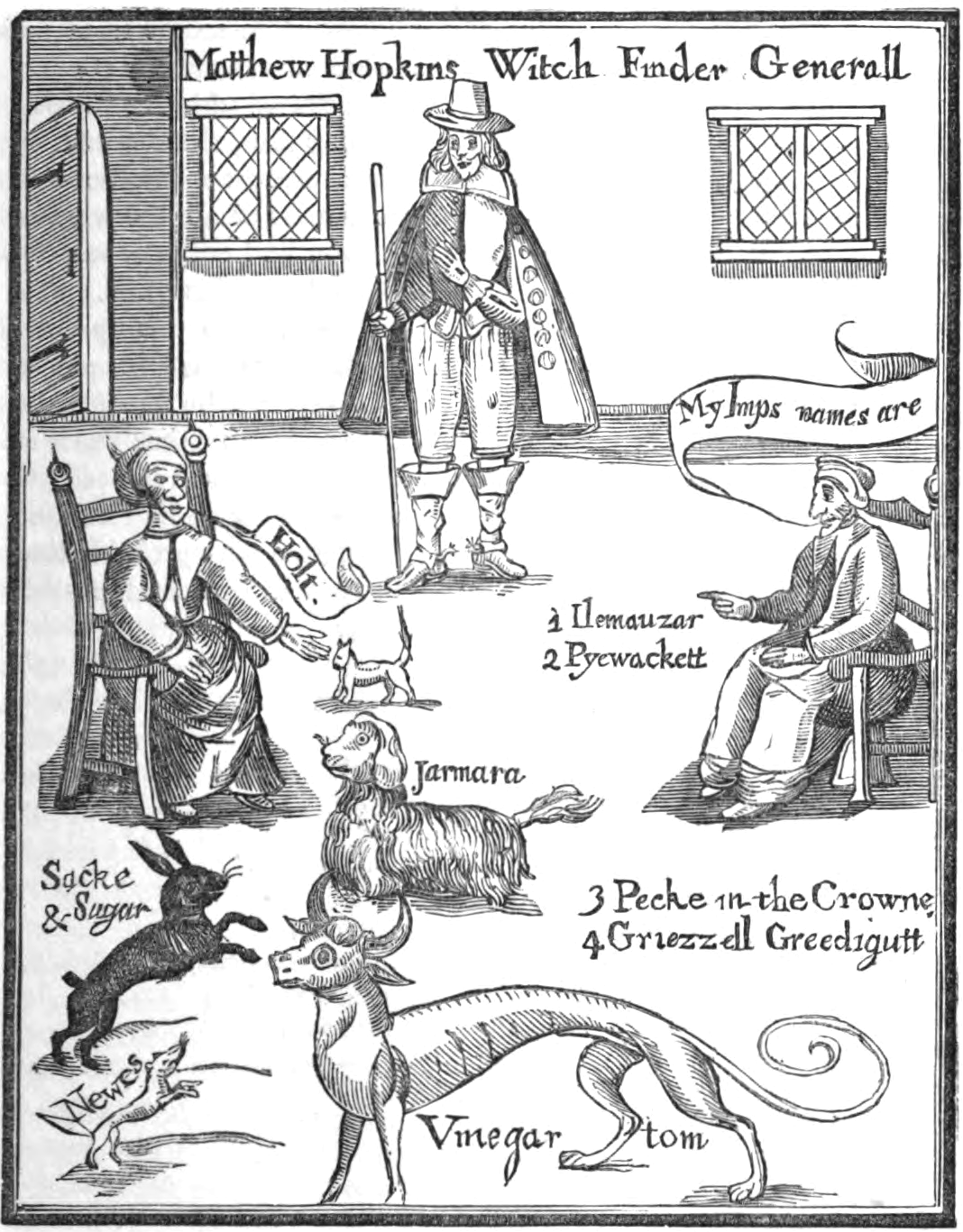
Matthew Hopkins the Witchfinder General
