= Abrahel =

Abrahel is a succubus described by Nicholas Rémy in his work Daemonolatreiae libri tres.

== Rémy's story ==
According to Rémy, Abrahel appeared in 1581 in the village of Dalhem, seduced a man called Pierron and tricked him to kill his own son. After the murder, Pierron regretted what he had done and implored the demon to give life back to his son; the succubus consented but in exchange, demanded the man worship it. When the man's son came back from the dead, he wasn't as intelligent as before; he was also skinnier and slower. A mere year later the young died again, and a nauseating smell started to emanate from the corpse. The father buried the cadaver without hold a funeral.

== Sources ==
- Nicholas Rémy, Demonolatria, Lyon, 1595
- Dom Augustin Calmet e Roland Villeneuve, Dissertation sur les vampires: les revenants en corps, les excommuniés, les oupires ou vampires, brucolaques etc, Editions Jérôme Millon, 1998
