= Dalhem =

Municipality in Liège Province, Wallonia, Belgium

Dalhem Dålem (Walloon)
- Municipality
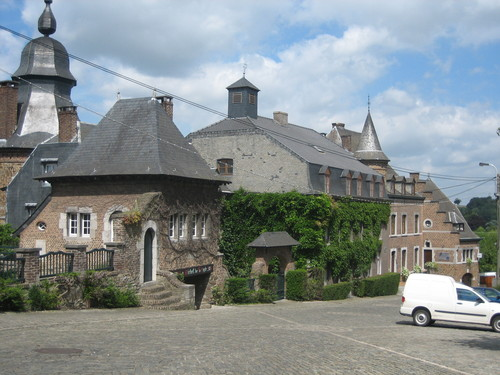

- Flag Coat of arms

- Location of Dalhem in Liège province
- Interactive map of Dalhem
- Location in Belgium
- Coordinates: 50°43′N 05°43′E
- Country: Belgium
- Community: French Community
- Region: Wallonia
- Province: Liège
- Arrondissement: Liège

Government
  - Mayor: Arnaud Dewez (MR)
  - Governing parties: MR, CDH, IC

Area
  - Total: 36.11 km^{2} (13.94 sq mi)

Population (2017)
  - Total: 7,331
  - Density: 203.0/km^{2} (525.8/sq mi)
- Postal codes: 4606-4608
- NIS code: 62027
- Area codes: 04
- Website: www.dalhem.be

Dalhem (French pronunciation: [dalɛm]; Walloon: Dålem) is a municipality of Wallonia located in the province of Liège, Belgium.

On 1 January 2012 Dalhem had a total population of 6,996. The total area is 36.06 km^{2} which gives a population density of 180 inhabitants per km^{2}. The name Dalhem is of Germanic origin and means "place of residence in the valley" (lit. dale home/dale ham).

== Locations in the Municipality ==
The municipality of Dalhem consists of the following districts: Berneau, Bombaye, Dalhem, Feneur, Mortroux, Neufchâteau, Saint-André, and Warsage. The current municipality was formed during the fusion of the Belgian municipalities in 1977. The Château de Wodémont is within the municipality.

== History ==
Already in 1080 a fortress was built in Dalhem on a high rock, where the Berwijn and Bolland rivers merged. Dalhem experienced its first major development since the 12th century, when a few "lords of Voeren" began moving to Dalhem in 1180 and began calling themselves "lords of Dalhem." Then their goods were transferred to the Count of Hochstaden, making Dalhem a county. The town of Dalhem grew into the administrative center and core of the county of Dalhem, next to 's-Gravenvoeren (the original Voeren), where the legal power resided. In 1244 it definitively lost its independence and from then on fell indirectly under the Duchy of Brabant.

In 1239, after the duke had defeated the last count of Dalhem, Dirk van Hochstaden, a treaty was concluded in 1244, whereby Dirk van Hochstaden left Dalhem to Brabant for good. From now on a final bailiff or cross-country would take over the reign in the name of the duke. Together with the Land of Valkenburg and Rolduc, Dalhem was henceforth referred to in the official documents as the 'Lands of Overmaas'. This was sometimes also considered to include Limburg, as a result of which the four lands together received the title 'Province of Limburg'. Until the dissolution of the county of Dalhem in 1797, the town of Dalhem was furthermore the capital of the county and the capital of one of the Dalhem possession.

In 1648 the Netherlands were divided into a Spanish section and the sovereign Dutch Republic. On 26 December 1661 the castle and town of Dalhem became part of the sovereign part of the County of Dalhem (State Partage) as a result of the Partagetraktaat (division treaty) between the Dutch Republic and Spain. Economically, the coal mines around Dalhem were of particular importance to the Dutch, while the place itself provided a good military base against the enemy through its castle. In 1665, Robert van Ittersum built the town hall in Dalhem, which today still houses a Nassau coat of arms with the lion above the gate. The town hall itself underwent several renovations over time (1840, 1927).

On 8 November 1785 Austria and the States General signed the Treaty of Fontainebleau, whereby a large part of the county of Dalhem, including the town of Dalhem, was ceded to Austria by the States General in exchange for parts of Austrian Valkenburg. Dalhem thus became part of the Southern Austrian Netherlands. For many residents this was a liberation. After all, Protestantism imposed too high demands on the Catholic population.

Warsage was one of the first villages to be captured in the German invasion of Belgium at the start of World War I in August 1914. Six Belgian civilians were executed by the German Army in reprisals on the first day of the occupation.

Like the rest of the county, insofar as it was located in the Austrian Netherlands, Dalhem was included in the annexation of the Southern Netherlands by the French Republic in 1797 in the newly formed department of Ourthe; which was later transformed into the province of Liège in the time of the United Netherlands.

== Legend ==
According to Nicolas Rémy, in his work Daemonolatreiae libri tres the succubus Abrahel appeared in Dalhem in the year 1581.

== Sport ==
Rugby union team Coq Mosan play in the village of Berneau in the municipality.

== Notable persons ==
- Albert Thys (1849–1915, in Dalhem), businessman in Belgian Congo
- Henri Francotte (1856–1918, in Dalhem), ancient historian, burgomaster of Dalhem
- Roger Claessen (1941–82, in Dalhem-Weerst), football player

== See also ==
- List of protected heritage sites in Dalhem
