= Martin of Arles =

Spanish theologian and priest

Martinus de Arles y Andosilla (1451 (unattested date) – 1521) was doctor of theology and canon in Pamplona and archdeacon of Aibar, author of a tractatus de superstitionibus, contra maleficia seu sortilegia quae hodie vigent in orbe terrarum (1515), a work on demonology in the context of the Early Modern witch-hunts. Martin believed witches (sorginak) to be particularly numerous among the population of Navarra, and the Basques of the Pyrenees in general. He recommends stern measures of an inquisition against this. His depiction of witchcraft is, however, based on sources predating the Malleus maleficarum, arguing against its simplistic depiction of witchcraft (falsa opinione [...] credentes cum Diana vel Herodia nocturnis horis equitare, vel se in alias creaturas transformare). The work was printed in Paris in 1517, and in Rome in 1559 (142 sextodecimo pages).

The work was not widely received and is now very difficult to find. Nicolas Rémy in his 1595 Demonolatry writes:

"I am aware that Peter of Palude and Martin of Arles have said that when demons go about this work, they, as it were, milk the semen from the bodies of dead men; but this is as ridiculous as the proverbial dead donkey's fart." (trans. Ashwin 1929)

He is interred in the cathedral of Pamplona, his sepulchre bearing the inscription Hic jacet Reverendus Martinus ab Andosilla et Arles, doctor in sacra theologia, canonicus, et archidiaconus vallis de Aibar, in eclesia Pampilonensi qui diem clausit extremum. Anno Domini 1521 die 25 aprilis.
