= Château de Wodémont =

Fortified house in Wallonia, Belgium

Coordinates: 50°42′27″N 05°46′02″E

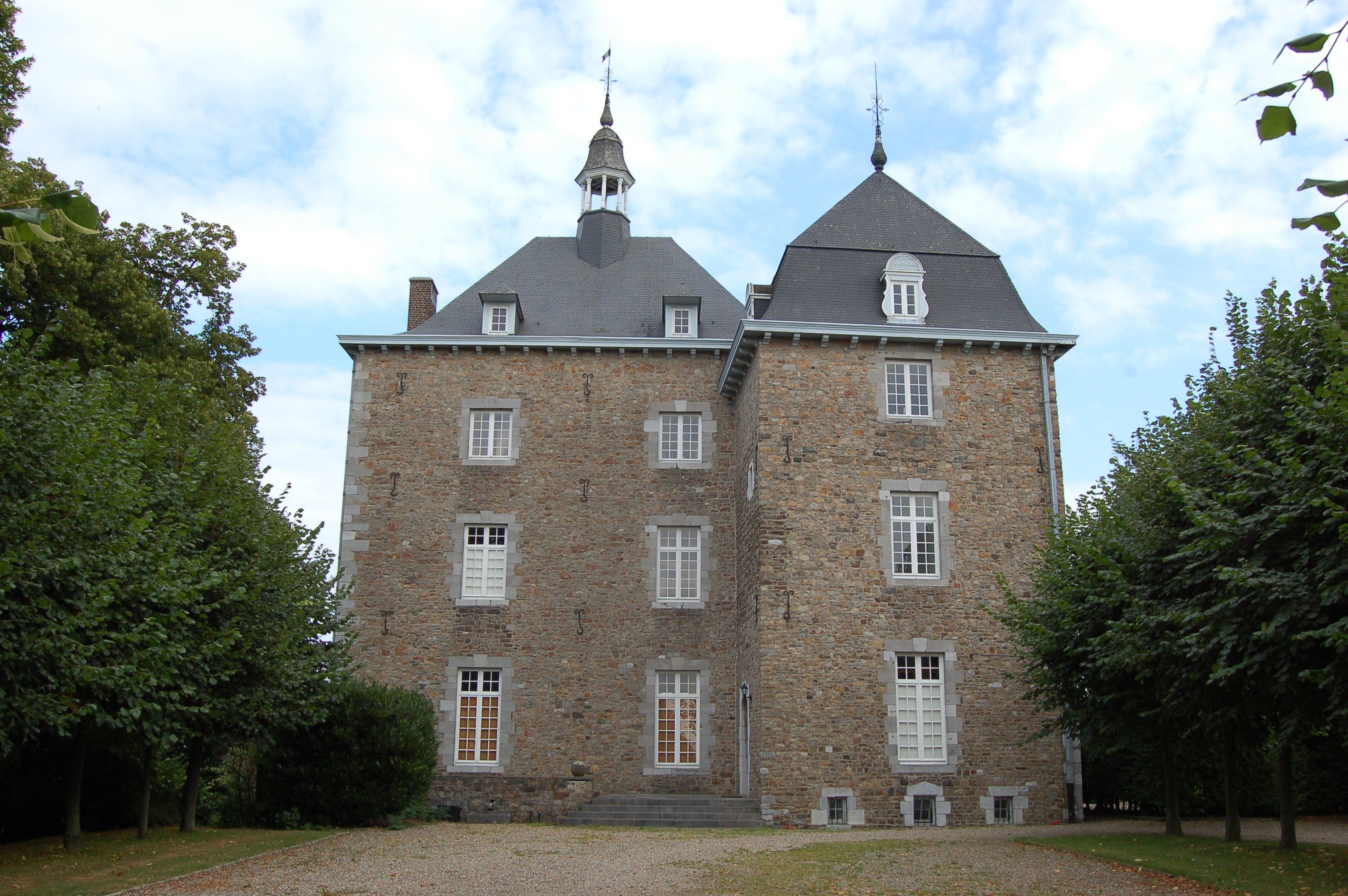
The Château de Wodémont

The Château de Wodémont or Walberg Castle is a fortified house immediately east of the Belgian village of Mortroux within the municipality of Dalhem, Wallonia. It is now used as a private residence.

The Château de Wodémont lies at the top of an incline, on an outcrop of a plateau, and is close to the Berwinne, lying just to the south of the river.

== History ==
Around 1063, the castle was variously named as Waldenborch and Waldenberge. The old tower itself dates from the 11th or 12th century. A Latin document from 1143 mentions the tower using the name of Waldemonte. It had a defensive significance for the Duchy of Limburg because the valley below the castle marked the border between the because the county of Dalhem and the Duchy.

A southern wing was added to the tower in the 17th century while the eastern wing was added in 1860. In 1513, on the death of John of Neufchâteau, the manor and Château de Wodémont passed to Balthasar van Moir Walde.

During the Second World War, the Château was occupied by the Germans and then subsequently by the Americans during the Battle of the Bulge.
