= Grave, Netherlands =

Grave
- City and former municipality
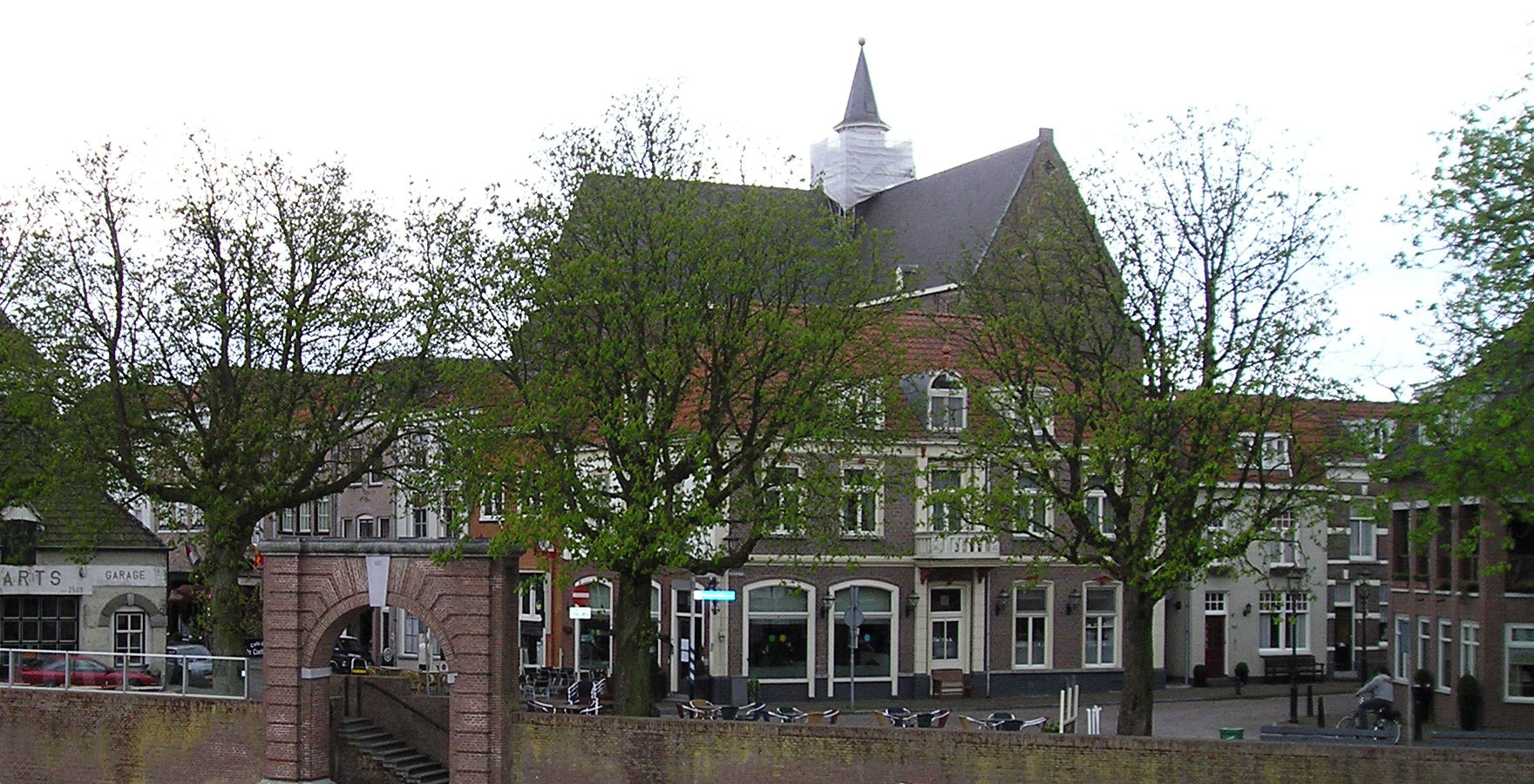
- Grave town centre

- Flag Coat of arms

- Location of the former municipality of Grave in North Brabant

- Location in the province of North Brabant in the Netherlands Grave (Netherlands)
- Coordinates: 51°45′35″N 5°44′27″E
- Country: Netherlands
- Province: North Brabant
- Municipality: Land van Cuijk

Area
  - Total: 3.24 km^{2} (1.25 sq mi)
- Elevation: 10 m (33 ft)

Population (2021)
  - Total: 8,580
  - Density: 2,650/km^{2} (6,860/sq mi)
- Time zone: UTC+1 (CET)
  - Summer (DST): UTC+2 (CEST)
- Postcode: 5360–5361
- Area code: 0486
- Website: www.grave.nl

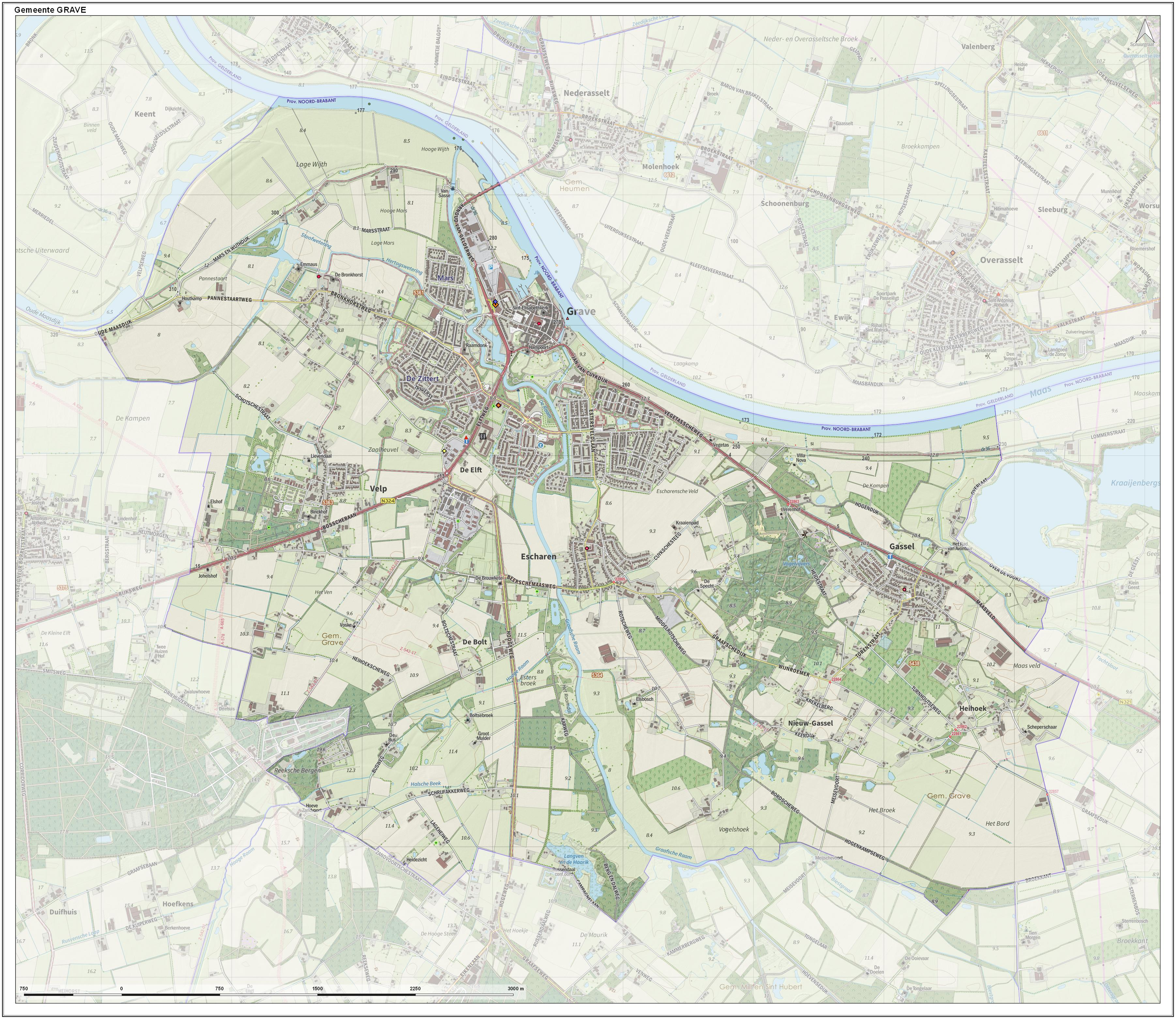
Map of the former municipality of Grave, 2015

Grave (Dutch: [ˈɣraːvə]; formerly De Graaf) is a city and former municipality in the Dutch province of North Brabant. The former municipality had a population of 12,486 in 2021. Grave is a member of the Dutch Association of Fortified Cities.

The former municipality included the following towns: Grave (capital), Velp, Escharen and Gassel.

Grave, Boxmeer, Cuijk, Mill en Sint Hubert, and Sint Anthonis merged into the new municipality of Land van Cuijk on 1 January 2022.

== History ==
Grave received city rights in 1233.

The former municipality of Grave was formed in the Napoleonic era (1810) and coincided with the fortified Grave and immediate surroundings. The history of the town was thus linked to that of the place.

This changed in 1942. Then there was a reclassification place where the municipality Grave was expanded with the previously independent municipalities Velp and Escharen. Moreover, in 1994 the neighboring municipality of Beers was abolished and a part thereof, the parish Gassel, was also added to the municipality Grave.

== Popular attractions ==
Near to Grave lies a bridge, now called John S. Thompsonbrug, built in 1929. It is the northern connection to Gelderland, spanning the river Maas. The bridge was one of the key strategic points in Operation Market Garden; the city was liberated at 17 September 1944, suffering very little damage. The bridge was named in 2004 after Lieutenant John S. Thompson of the US Army's 82nd Airborne Division, who commanded the platoon of the 82nd Airborne Division that captured the bridge.

The Hampoort is the old entrance to the city, and it is still largely intact and can be visited.

== Notable people ==
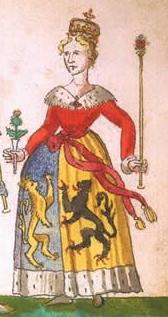
Mary of Guelders

=== Nobility ===
- Mary of Guelders (c. 1434 in Grave – 1463), the queen consort of Scotland as the wife of King James II of Scotland, served as regent of Scotland from 1460 to 1463
- Adolf, Duke of Guelders (1438 in Grave – 1477) Duke of Guelders & Count of Zutphen 1465–1471
- Charles II, Duke of Guelders (1467 in Grave – 1538) member of the House of Egmond who ruled as Duke of Guelders and Count of Zutphen from 1492 to 1538
- Anna van Egmont (1533 in Grave – 1558) a wealthy Dutch heiress, the first wife of William the Silent, Prince of Orange
- Louise van der Nooth (1630s in Grave – 1654) a maid of honour and favorite of Queen Christina of Sweden

=== Others ===
- Johann Weyer (1515 in Grave – 1588) Dutch physician, occultist and demonologist, disciple and follower of Heinrich Cornelius Agrippa
- Charles de Thierry (1793 in Grave – 1864) an adventurer in New Zealand
- Jan Pieter van Suchtelen (1751 in Grave – 1836) general in the Russian army during the Russo-Swedish War (1808–1809)
- Johan Stein (1871 in Grave – 1951) Dutch astronomer and a member of the Society of Jesus

== Images ==
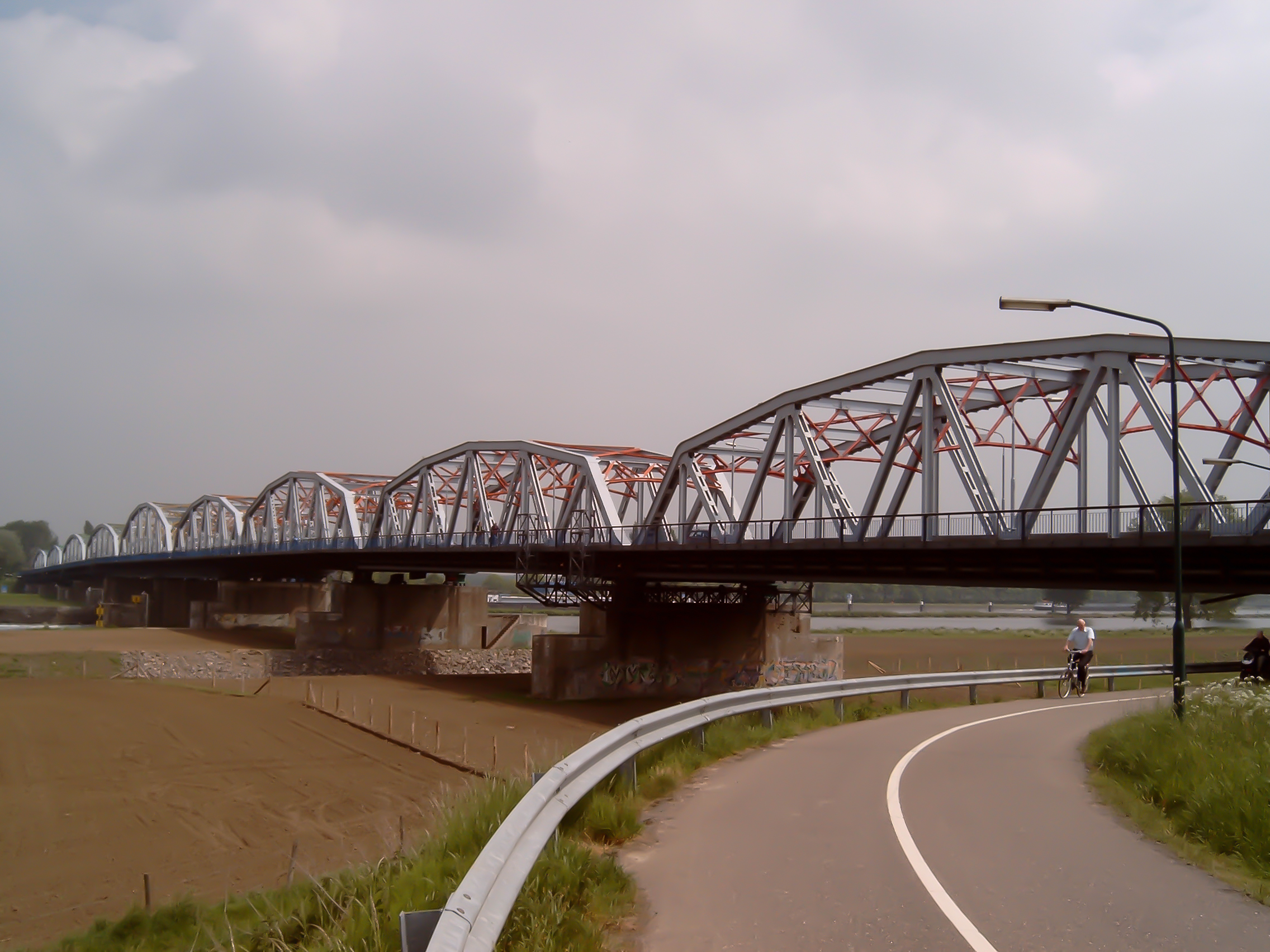
Bridge: John S. Thompsonbrug

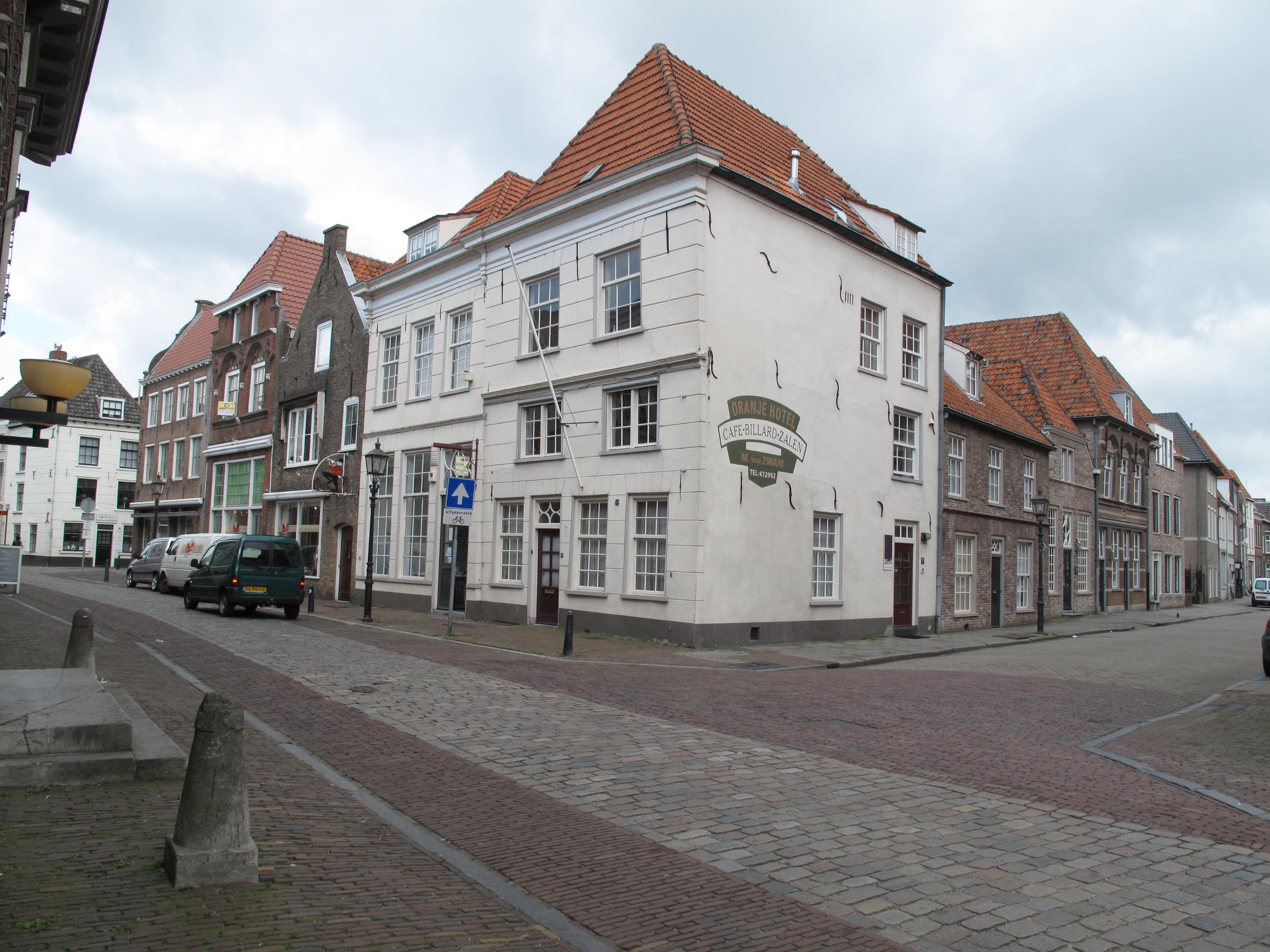
Houses in centre

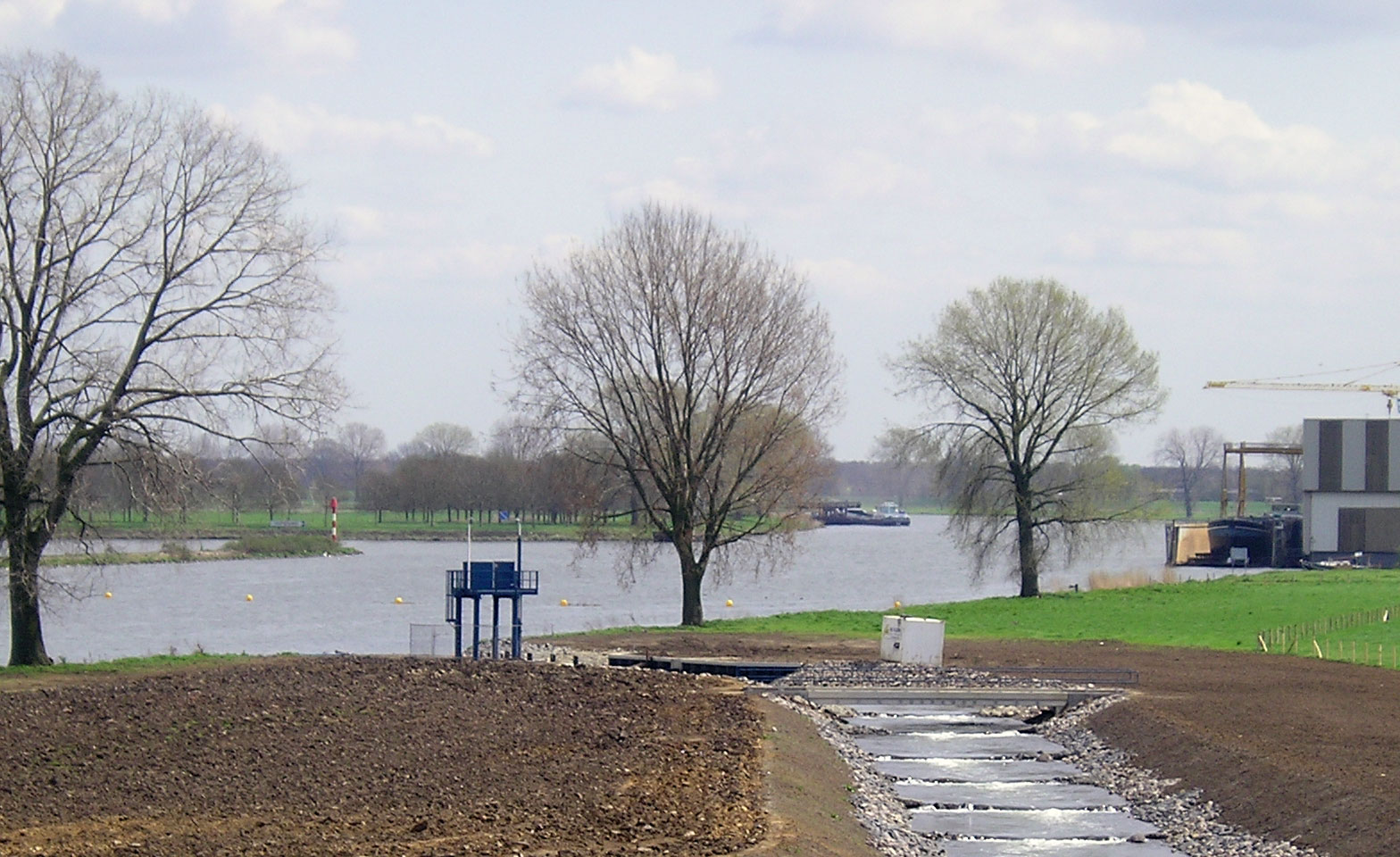
Fish ladder and shipyard

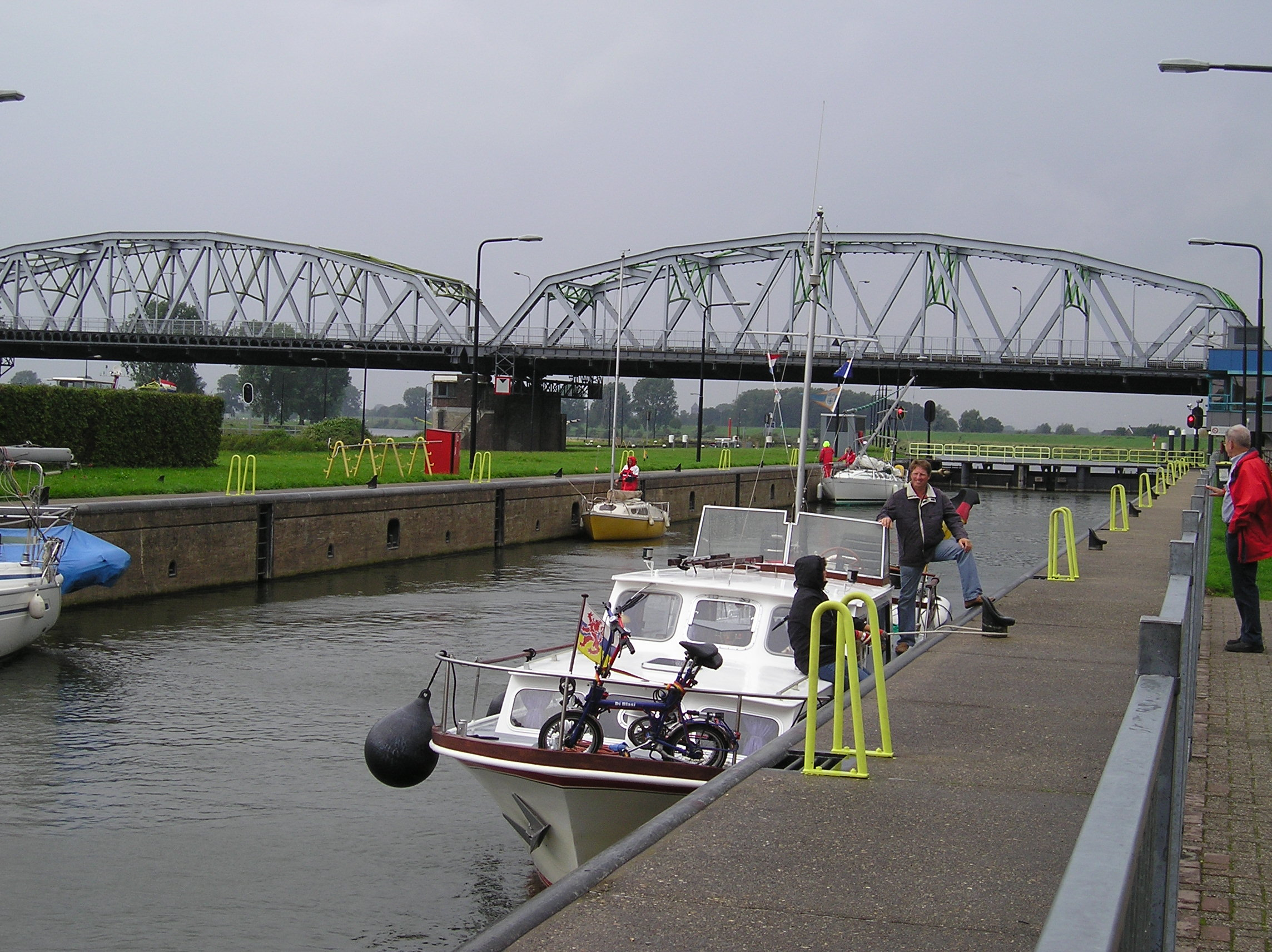
Canal lock

== See also ==
- Apostolic Vicariate of Grave–Nijmegen, former Catholic pre-diocesan jurisdiction
