= List of protected heritage sites in Dalhem =

This table shows an overview of the protected heritage sites in the Walloon town Dalhem. This list is part of Belgium's national heritage.

Object	Year/architect	Town/section	Address	Coordinates	Number^{?}	Image
Castle ruins of the counts of Dalhem ^{(nl)} ^{(fr)}		Dalhem	rue Général Thys, n°29 (M) et alentours (S)	50.712411°N 5.724489°E	62027-CLT-0001-01	Resten (muren) van het kasteel (van de graven van Dalhem)
Castle farm and wall ^{(nl)} ^{(fr)}		Dalhem	rue de l'Eglise 1, Bombaye	50.730358°N 5.739709°E	62027-CLT-0002-01	
Choir of the church of Saint-Jean Baptiste ^{(nl)} ^{(fr)}		Dalhem	Bombaye	50.730556°N 5.743561°E	62027-CLT-0003-01	Het koor en de toren van de kerk van Saint-Jean Baptiste
Saint-Jean Baptiste Church ^{(nl)} ^{(fr)}		Dalhem	Bombaye	50.730501°N 5.743454°E	62027-CLT-0004-01	De kerk van Saint-Jean Baptiste
Old castle of the counts of Borchgrave ^{(nl)} ^{(fr)}		Dalhem	rue des Bruyères, n°5	50.743072°N 5.729411°E	62027-CLT-0005-01	Het oude kasteel van de graven van Borchgrave, momenteel een openbare school
Site of old castle and Presbytry ^{(nl)} ^{(fr)}		Dalhem	Rue de Maestricht 7, Berneau	50.742888°N 5.728274°E	62027-CLT-0006-01	
Chapel 'de la Sainte-Croix' and grave ^{(nl)} ^{(fr)}		Dalhem	Bombaye	50.725766°N 5.738596°E	62027-CLT-0007-01	Het kapel 'de la Sainte-Croix' en het graf
Linden tree named "Appelboom" ^{(nl)} ^{(fr)}		Dalhem	Chemin du Sart	50.716253°N 5.809216°E	62027-CLT-0008-01	De linde genaamd “appelboom” aan de Chemin du Sart
church of St. Pierre ^{(nl)} ^{(fr)}		Dalhem		50.735038°N 5.769297°E	62027-CLT-0009-01	De kerk van Saint-Pierre; toren en schip
Old house ^{(nl)} ^{(fr)}		Dalhem	rue du Tilleul, n°17	50.729565°N 5.741394°E	62027-CLT-0010-01	Huis (gevels en daken)
Old house ^{(nl)} ^{(fr)}		Dalhem	Ri d'Asse 33, Mortroux	50.713547°N 5.751744°E	62027-CLT-0011-01	
Organ of Saint-Servais Church ^{(nl)} ^{(fr)}		Dalhem		50.742551°N 5.730163°E	62027-CLT-0012-01	
Organ of the church of St. Lucy ^{(nl)} ^{(fr)}		Dalhem		50.710897°N 5.753137°E	62027-CLT-0013-01	
'Vallée du Sud' ^{(nl)} ^{(fr)}		Dalhem		50.713304°N 5.773784°E	62027-CLT-0014-01	
Castle Cortils à Mortier ^{(nl)} ^{(fr)}		Dalhem		50.695822°N 5.743459°E	62027-CLT-0016-01	Kasteel (gevels en daken) van Cortils à Mortier (M) en de omgeving gevormd door het kasteel en de omliggende grond aan Mortier, Trembleur et Saint-André (S) (+ BLEGNY/Mortier et Trembleur, Cortils)

== See also ==
- List of protected heritage sites in Liège (province)
