= De praestigiis daemonum =

1563 book by Johann Weyer

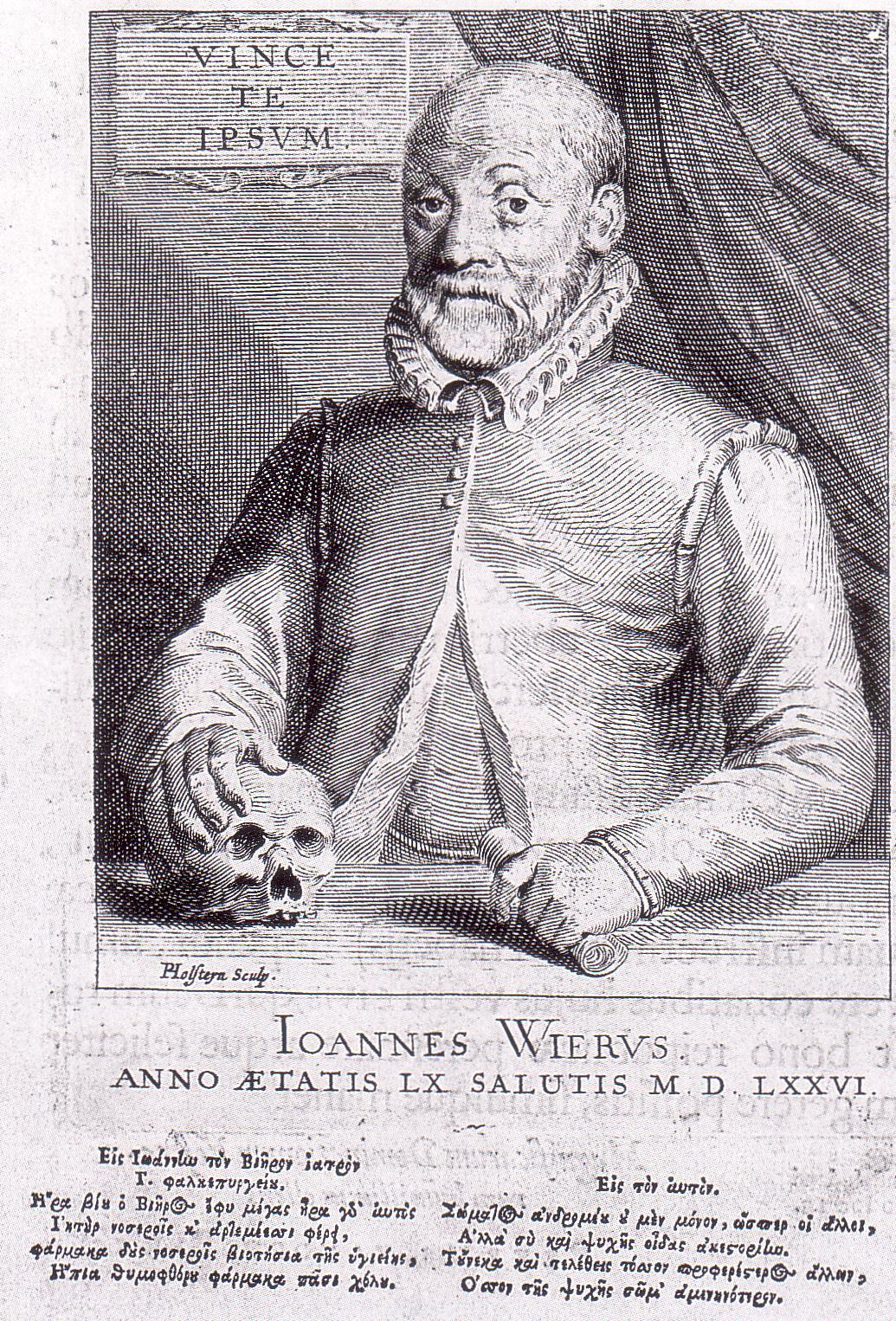
Engraving of Johann Weyer by Pieter Holsteyn II from 1660

De praestigiis daemonum, translated as On the Tricks of Demons, is a book by medical doctor Johann Weyer, also known as Wier, first published in Basel in 1563. The book argues that witchcraft does not exist and that those who claim to practice it are suffering from delusions, which should be treated as mental illnesses, rather than punished as witchcraft. It was influential in the abolishment of witchcraft trials in the Netherlands.

== Synopsis ==
Weyer disagreed with certain contemporaries about the justification of witch-hunting. Weyer believed that most, probably all, cases of alleged witchcraft resulted from delusions of the alleged witch, rather than actual, voluntary cooperation with spiritual evil. In brief, Weyer claimed that cases of alleged witchcraft were psychological rather than supernatural in origin.

The book contains a famous appendix also circulated independently as the Pseudomonarchia Daemonum, a listing of the names and titles of infernal spirits, and the powers alleged to be wielded by each of them. Weyer relates that his source for this intelligence was a book called Liber officiorum spirituum, seu liber dictus Empto Salomonis, de principibus et regibus demoniorum ("The book of the offices of spirits, or the book called Empto, by Solomon, about the princes and kings of demons). Weyer's reason for presenting this material was not to instruct his readers in diabolism, but rather to "expose to all men" the pretensions of those who claimed to be able to work magic, men who "are not embarrassed to boast that they are mages, and their oddness, deceptions, vanity, folly, fakery, madness, absence of mind, and obvious lies, to put their hallucinations into the bright light of day." Weyer's source claimed that Hell arranged itself hierarchically in an infernal court which is divided into princes, ministries and ambassadors.

=== Reception and legacy ===
De Praestigiis has been translated into English, French, and German; it was one of the principal sources of Reginald Scot's sceptical account of witchcraft, The Discoverie of Witchcraft.

== See also ==
- Malleus Maleficarum
- Daemonologie
