= Velp, North Brabant =

Velp
- Village
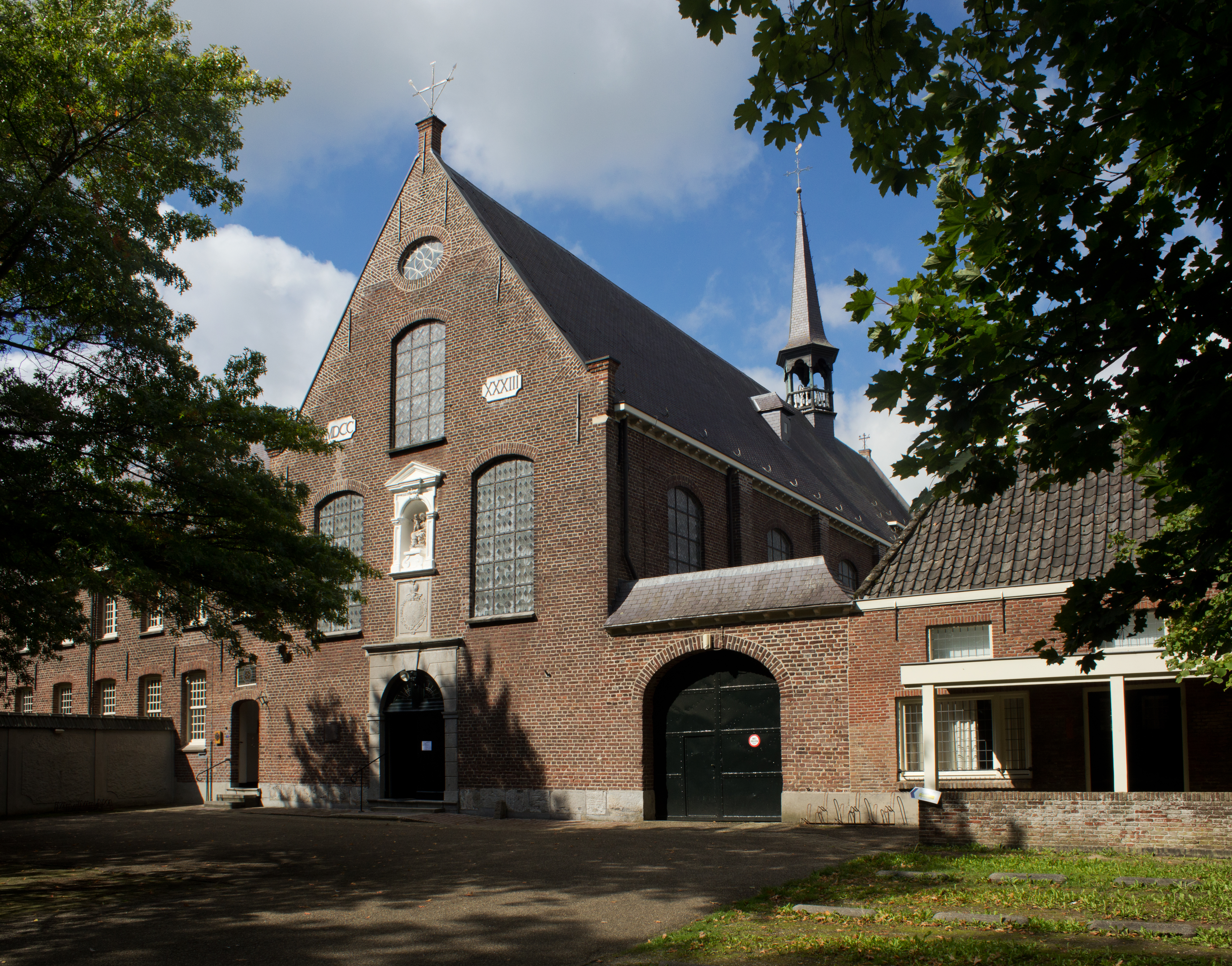
- Capuchin monastery Emmaüs

- Location in the province of North Brabant in the Netherlands Velp (Netherlands)
- Coordinates: 51°44′52″N 5°43′2″E
- Country: Netherlands
- Province: North Brabant
- Municipality: Land van Cuijk

Area
  - Total: 8.90 km^{2} (3.44 sq mi)
- Elevation: 9 m (30 ft)

Population (2021)
  - Total: 1,535
  - Density: 172/km^{2} (447/sq mi)
- Time zone: UTC+1 (CET)
  - Summer (DST): UTC+2 (CEST)
- Postal code: 5363
- Dialing code: 0486

Velp is a village in the Dutch province of North Brabant. It is located in the former municipality of Grave, about 2 km southwest of the city. Until 1794, it was part of the Land van Ravenstein, a Catholic enclave of Palatinate-Neuburg within the Dutch Republic.

== History ==
Velp is a village with two centres. The oldest centre developed on the river bank of the Maas in the Early Middle Ages. A second centre appeared around the seminary Mariëndaal. Velp was part of the Land van Ravenstein which became a Catholic enclave of Palatinate-Neuburg within the Dutch Republic in 1631. The land van Ravenstein was conquered by France in 1794, and sold to the Batavian Republic (the predecessor of the Kingdom of the Netherlands) in 1800.

The St Vincentius Church dates from the 12th century. The tower was built in the 14th century. In 1674, it was restored after a fire. In 1960, it was restored and the modifications from 1765 were undone.

The Capuchin monastery Emmaüs was founded in 1645 by the priest of Grave who had moved to the Land van Ravenstein. It was damaged by floods in the winter of 1715/1716. The monastery was replaced in 1718, and the chapel in 1733.

The former seminary Mariëndaal was built between 1862 and 1865 in neoclassic style with elements of early Gothic Revival. It is currently used a psychiatric hospital.

The Generaal de Bons barracks were built by the city of Grave to defend against the French in 1794. There was no room to build it in Grave, and therefore, it was built over the border in Velp. In 1939, it was renovated and captured by the German army the next year. The Germans used it as barracks until September 1944, and it was later used by the Dutch army. In 1994, it was decided to close the barracks and the last soldiers left in 1997. Until 2019, it was used for asylum seekers.

Velp was home to 614 people in 1840. Velp was a separate municipality until 1942, when it became part of Grave. Since 2022 it has been part of the new municipality of Land van Cuijk.

== Gallery ==
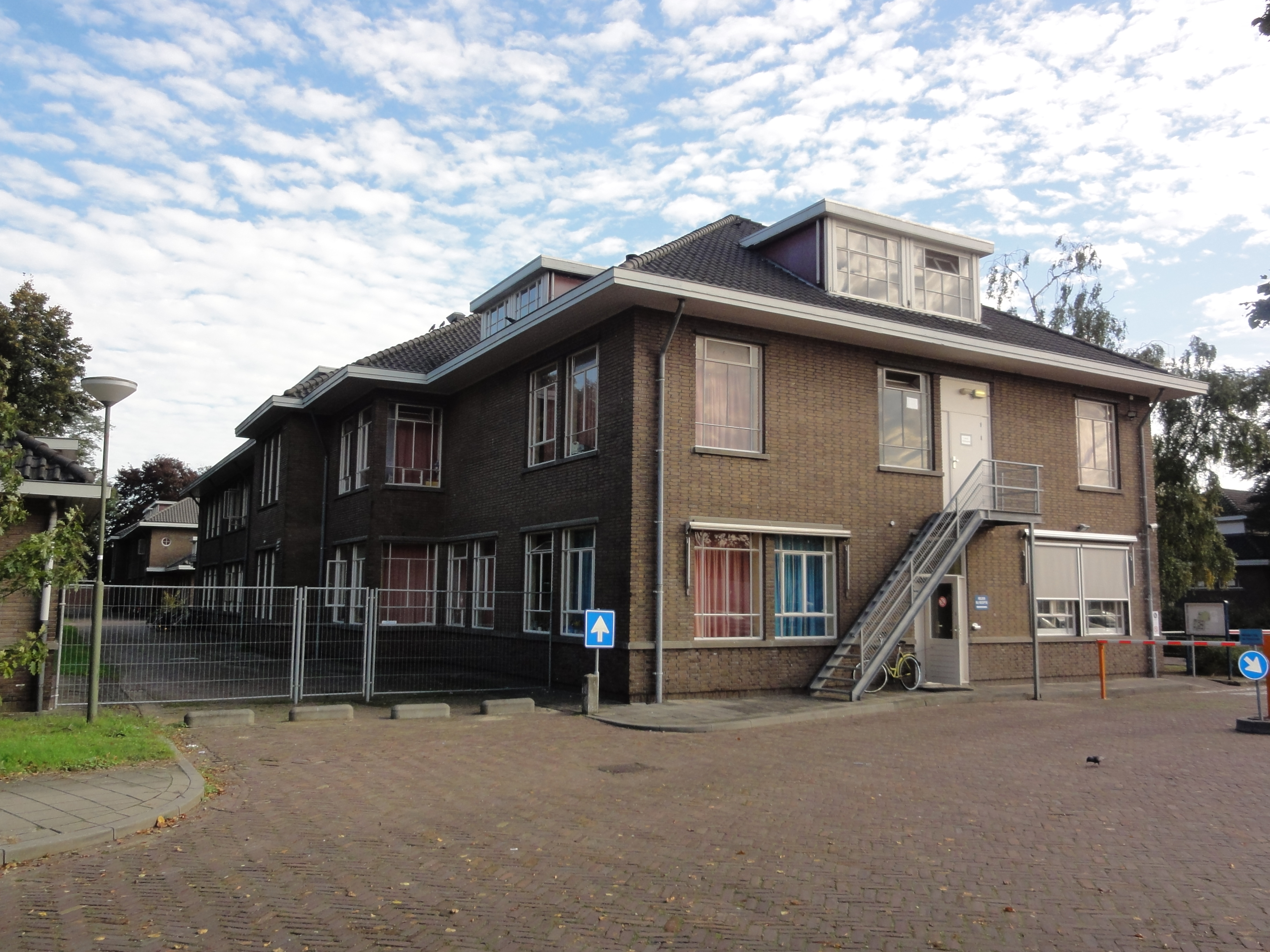
Generaal de Bons barracks

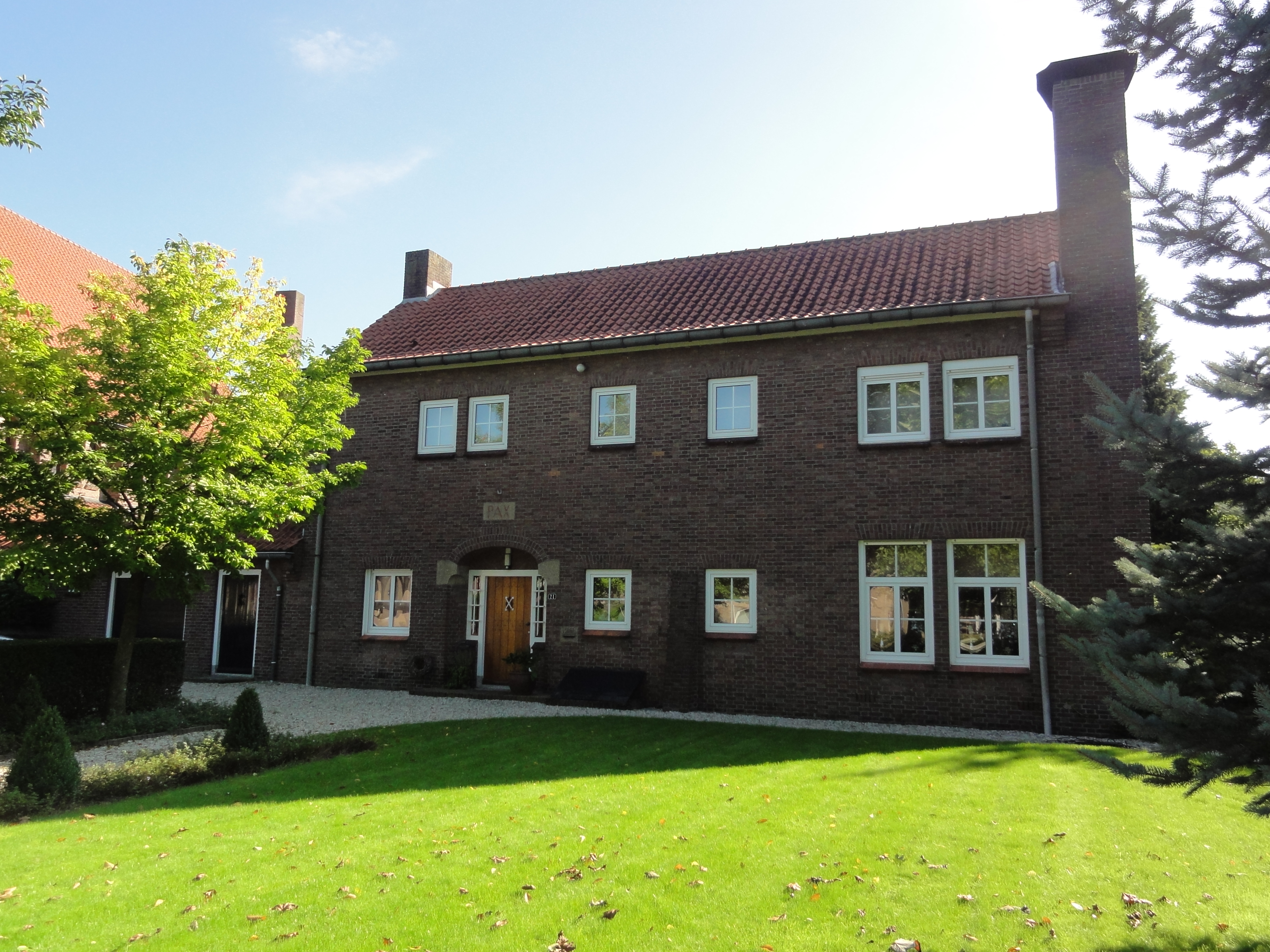
House in Velp

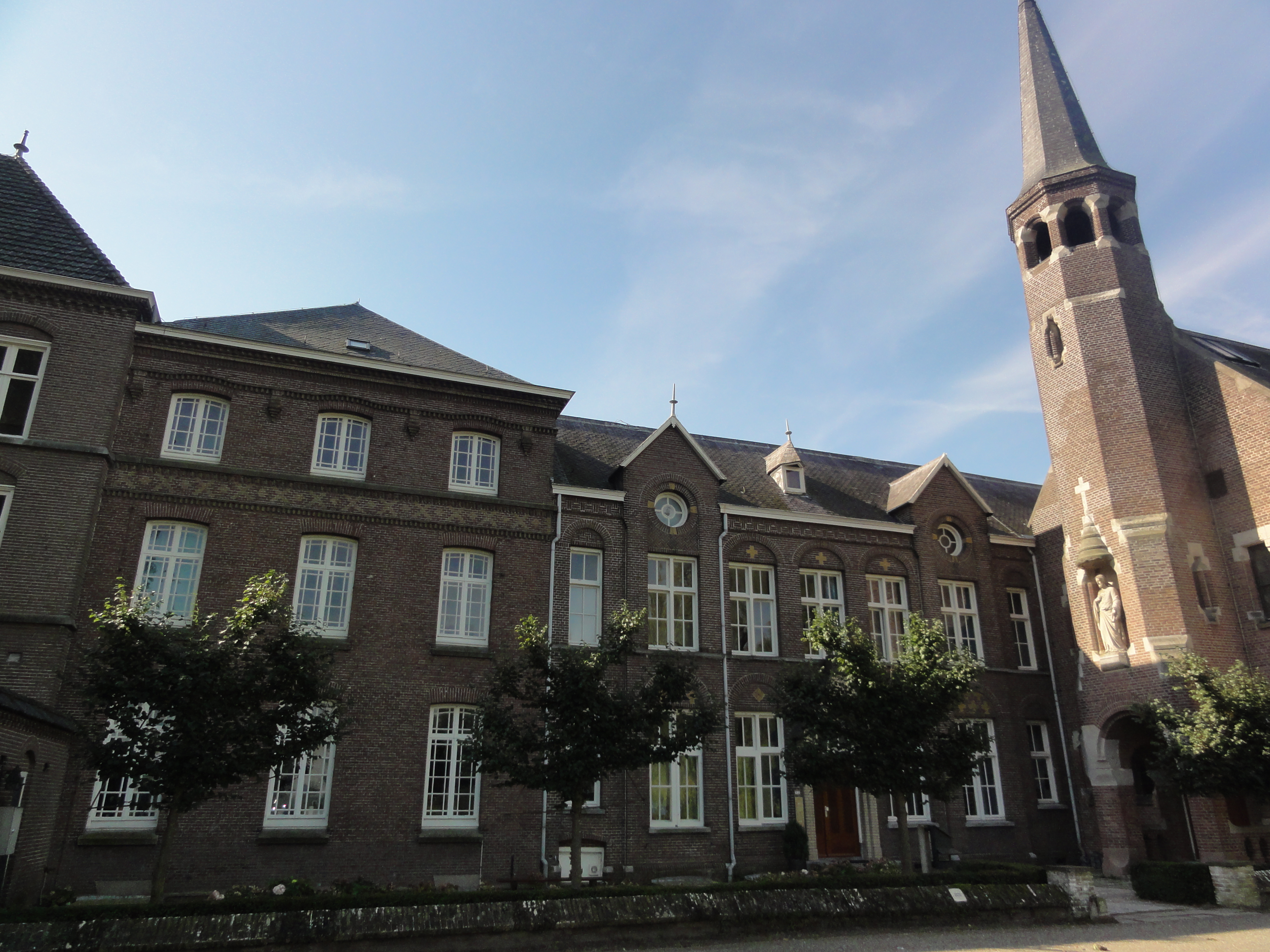
Convent

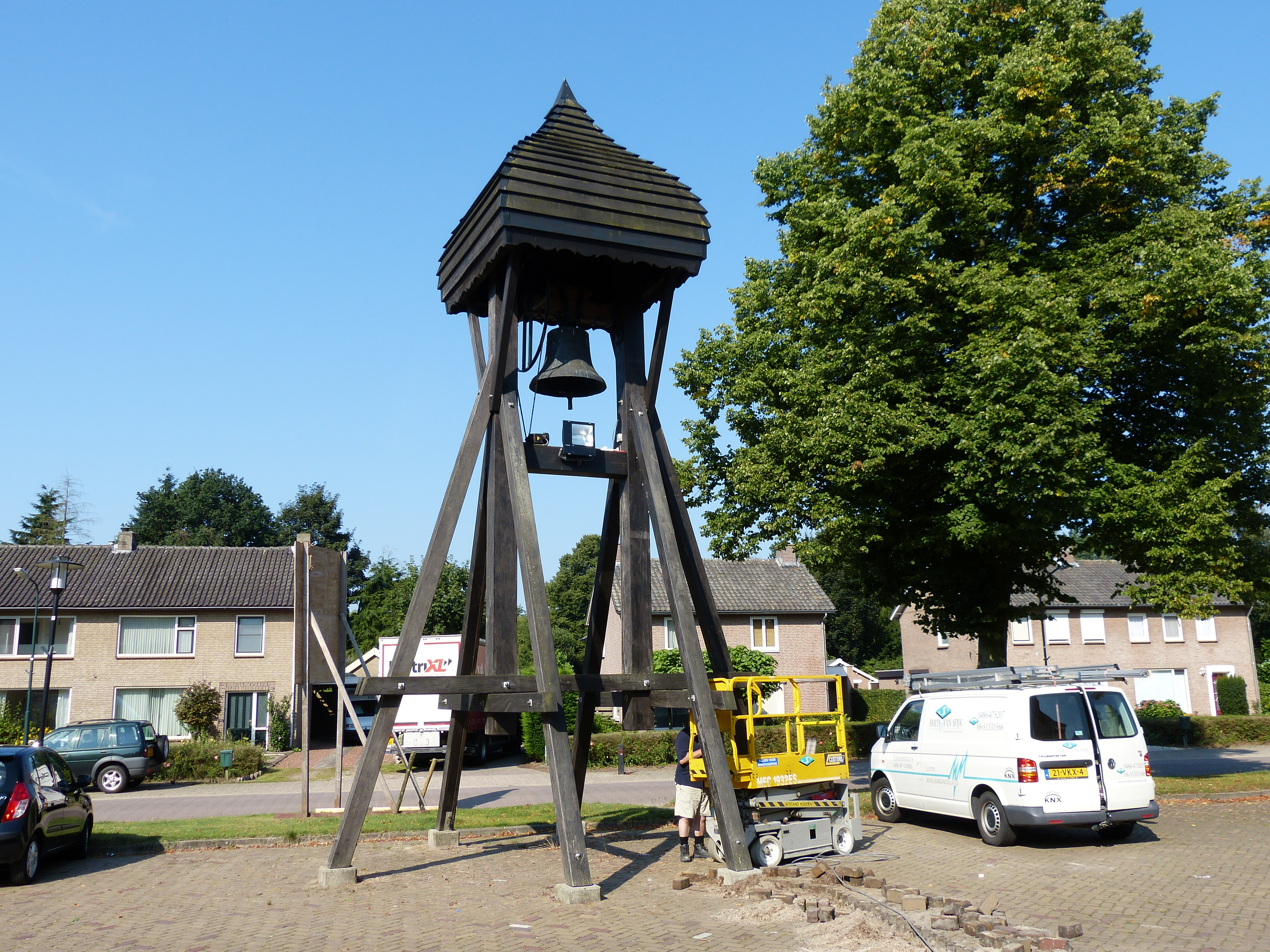
Belfry
