= Johann Weyer =

Dutch physician, occultist and demonologist

Johann Wier
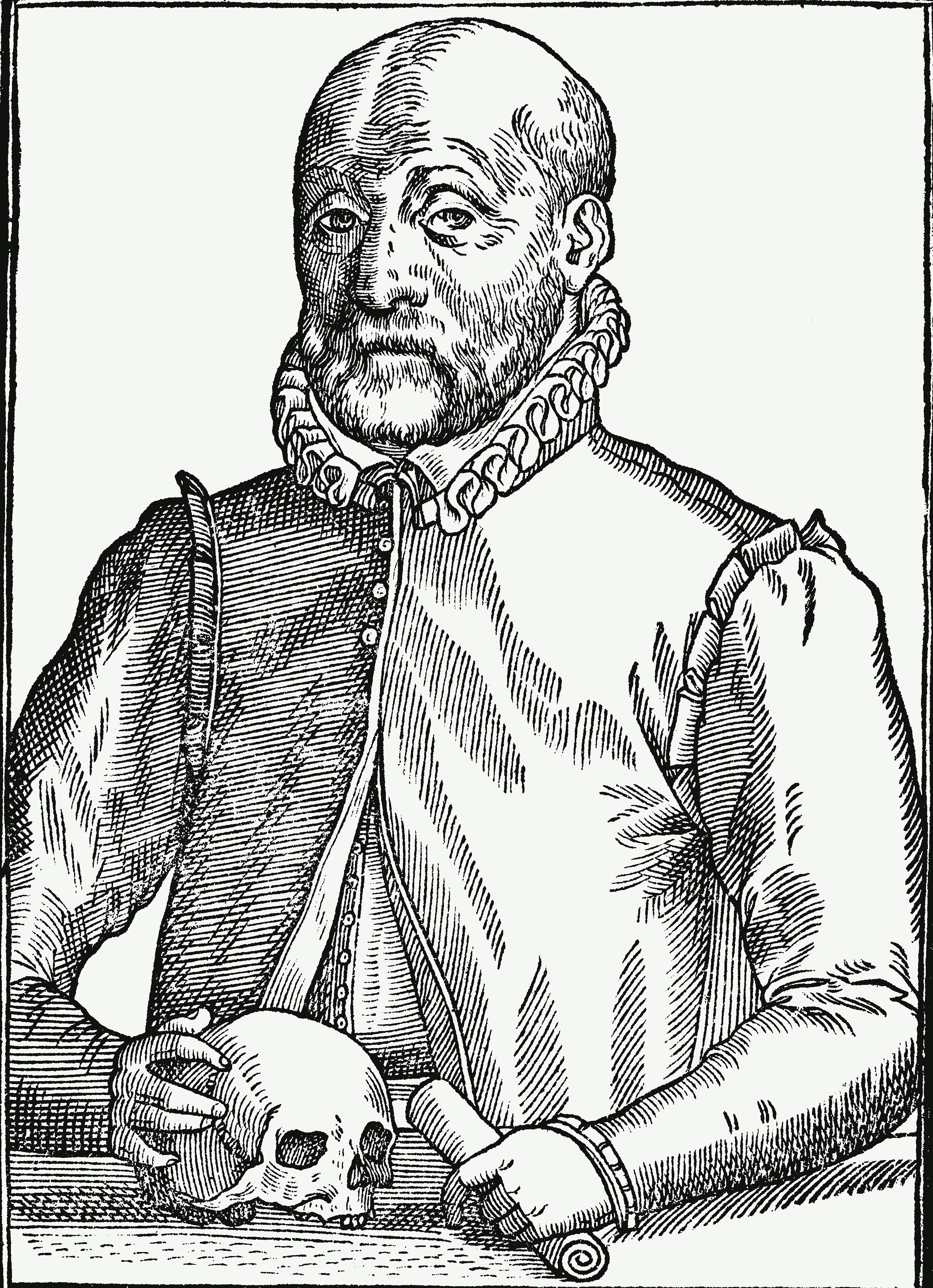
- Engraving of Johann Wier, age 60, from De Lamiis Liber
- Born: 1515; Grave, Duchy of Brabant, Habsburg Netherlands
- Died: 24 February 1588 (aged 73); Tecklenburg, County of Bentheim-Tecklenburg
- Other names: Jan Wier, Johan Wier, Johannes Wier, Jean Wier, Ioannes Wierus, Piscinarius
- Occupations: Physician, general occultist
- Employer: Duke of Jülich-Cleves

Johannes Wier (Latin: Ioannes Wierus or Piscinarius; 1515 – 24 February 1588) was a Dutch physician who was among the first to publish a thorough treatise against the trials and persecution of people accused of witchcraft. His most influential work is De Praestigiis Daemonum et Incantationibus ac Venificiis ('On the Illusions of the Demons and on Spells and Poisons'; 1563).

== Biography ==
Weyer was born in Grave, a small town in the Duchy of Brabant in the Habsburg Netherlands. He attended the Latin schools in 's-Hertogenbosch and Leuven and when he was about 14 years of age, he became a live-in student of Heinrich Cornelius Agrippa, in Antwerp. Agrippa had to leave Antwerp in 1532 and he and Weyer settled in Bonn, under the protection of prince-bishop Hermann von Wied (Agrippa completed a work on demons in 1533 and perished two years later while on a trip to France). From 1534, Weyer studied medicine in Paris and later in Orléans, but it appears unlikely that he obtained the title of Doctor through these studies.

Eventually, he practiced as a physician in his native Grave. Weyer was appointed city physician of Arnhem in 1545. In this capacity, he was asked for advice on witchcraft in a 1548 court case involving a fortune teller. In spite of a subsidy from emperor Charles V, the town of Arnhem was no longer able to pay Weyer's salary. Weyer moved to Cleves in 1550, where he became court doctor to duke William the Rich, through mediation by humanist Konrad Heresbach. Weyer published his major works on witchcraft in which he applied a skeptical medical view to reported wonders and supposed examples of witchcraft. He retired from his post in 1578 and was succeeded by his son, Galenus Wier (1547-1619). After retirement he completed a medical work on a subject unrelated to witchcraft. He died on 24 February 1588 at the age of 73 in Tecklenburg, while visiting an individual who had fallen ill. He was buried in the local churchyard, which no longer exists.

== Work and critical reception ==
Weyer's works include medical and moral works as well as his more famous critiques of magic and witchcraft:

- De Praestigiis Daemonum et Incantationibus ac Venificiis ('On the Illusions of the Demons and on Spells and Poisons'), 1563.
  - Pseudomonarchia Daemonum ('The False Kingdom of the Demons'), an appendix to De Praestigiis Daemonum, 1577.
- Medicarum Observationum rararum liber, 1567, translated into German as:
  - Artzney-Buch von etlichen biß anher unbekandten unnd unbeschriebenen Kranckheiten, 1580, ('A book of medical observations on rare, hitherto undescribed diseases')
- De lamiis liber item de commentitiis jejuniis 1577, (A book on witches together with a treatise on false fasting), translated into German as:
  - De Lamiis, Das ist: Von Teuffelsgespenst Zauberern und Gifftbereytern, kurtzer doch gründtlicher Bericht... 1586
- De ira morbo 1577, ('On the disease of anger'), translated into German as:
  - Vom Zorn, iracundiae antidotum ... : Buch. Von der gefehrlichen Kranckheit dem Zorn, und desselbigen philosophischer, und theologischer Cur oder Ertzney 1585
- De scorbuto epitome, 1564 ('On scurvy')
- Histoire Disputes et Discours des Illusions et Diables, des Magiciens Infame, Sorcieres et Empoisonneurs: des Ensorcelez et Demoniaques et de la Guerison D'Iceux: Item de la Punition que Meritent les Magiciens les Empoisonneurs et les Sorcieres, 1579. 1885 translation printed aux Bureaux du Progres Medical, Paris France. Two volume set.

About 40 people at Casale in Western Lombardy smeared the bolts of the town gates with an ointment to spread the plague. Those who touched the gates where infected and many died. The heirs of the dead and diseased had actually paid people at Casale to smear the gates in order to obtain their inheritances more quickly.

— The Deceptions of Demons, 1583

Weyer criticised the Malleus Maleficarum and the witch hunting by the Christian and Civil authorities; he is said to have been the first person that used the term mentally ill or melancholy to designate those women accused of practicing witchcraft. In a time when witch trials and executions were just beginning to be common, he sought to derogate the law concerning witchcraft prosecution. He claimed that not only were examples of magic largely incredible but that the crime of witchcraft was literally impossible, so that anyone who confessed to the crime was likely to be suffering some mental disturbance (mainly melancholy, a very flexible category with many different symptoms).

Some scholars have said that Weyer intended to mock the concept of the hellish hierarchy that previous grimoires had established by writing those two books and entitling his catalogue of demons Pseudomonarchia Daemonum ('The False Kingdom of the Demons').

Nevertheless, while he defended the idea that the Devil's power was not as strong as claimed by the orthodox Christian churches in De Praestigiis Daemonum, he defended also the idea that demons did have power and could appear before people who called upon them, creating illusions; but he commonly referred to magicians and not to witches when speaking about people who could create illusions, saying they were heretics who were using the Devil's power to do it, and when speaking on witches, he used the term mentally ill.

Moreover, Weyer did not only write the catalogue of demons Pseudomonarchia Daemonum, but also gave their description and the conjurations to invoke them in the appropriate hour and in the name of God and the Trinity, not to create illusions but to oblige them to do the conjurer's will, as well as advice on how to avoid certain perils and tricks if the demon was reluctant to do what he was commanded or a liar. In addition, he wanted to abolish the prosecution of witches, and when speaking on those who invoke demons (which he called spirits) he carefully used the word exorcist.

Weyer never denied the existence of the Devil and a huge number of other demons of high and low order. His work was an inspiration for other occultists and demonologists, including an anonymous author who wrote the Lemegeton (The Lesser Key of Solomon). There were many editions of his books (written in Latin), especially Pseudomonarchia Daemonum, and several adaptations in English, including Reginald Scot's "Discoverie of Witchcraft" (1584).

Weyer's appeal for clemency for those accused of the crime of witchcraft was opposed later in the sixteenth century by the Swiss physician Thomas Erastus, the French legal theorist Jean Bodin and King James VI of Scotland.

== Tributes ==
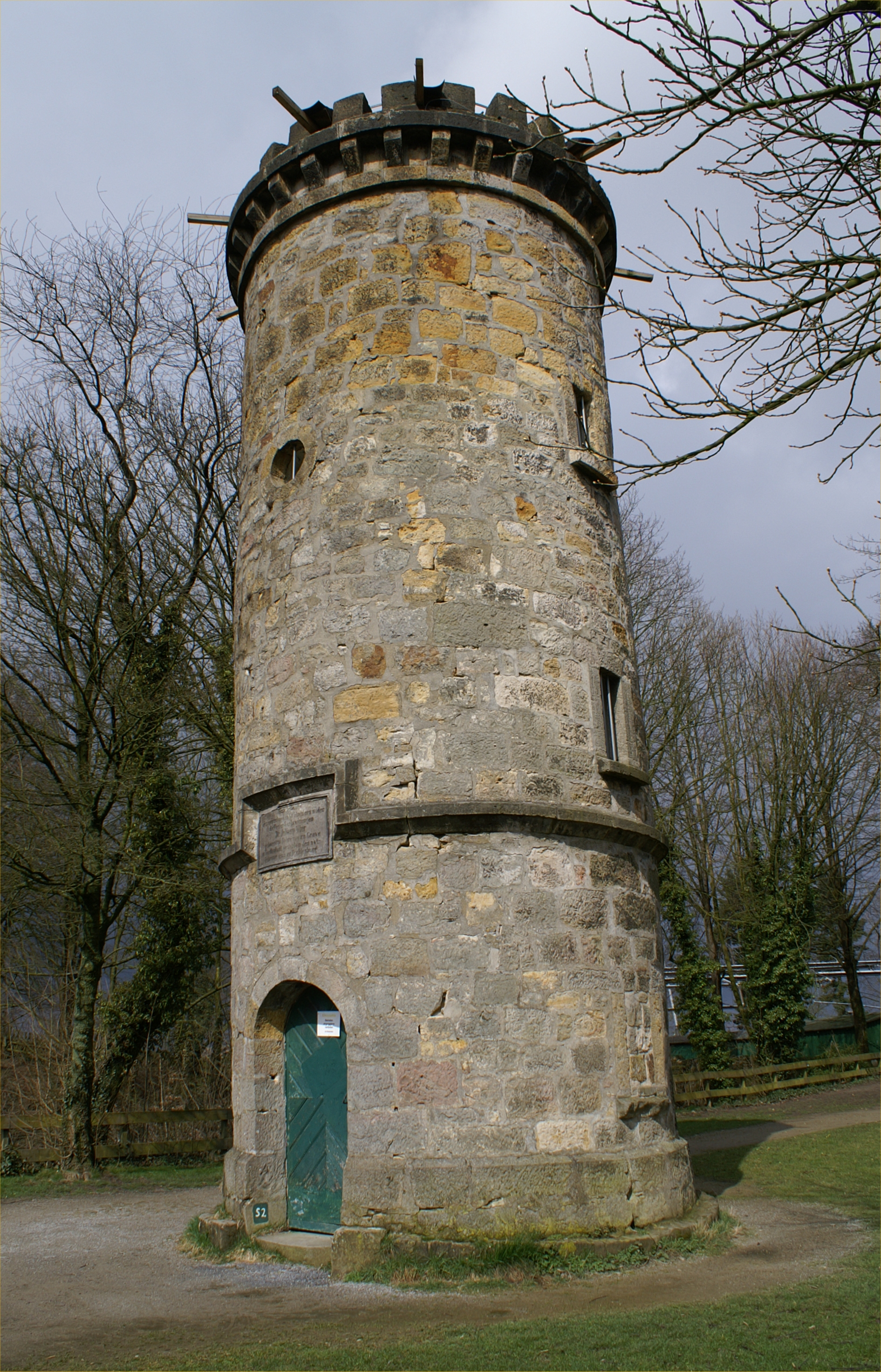
"Weyer's Tower" in Tecklenburg

The church of Tecklenburg displays a plaque in memory of Weyer and, in 1884, the town erected a tower in his honor: the Wierturm (Weyer's tower). The Johannes Wier Foundation, a Dutch health-workers' human rights organization, is also named after him. Alongside his tutor, Heinrich Cornelius Agrippa, he appears as a nonplayer character (NPC) in the video game Amnesia: The Dark Descent.

Kurt Baschwitz, a pioneer in communication studies and mass psychology, dedicated to the merits of Weyer most of the content of his own first Dutch monography on witchcraft and witch trials, De strijd tegen den duivel - de heksenprocessen in het licht der massapsychologie (The Battle Against the Devil: Witch Trials in the Light of Mass Psychology), written in 1948. Later, in 1963, he extended this work to his German magnum opus, Hexen und Hexenprozesse: Geschichte eines Massenwahns und seiner Bekaempfung (Witches and witch trials: History of a mass hysteria and its suppression), which discussed methods of fighting attempts at mass delusion.

== Family ==
Johan was the son of Agnes Rhordam and Theodorus (Dirk) Wier, a merchant of hops, coal and slate, who was a schepen of Grave in the 1520s. Dirk and Agnes Wier came from Zeeland and were closely acquainted with Maximiliaan van Egmond and Françoise de Lannoy, the future in-laws of William the Silent. Johan had two known siblings, Arnold Wier and the mystic Mathijs Wier (c.1520–c.1560). In Arnhem, he married Judith Wintgens, with whom he had at least five children. After Judith's death he married Henriette Holst. Johan's oldest son, Diederik Wier, became a jurist and diplomat, who in 1566-7, while employed by Willem IV van den Bergh, was involved in the "petitions of grievances about the suppression of heresy" by the Dutch nobility to Philip II of Spain, the rejection of which led to the Eighty Years' War.

== Name ==
Weyer signed all his correspondence with "Johannes Wier" or occasionally with "Piscinarius". His parents and children carried the name "Wier" as well, and in 1884 his memorial in Germany was still named "Wierturm" rather than "Weyerturm". Nevertheless, since the 20th century the name "Johann Weyer" has become standard in German- and English-language scholarship. The use of "Weyer" may stem from Carl Binz's 1896 monograph Doctor Johann Weyer, ein rheinischer Arzt, der erste Bekämpfer des Hexenwahns ("Doctor Johann Weyer, a Rhenish physician, the first fighter against the witches-craze"), who in 1885 had already given the Wier oder Weyer? lecture (English: "Wier or Weyer?"), in which he, apparently unaware of Weyer's Zeeland origin, claimed that "Weyer belonged to the German nation" ("Weyer zur deutchen Nation zählte") and that Wier was merely a Low Rhenish dialectal pronunciation of Weyer.

== See also ==
- Nicholas Remy
- Daemonolatreiae libri tres

== Editions ==
- De praestigiis Daemonum ... Libri V. Basel: Oporinus, 1563.
- De praestigiis Daemonum ... Libri V. Basel: Oporinus, 1564.
- De praestigiis Daemonum ... Libri V. Basel: Oporinus, 1566.
- Medicarum observationum rararum Liber I. Basel: Oporinus, 1567
- De lamiis liber. Basel: Oporinus, 1577.
- De praestigiis Daemonum ... Libri 6. Basel: Ex Officina Oporiniana, 1577.
- De Praestigiis Daemonum, & incantationibus ac veneficiis Libri sex, postrema editione sexta aucti & recogniti. Basel: Oporinus, 1583.
- Opera Omnia. Amsterdam: Peter Vanden Berge, 1660.
