= Mortroux, Belgium =

Village of Wallonia, Belgium

Coordinates: 50.7133°N 5.7525°E

Mortroux (Walloon: Mwetrou) is a village of Wallonia and a district of the municipality of Dalhem, located in the province of Liège, Belgium.

Prior to 1977 Mortroux was a municipality of its own.
