= Ulrich Molitor =

German lawyer (c. 1442–c. 1507)

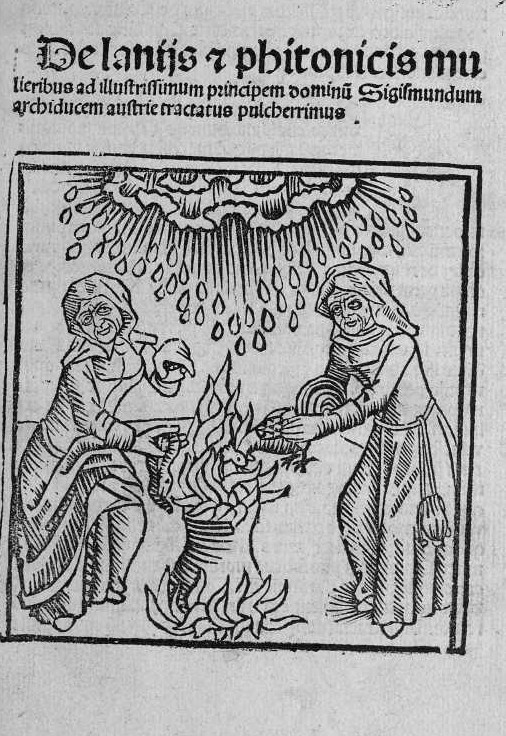

Ulrich Molitor (also Molitoris) (c. 1442 – before 23 December 1507) was a lawyer who wrote a treatise offering qualified support, joined to clarifications and methodological critiques derived Canon Law, to the recent witch-phobic efforts by Heinrich Kramer represented in Krämer's then-recently-published manual for the interrogation and prosecution of witchcraft Malleus Maleficarum.

Molitor maintains the tradition held in the Canon Episcopi that attendance of black masses in which Satan is adored and sexually worshipped are hallucinated episodes or dreams, but does not otherwise oppose or refute the existence of witchcraft. He counsels against the admission of confessions extracted by torture in court since this sort of testimony is often false. Molitor's work, De Lamiis et Pythonicis Mulieribus, was first published in 1489, three years after the first edition of Kramer's work, Malleus Maleficarum, and both books were reprinted frequently throughout the 1490s. Moliter was likely to have personally witnessed the inquisitions led by Heinrick Kramer in the diocese of Brixen and the diocese of Constance.

Molitor's work is written in the form of a dialogue with Molitor's position that of a skeptic in opposition to a witch-phobic fanatic (likely meant to represent Kramer). A third figure, Archduke Sigismund, acts as a wise arbiter. Molitor's position is that of the ancient and long-held traditional Catholic law, the Canon Episcopi (906), that considered witchcraft an illusion. Molitor quotes the Bible, Church Fathers and poets and focusses on the devil's ability to deceive. Sigismund in the dialogue is quick to dismiss evidence that was produced through the use of torture: "For the fear of punishments incites men to say what is contrary to the nature of the facts". Sigismund had also experienced an inquisition led by Kramer in Innsbruck in 1485 and may have played a decisive role in shutting it down, thereby preventing seven accused women from being executed.

The density of illustrations, along with the conceit of a dramatic dialogue included in the work indicate that it was intended for popular consumption and not solely as a work of legal or juridical criticism.

== Editions ==
- Molitoris, Ulrich, Schriften, ed. Jörg Mauz SJ [Studien zur Kulturgeschichte 1) (Constance, 1997)
- Molitor, Ulrich, Von Unholden und Hexen, New edition, annotated and translated into modern German, UBooks 2008

=== Sources ===
- Ammann, Hartmann, Der Innsbrucker Hexenprozess von 1485, in: Ferdinandeum Zeitschrift III. Folge, 34. Heft, S. 31 ff.
- Beyer, Jürgen, 'Molitor, Ulrich', in Enzyklopädie des Märchens. Handwörterbuch zur historischen und vergleichenden Erzählforschun, vol. 9 (Berlin & New York, 1997–99), col. 767-769
- Mauz, Jörg, Ulrich Molitoris. Ein süddeutscher Humanist und Rechtsgelehrter (Vienna, 1992)
- Geiling, Jens and Gawron, Thomas: "Molitor, Ulrich" in: Lexikon zur Geschichte der Hexenverfolgung historicum.net)
