= Daemonolatreiae libri tres =

1595 work by Nicolas Remi

Daemonolatreiae libri tres is a 1595 work by Nicholas Rémy. It was edited by Montague Summers and translated as Demonolatry in 1929.

Along with the Malleus Maleficarum, it is generally considered one of the most important early works on demons and witches. The book was drawn from the capital trials of roughly 900 persons who were tried and put to death in a fifteen-year span in the Duchy of Lorraine for the crime of witchcraft."

The Daemonolatreiae contains citations from a great many authors, ancient and modern, including Johann Weyer, who is cited as an authority as if there were no differences between his position and that of Rémy. The book is also based on cases from the archives, but Rémy seems never to have returned the cases that he used, so it is impossible to check his account of any particular case against the original records.
