= Nicholas Rémy =

French anti-witchcraft magistrate

Nicholas Rémy, Latin Remigius (1530–1616) was a French magistrate who claimed in his book to have overseen the execution of more than 800 witches and the torture or persecution of a similar number. His work shows much influence from Jean Bodin.

== Early life ==
After studying law at the University of Toulouse, Remy practised in Paris from 1563 to 1570. In 1570, his uncle retired as Lieutenant General of Vosges and Remy was appointed to the post; in 1575 he was appointed secretary to Duke Charles III of Lorraine.

== Publications ==
Remy wrote a number of poems and several books on history, but is known for his Daemonolatreiae libri tres ("Demonolatry"), written in Latin and published in Lyon in 1595. The book was reprinted several times, translated into German, and eventually replaced the Malleus Maleficarum as the most recognized handbook of witch-hunters in parts of Europe.

According to Remy, the Devil could appear before people in the shape of a black cat or man, and liked Black Masses. Demons could also have sexual relationships with women and, in case they did not agree, rape them.

== Career ==
He was of the Catholic faith, and wrote his Latin works with the blessings of the Church, but was not himself a priest and married at least once (possibly twice), fathering quite a few children. One of them, a favored son, was supposedly killed in a street accident at the beginning of Remy's judicial career after being cursed by an old beggar woman when Remy refused to give her any money. This incident in 1582 was the start of Remy's career as a witch-hunter. He successfully prosecuted the beggar for bewitching his son and had the woman put to death.

Finding witches was very personal business for Remy. An extremely educated man for his day, he seemed to have utterly believed in what he was doing. Remy personally sentenced 900 people to death between 1581 and 1591. In 1592, Remy retired and moved to the country to escape the bubonic plague. There he compiled notes from his ten-year campaign against witchcraft into the Demonolatry.

== Claims 800 executed and a revision ==
Remy bragged that during a mere 16-year period when he worked as a judge in Lorraine, not less than 800 persons (non minus octingentos) were condemned at the stake for sortilegis crimen or the crime of witchcraft (sorcery seems to derive from the Latin sortilegus), which certain witch-phobic Christians of this time period considered to a real supernatural power that was sourced from the devil. Remy further claims than an equivalent number of around 800 persons escaped punishment by fleeing capture or by "a stubborn endurance of the torture."

Writing more than 400 years later, the scholar William Monter scoffs at these numbers and claims that Lorraine's records from the 1580s are "well-preserved" and amount to barely "one-sixth as many as Nicholas Remy boasted in his Demonalatria of 1595." Monter characterizes Remy's claim of 800 condemned as "a literary flourish" and refers to Remy as a "humanist" though there does not seem to be any instance in which Remy used the term "humanist" to describe himself. Remy dedicated his book to the Cardinal of Lorraine and characterizes himself a soldier in a war against anti-Christian forces that he considers aligned with the devil. Monter's reason for doubting Remy's numbers is that Remy's book lists the specific names of "only about 125 individuals tried for witchcraft." Monter compares Remy's list to some instances of non-corroboration within the surviving records and concludes that "we must take his numbers with a very large grain of salt; but the documented reality is dreadful enough."

In forwarding his theory, Monter did not proffer a reason or motive for Remy to inflate his numbers or why the printer and booksellers (including a number of reprints) would have wanted a brag of "900 Person's More or Less" on the title page of Remy's work, and whether this may have helped sell books, and if so, what this also might say about the well-educated Latin readers who were the target audience for Remy's work, written and sold in a Catholic borderland region during a time period often referred to as the Counter Reformation.

== Pop culture ==
- In the 1987 television series Werewolf, Nicholas Remy is shown as a werewolf who has been alive since the times of the Inquisition. He used his position as a magistrate to conceal his own lycanthropy. The character was portrayed by Brian Thompson.
- Nicholas Remy and his book, Daemonolatreiae libri tres, are also featured in the 1999 movie The Ninth Gate.
