= Rijkevoort =

- Village
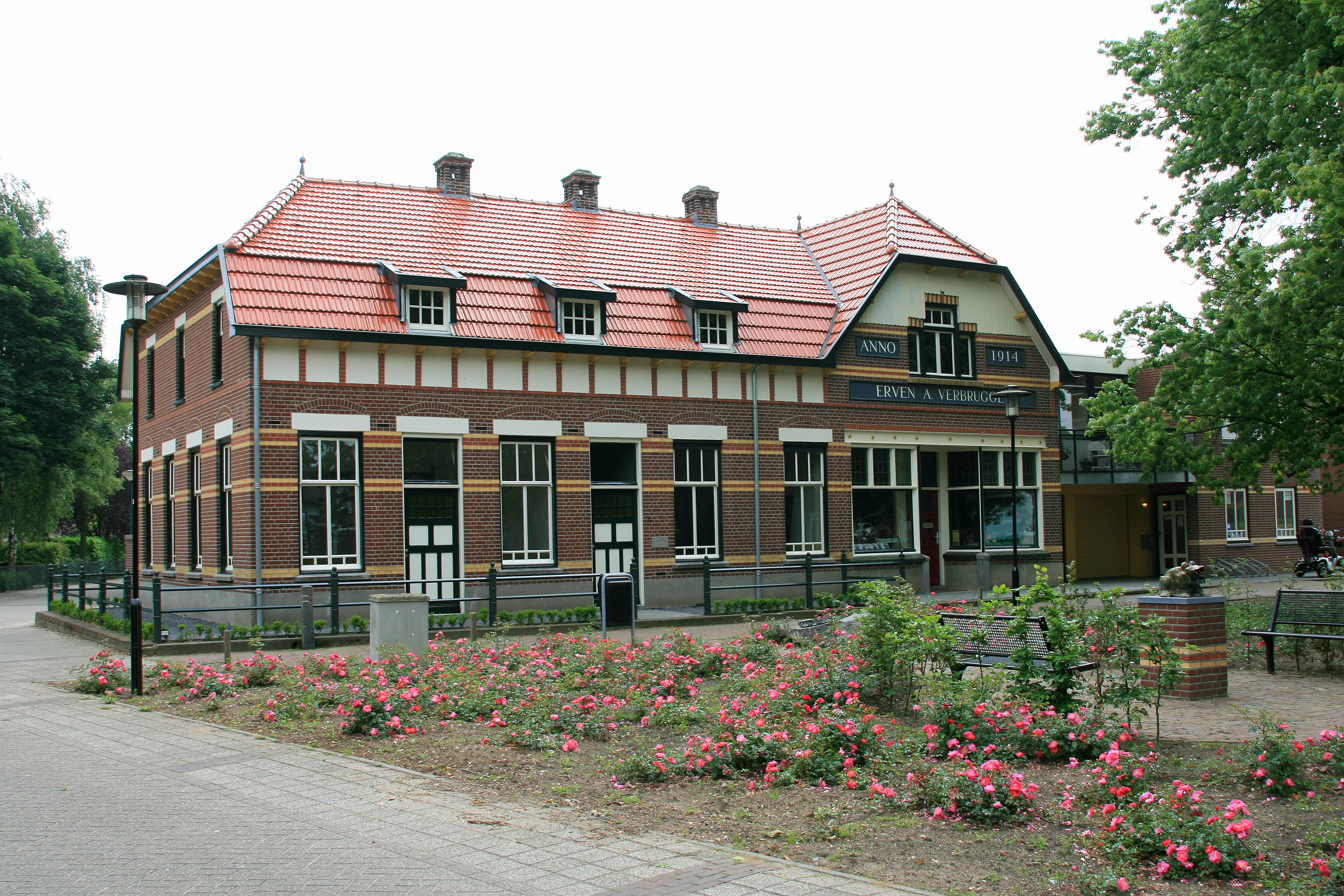
- Former grocery

- Location in the province of North Brabant in the Netherlands Rijkevoort (Netherlands)
- Coordinates: 51°39′28″N 5°53′06″E
- Country: Netherlands
- Province: North Brabant
- Municipality: Laarbeek

Area
  - Total: 12.10 km^{2} (4.67 sq mi)
- Elevation: 13 m (43 ft)

Population (2021)
  - Total: 1,670
  - Density: 138/km^{2} (357/sq mi)
- Time zone: UTC+1 (CET)
  - Summer (DST): UTC+2 (CEST)
- Postal code: 5447
- Dialing code: 0485

Rijkevoort is a church village with more than 1600 inhabitants. Until 1942, Rijkevoort together with Beugen formed the municipality of Beugen en Rijkevoort. This municipality was then split and Rijkevoort joined the municipality of Wanroij. Since the municipal reorganization of 1 January 1994, most of Rijkevoort belonged to the municipality of Boxmeer. The neighbourhood Rijkevoort-De Walsert was then added to the municipality of Sint Anthonis. Since 2022 Boxmeer and Sint Anthonis have been part of the new municipality of Land van Cuijk.

== Toponymy ==
The name Rijkevoort consists of two parts. 'Forward' means 'ford' and 'rich' is probably derived from 'Rijt', meaning 'watercourse'.

== History ==
Originally, Rijkevoort is an agricultural mining settlement founded by Beugen. The surrounding area was initially marshy which is apparent in field names like: Walsertse Broek, Papenvoortse Broek, Laageindebroek, Hoogeindebroek and Rijkevoortse Broek. These are relatively low-lying areas east of the Peel.

The oldest mention of Rijkevoort dates back to 1487

== Sint-Rochuskerk ==
Since the end of the 15th century, in Rijkevoort there was a chapel dedicated to Saint Rochus but not a full parish church, but depending on the parish of Beugen: Marriage and baptism occurred there. True, twice a week, a Carmelite came from Beugen to Rijkevoort to give the Mass, but on high days one had to go to Beugen. In 1648, the chapel was withdrawn from the government by the state authority. Only in 1722 was Rijkevoort elevated to an independent parish and there was a barn church. Around 1800 were Catholics back their chapel again, but from 1819 to 1820 the chapel was substantially enlarged which was only kept the choir. In 1888 a new, neo-Gothic church was built. Archirtect was Johannes Kayser. In 1927, the church was re-enlarged, now by father and son Caspar and Joseph Franssen. As the number of parishes continued to grow, it was proposed in 1956 to demolish this church and replace it with a new one. However, this did not continue so that the church remained.

== Windmill ==
In the middle of the village is the wind mill Luctor et Emergo from 1901

== Monastery ==
In 1924, the Missionaries of Precious Blood came to Rijkevoort. There were about 47 sisters living at the altitude of the monastery. About 2000, the last sisters, who all reached a high age, left for Tienray. Their sober monastery building is still in Rijkevoort.

== Nature and landscape ==
The Sint Anthonisloop, a channeled side branch of the Lage Raam, runs through the centre of the village. The Lage Raam flows south of the village. These watercourses take care of the drainage of the former trout areas, all of which are mined to the agricultural area on a few strips of trees along the watercourses.

== Sport ==
Football club Toxandria, volleyball club Luctor and tennis association TeVeR are associations from Rijkevoort. The football club, as well as several other organizations of (Catholic) associations, which largely disappeared in the course of history, were founded by master Gerard van den Berg, head of the boys school in Rijkevoort. To him, in the center of Rijkevoort, was called the Meester van den Bergplein.

== Nearby towns ==
Haps, Beugen, Boxmeer, Sint Anthonis, Wanroij

== Gallery ==
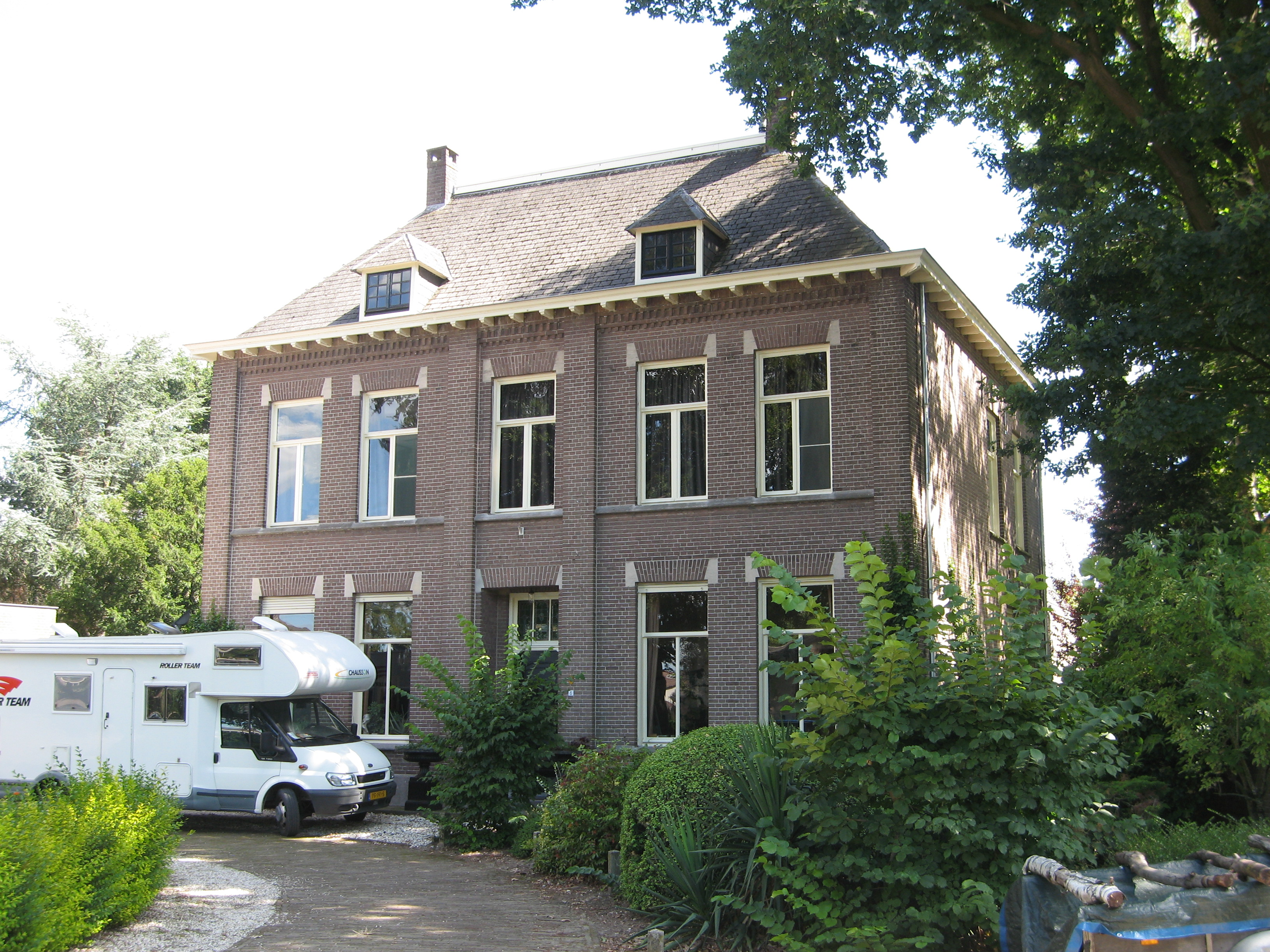
Villa in Rijkevoort

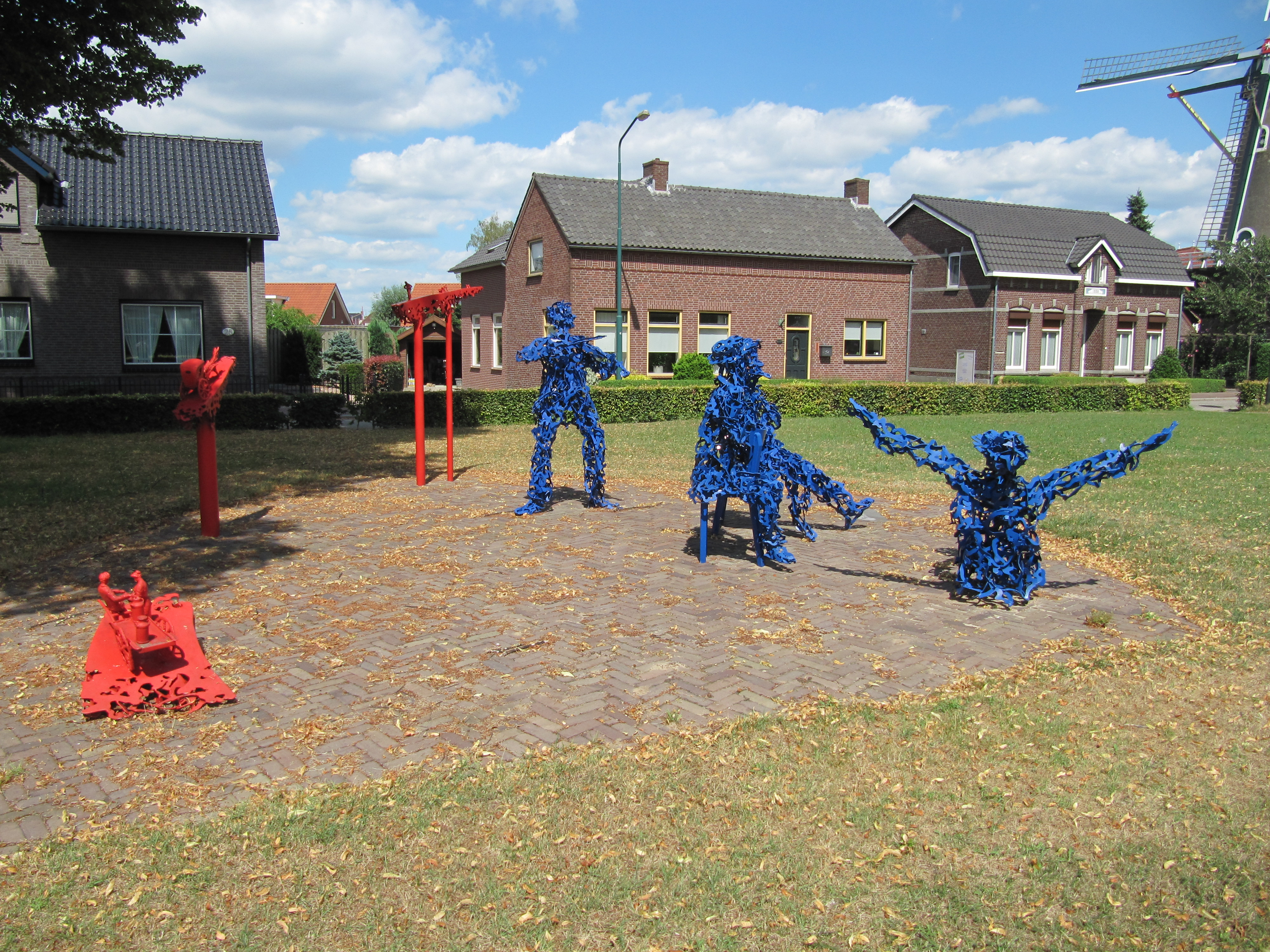
Sculptures in the square

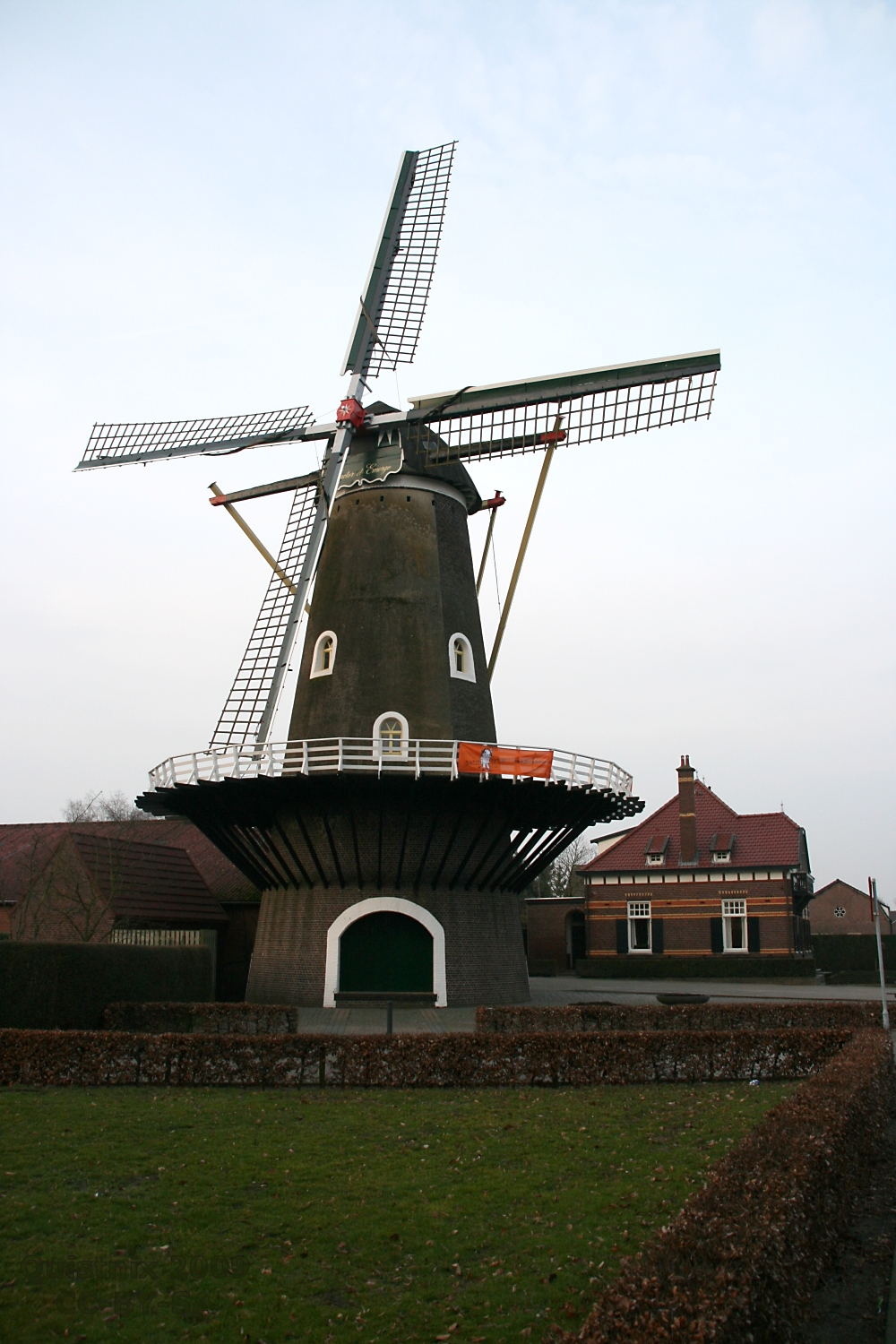
Wind mill Luctor et Emergo
