= Beugen en Rijkevoort =

Coordinates: 51°40′N 5°55′E

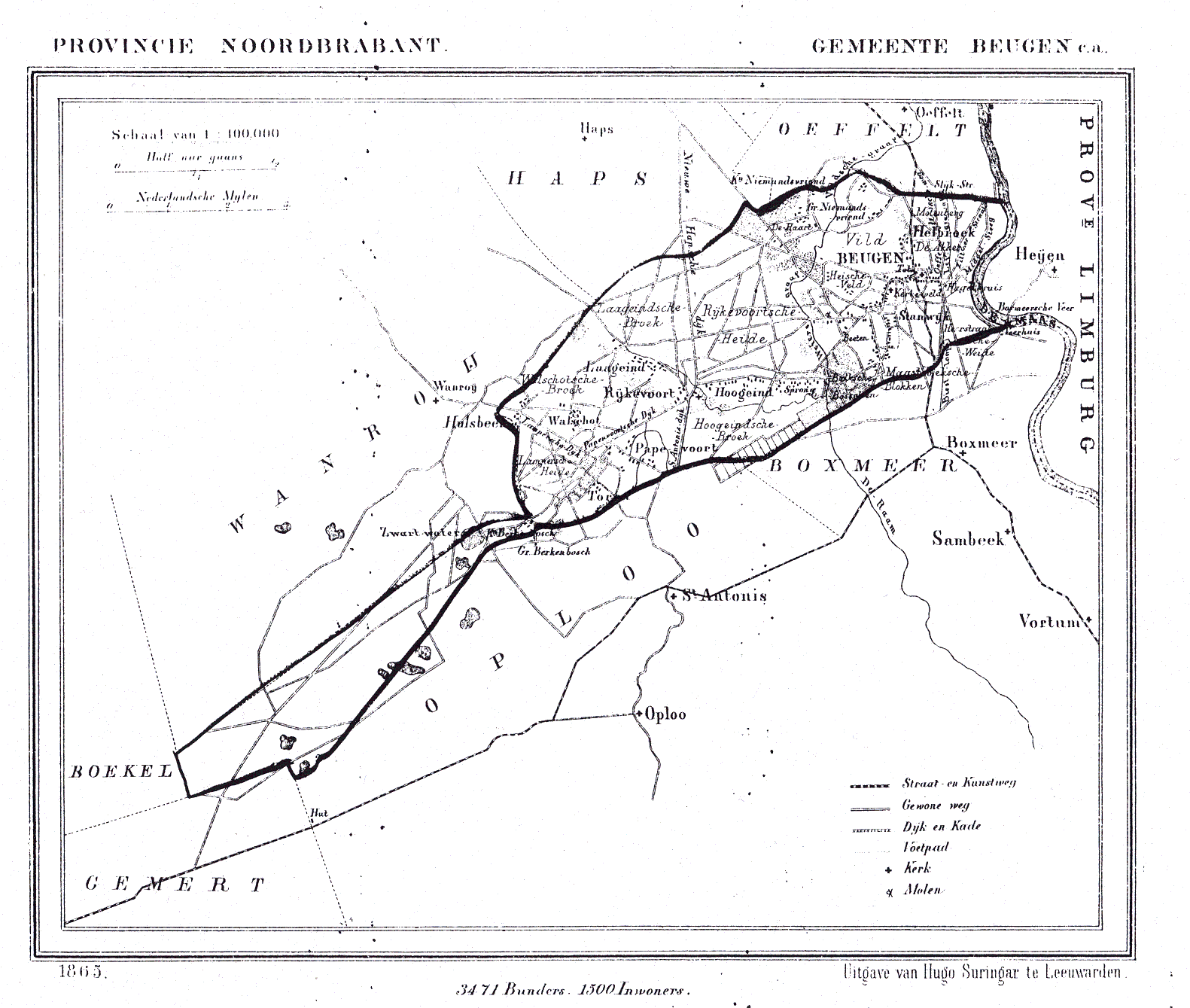
A map of Beugen c.1865

Beugen en Rijkevoort is a former municipality in the Netherlands, in the province of North Brabant. It covered the villages of Beugen and Rijkevoort.

The municipality existed until 1942, when Beugen became part of Boxmeer and Rijkevoort being part of Wanroij.
