= Sint Anthonis en Ledeacker =

Former Dutch municipality

Coordinates: 51.63187°N 5.876827°E

Sint Anthonis en Ledeacker was a municipality in the Dutch province of North Brabant. It consisted of the villages of Sint Anthonis and Ledeacker.

The municipality existed until 1821, when it merged with Oploo to form the new municipality Oploo, Sint Anthonis en Ledeacker, which became part of the new municipality of Sint Anthonis in 1994.

Since 2022, Sint Anthonis has been part of the new municipality of Land van Cuijk.
