= Dien Cornelissen =

Dutch politician and social worker

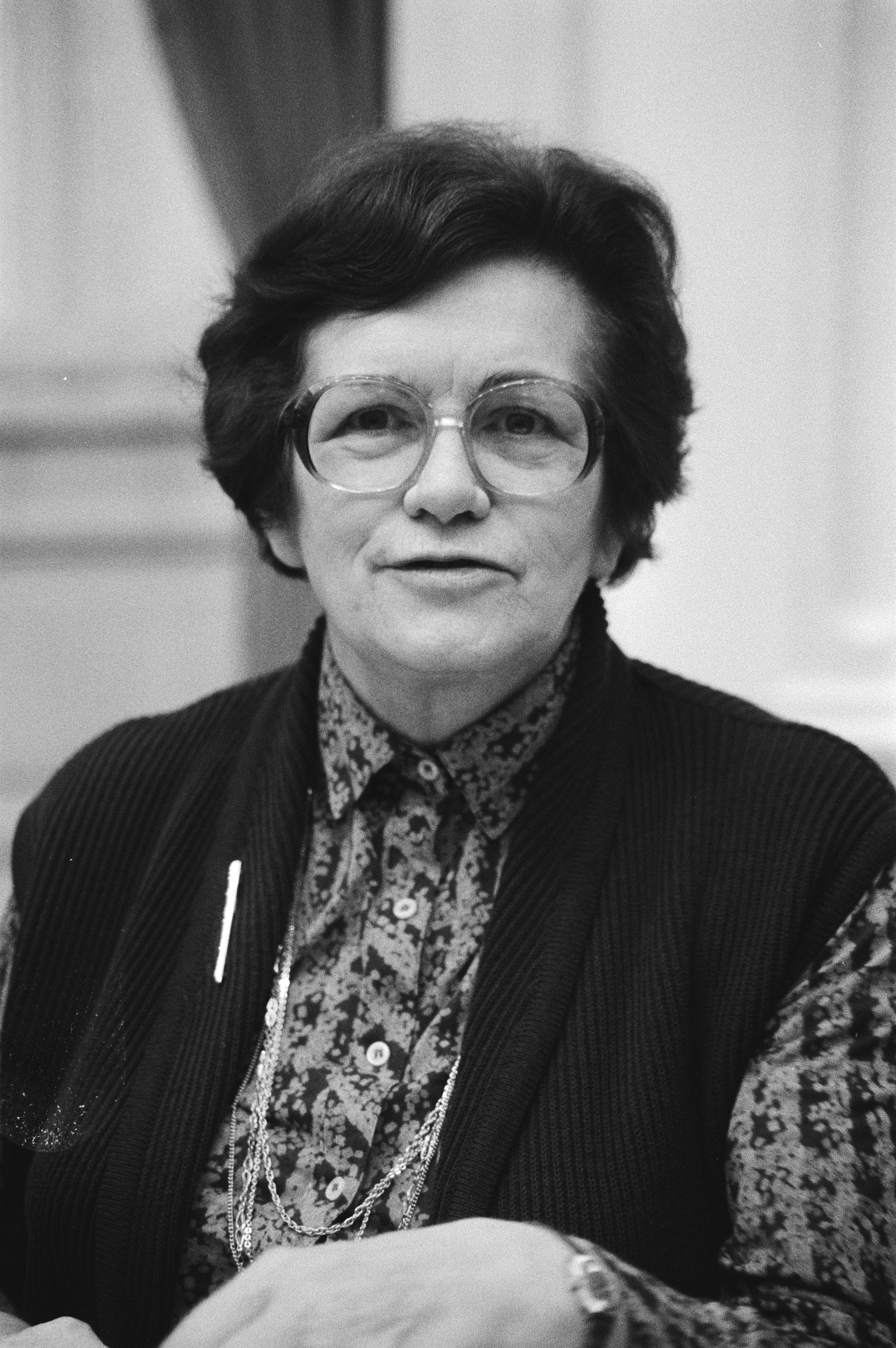

Member of the municipal council of Boxmeer
- In office 2 September 1958 – 1972

Member of the States of North Brabant
- In office 6 June 1962 – 7 June 1978

Member of the Senate
- In office 16 September 1969 – 15 September 1971

Member of the House of Representatives
- In office 21 September 1971 – 7 December 1972; 28 May 1973 – 3 June 1986

Personal details
- Born: 8 May 1924 Oploo, Netherlands
- Died: 25 May 2015 (aged 91) Boxmeer, Netherlands
- Party: Catholic People's Party (until 1980), Christian Democratic Appeal (from 1980)

Gerardina Maria Paulina "Dien" Cornelissen (8 May 1924 – 25 May 2015) was a Dutch politician and social worker. She started her political career in the municipal council of Boxmeer for the Catholic People's Party in 1958, where she would continue until 1972. Between 1962 and 1978 she was member of the States of North Brabant. Between 1969 and 1971 she served a two-year stint in the Dutch Senate. She was member of the House of Representatives from 1971 for fifteen years, with a half year hiatus.

== Career ==
Cornelissen was born on 8 May 1924 in Oploo. Cornelissen had a total of eleven siblings. She went to a boarding school in Schijndel and later the mulo until 1939. From 1946 to 1948 she worked at an organisation which aided war victims. In 1948 she became active for a foundation for social work in the countryside. Apart from her primary education she followed courses in social work and followed an education at the Social Academy in Eindhoven until 1958. As a social worker she worked mainly to improve the position of the mentally handicapped and the parents of children with handicaps.

The political career of Cornelissen began in 1958 when she was elected to municipal council of Boxmeer for the Catholic People's Party. Cornelissen was the first female member of the council and stayed on until 1972. While serving in the council she was elected to the States of North Brabant in 1962 of which she stayed member until 1978.

She was elected member of the Senate by the States-Provincial in 1969. In the Senate she was the party representative on the topic of justice. She was member until she was elected to the House of Representatives of which she became member shortly after the 1971 general election. She served in the House from 21 September 1971 to 7 December 1972 and subsequently from 28 May 1973 to 3 June 1986. In the House she was occupied with public health, social work and justice. In 1980 the Catholic People's Party was dissolved and merged into the Christian Democratic Appeal (CDA) of which Cornelissen became member. In 1981 she was one of sixteen CDA members in the House that voted against the statute of the proposed coalition government of CDA, PvdA and Democrats 66. Between 1981 and 1986 she was also first deputy President of the House.

== Personal life ==
Apart from her political career Cornelissen served in numerous organisations on boards and advice committees mainly relating to social work, education and health. Cornelissen was made Knight in the Order of the Netherlands Lion on 29 April 1982. She was made a Commander in the Order of Orange-Nassau on 18 March 1993. In 1989 she received the honorary medal of the province of North Brabant. In 2008 she was named an honorary citizen of Boxmeer, as of 2015 the only person to have been named such.

Cornelissen never married. She died in Boxmeer on 25 May 2015, aged 91.
