= Beugen =

- Village
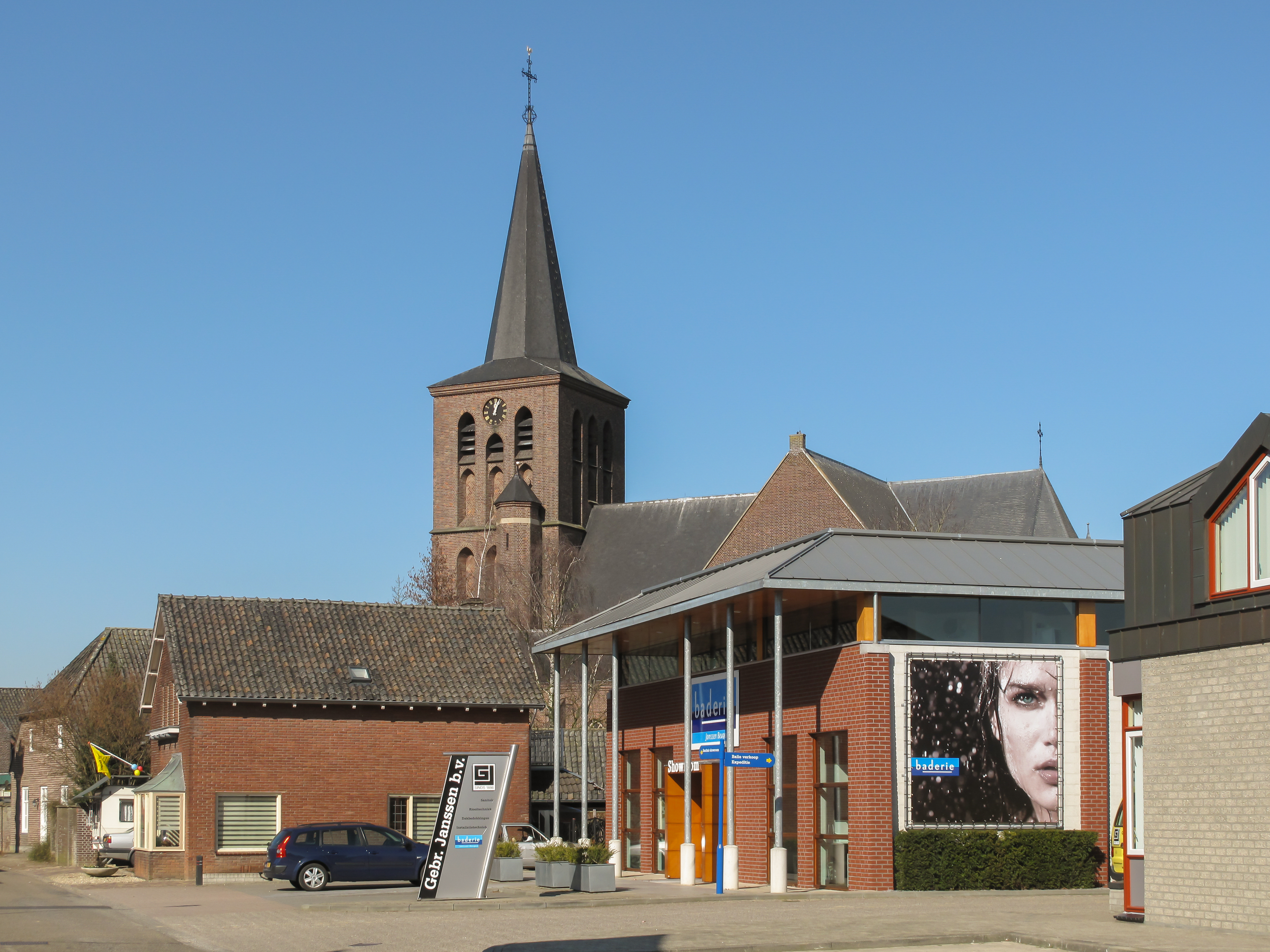
- Street view with church

- Location in the province of North Brabant in the Netherlands Beugen (Netherlands)
- Coordinates: 51.6722°N 5.9372°E
- Country: Netherlands
- Province: North Brabant
- Municipality: Land van Cuijk

Area
  - Total: 10.57 km^{2} (4.08 sq mi)
- Elevation: 14 m (46 ft)

Population (2021)
  - Total: 1,895
  - Density: 179.3/km^{2} (464.3/sq mi)
- Time zone: UTC+1 (CET)
  - Summer (DST): UTC+2 (CEST)
- Postal code: 5835
- Dialing code: 0485

Beugen is a village in the Dutch province of North Brabant. It is part of the municipality of Land van Cuijk. Beugen is located along the Maas and about 20 kilometres (12 mi) south of Nijmegen.

== History ==
The village was first mentioned in 1294 as "de Boghene", and probably means "bend in the river (Maas)".

The Catholic Assumption of Mary Church was built in 1420. The church was enlarged between 1875 and 1879 by Pierre Cuypers. In 1944, the tower was damaged by war and reconstructed in 1950.

The grist mill Martinus was completed in 1868. At the end of World War II, the windmill winding received a direct hit and was destroyed, however the rest of the mill was undamaged. Martinus remained in service until 1955. It was bought by the municipality in 1974. Between 1977 and 1978, the windmill was restored, and is regularly in service on a voluntary basis.

Beugen was home to 1,052 people in 1840. In 1883, a joint railway station with Rijkevoort on the Nijmegen to Venlo railway line opened. It closed in 1938. The village was part of the municipality Beugen en Rijkevoort. In 1942, it was merged into Boxmeer. In 2022, it became part of the municipality of Land van Cuijk. A marina was built along an old anabranch of the Maas. In 2022, construction started on a beach near the marina.

== Notable people ==
- René Meulensteen (born 1964), former footballer and coach
- Bas Mulder (1931–2020), Dutch-Surinamese Catholic priest

== Gallery ==
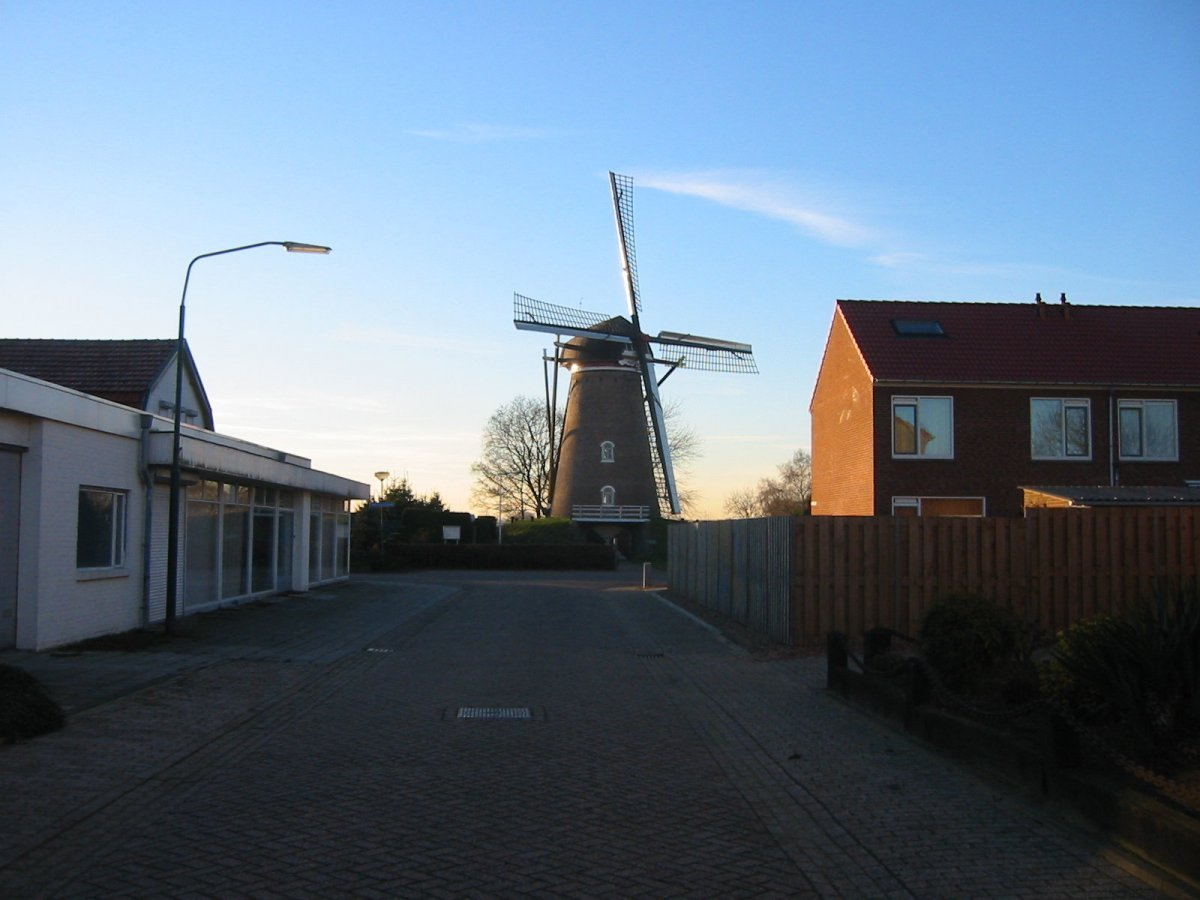
View on wind mill Martinus

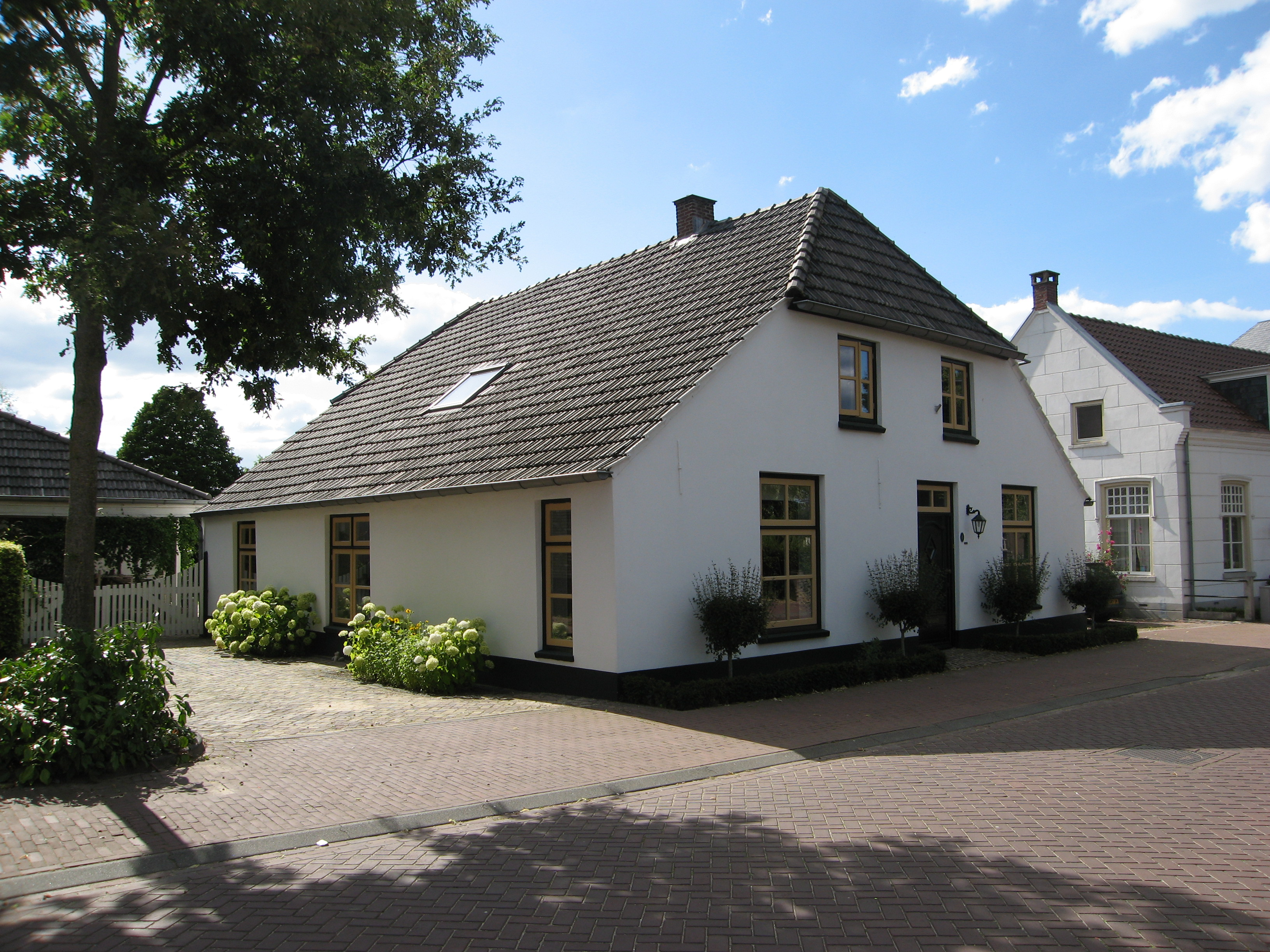
House in Beugen

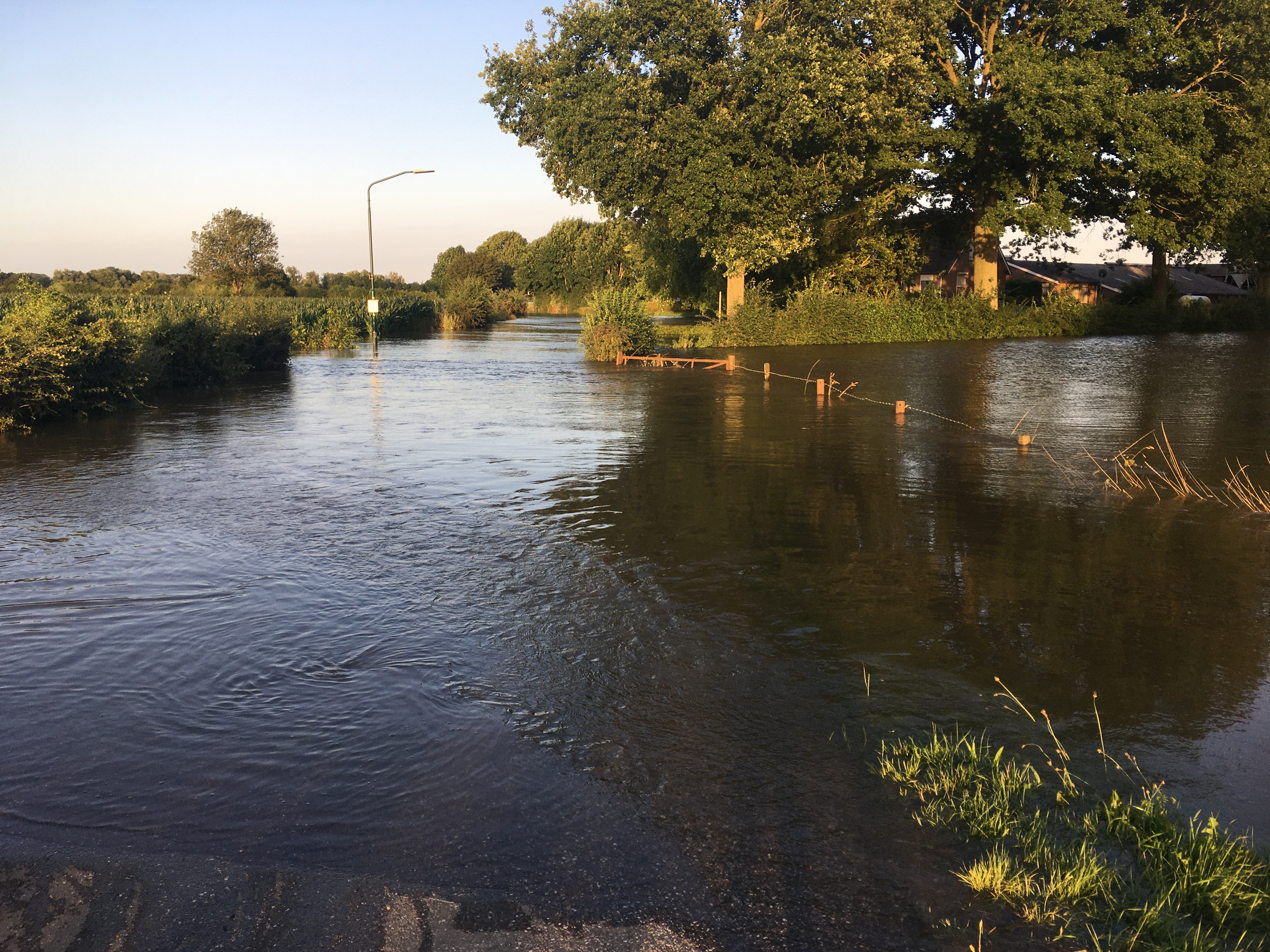
Street flooded by the Maas (July 2021)

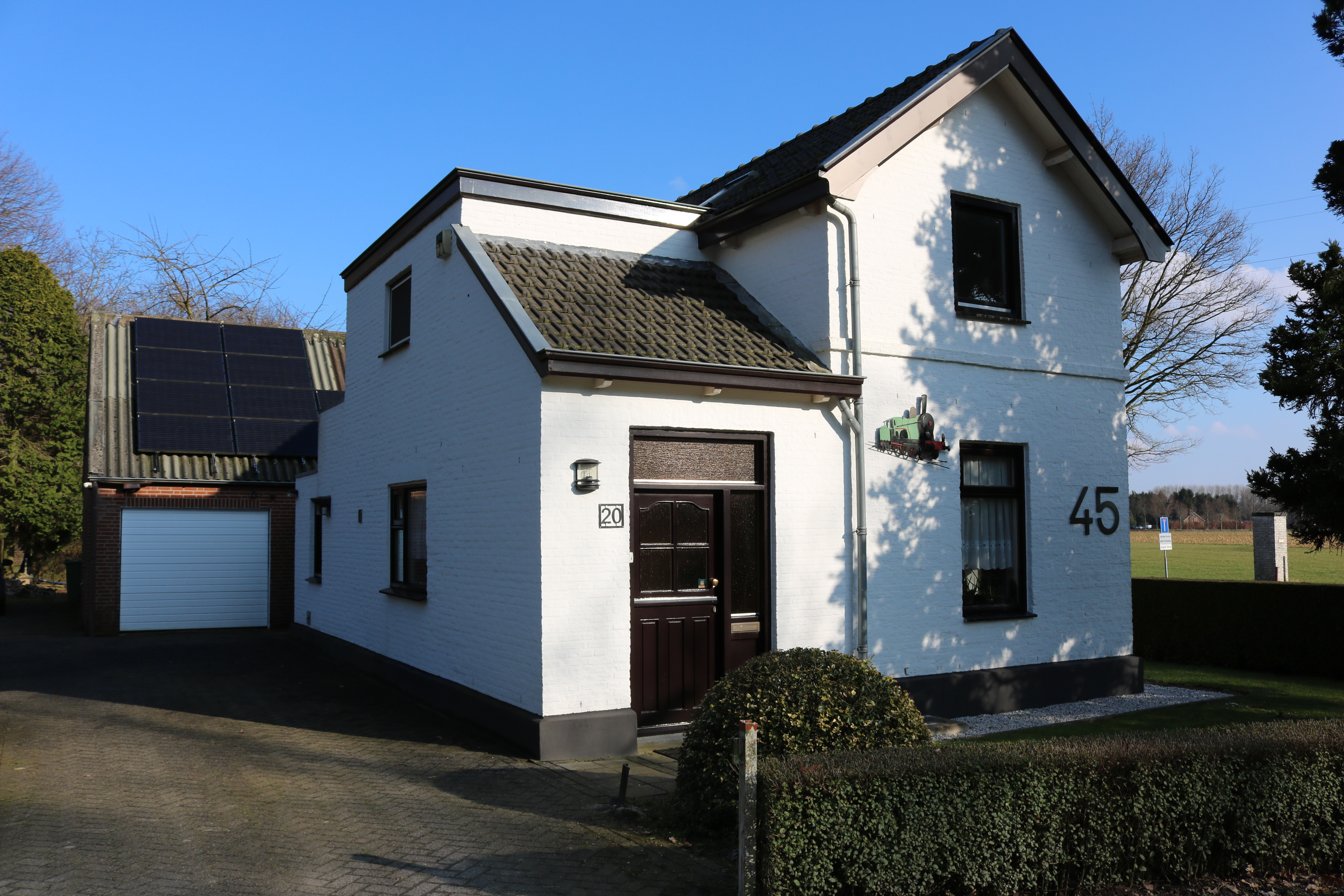
Former railway crossing guard house
