= Bas Mulder =

Dutch-Surinamese Catholic priest (1931–2020)

- Born: 17 July 1931; Beugen, Netherlands
- Died: 10 April 2020 (aged 88); Boxmeer, Netherlands
- Occupations: Priest and sports promoter

Sebastianus Adrianus Wilhelmus Rudolfus "Bas" Mulder (17 July 1931 – 10 April 2020) was a Dutch-Surinamese Catholic priest.

Mulder was born in Beugen near the town of Boxmeer in the Netherlands. As a missionary of the Catholic Church, Mulder moved from the Netherlands to Suriname in 1959.

After Surinamese independence in 1975, he also received Surinamese nationality. He would live there for 50 years, his entire active life. Mulder was known as a 'youth priest' and as a 'media priest' appearing on Radio Apintie and since 1966 STVS. He was important for the development of several sports in Suriname and was chairman of the Suriname Volleyball Association. He was also a long-distance runner. During the 1980 Surinamese coup d'état, when no newspapers were published, he wrote critical articles in the church magazine Omhoog.

As a priest Mulder was postulator for 30 years in the beatification of Peter Donders who had also served in Suriname. He considered the beatification of Donders by Pope John Paul II in 1982 a highlight of his career.

Mulder stayed in Suriname until 2009 and then retired in the Netherlands. He started living at a priests' community in Boxmeer. Mulder died on 10 April 2020 at the age of 88 due to COVID-19.
