= Oploo, Sint Anthonis en Ledeacker =

Coordinates: 51.624624°N 5.872879°E

Oploo, Sint Anthonis en Ledeacker was a municipality in the Dutch province of North Brabant. It was created in 1821, in a merger of Oploo and Sint Anthonis en Ledeacker. The municipality existed until 1994, when it became part of a larger municipality called St. Anthonis, changed into Sint Anthonis after a short time.

Since 2022 Sint Anthonis has been part of the new municipality of Land van Cuijk
