= Sint Anthonis =

- Village and former municipality
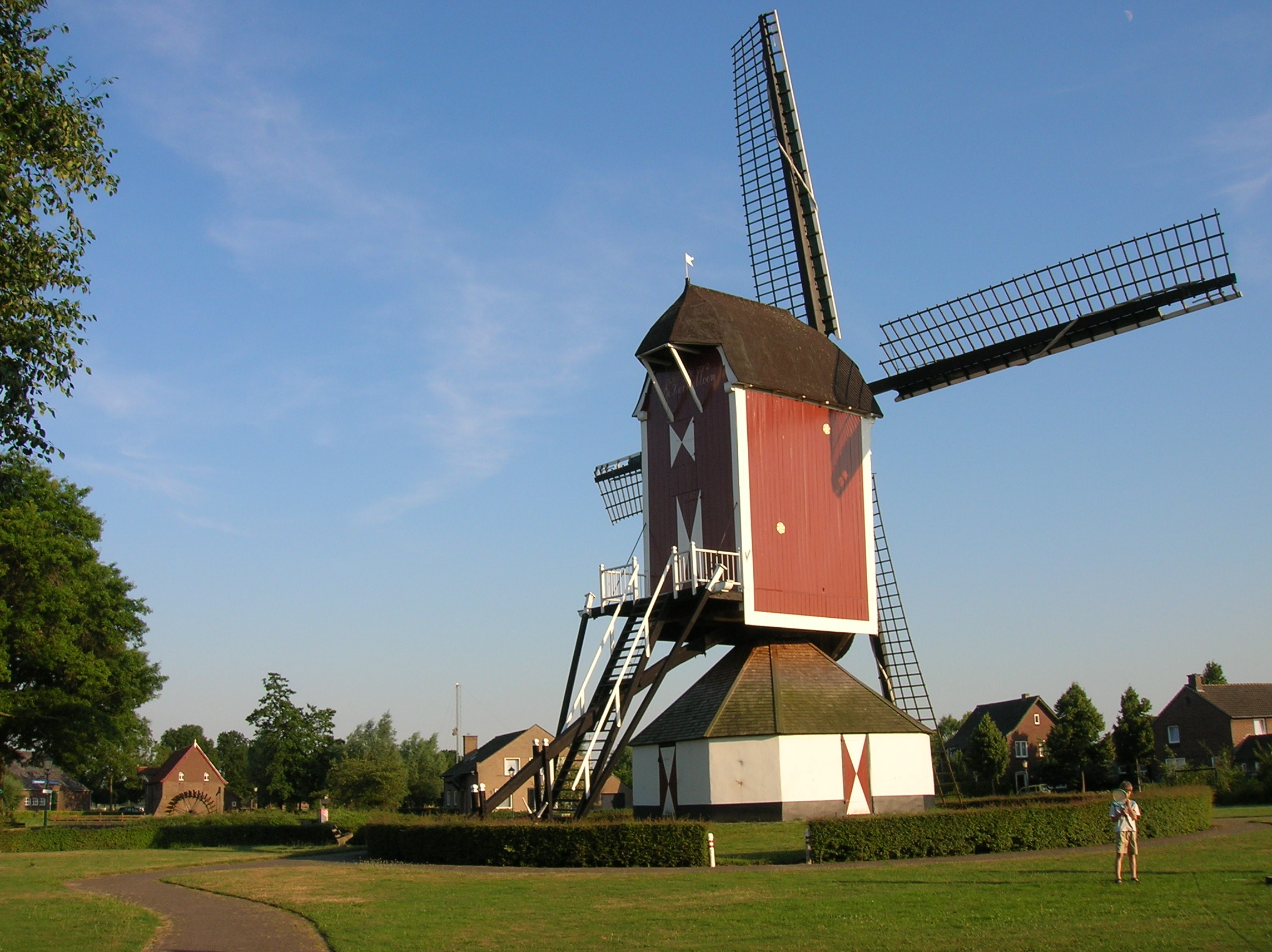
- Windmill in Oploo

- Flag Coat of arms

- Location of the former municipality of Sint Anthonis in North Brabant
- Coordinates: 51°38′N 5°53′E
- Country: Netherlands
- Province: North Brabant
- Municipality: Land van Cuijk

Area
  - Total: 23.57 km^{2} (9.10 sq mi)
- Elevation: 18 m (59 ft)

Population (2021)
  - Total: 4,775
  - Density: 202.6/km^{2} (524.7/sq mi)
- Time zone: UTC+1 (CET)
  - Summer (DST): UTC+2 (CEST)
- Postcode: 5845–5846
- Area code: 0485
- Website: www.sintanthonis.nl

Sint Anthonis (Dutch pronunciation: [ˈsɪnt ɑnˈtoːnɪs]) is a village and former municipality in the southern Netherlands in the Province of North Brabant. The locals refer to the town as Sint Tunnis. An inhabitant is called a "Sintunnisenaar". The former municipality had a population of 11,691 in 2021. Sint Anthonis, Boxmeer, Cuijk, Grave, and Mill en Sint Hubert merged into the new municipality of Land van Cuijk on 1 January 2022.

== History ==
The town was mentioned in a last will as early as 1312. The town was called Oelbroec at the time. As the church of St. Anthony The Abbot was completed in 1477, people started referring to the town as the "Parish of St. Anthony in Oelbroec", and by 1570 the name Oelbroec had disappeared. Church Book registration started in 1640 and are to be found on the BHIC web site.

Sint Anthonis was a part of the lordship of Boxmeer during the ancien régime. After the French rule, Sint Anthonis was parted from Boxmeer. Together with the village of Ledeacker it formed the municipality of "Sint Anthonis en Ledeacker". In 1821 Oploo joined this municipality, now called "Oploo, Sint Anthonis en Ledeacker". In 1913 this municipality had 1769 inhabitants, of which 906 men and 863 women, and of which 965 lived in the village of Sint Anthonis. The surface of the municipality existed of 3818 ha (with 46,33 inhabitants per km²).

On 1 January 1994 the municipality of Wanroij fused with the municipality of Oploo, Sint Anthonis en Ledeacker into the new municipality of Sint Anthonis. On 4 July 1994 also the name of the village was changed: St. Anthonis became Sint Anthonis.

== Population centres ==
- Landhorst
- Ledeacker
- Oploo
- De Walsert
- Sint Anthonis
- Stevensbeek
- Wanroij
- Westerbeek

=== Topography ===
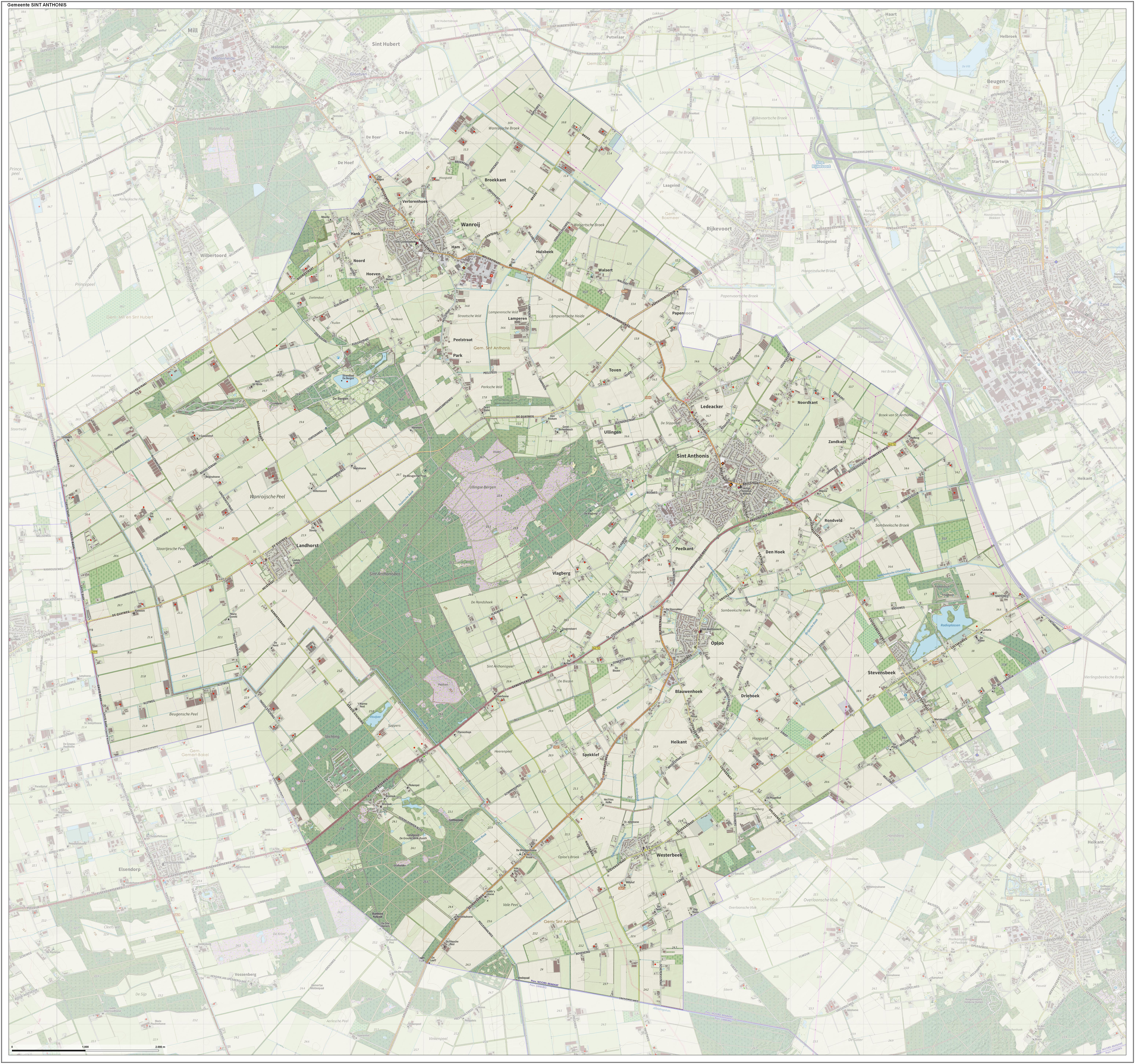

Map of the former municipality of Sint Anthonis, 2015

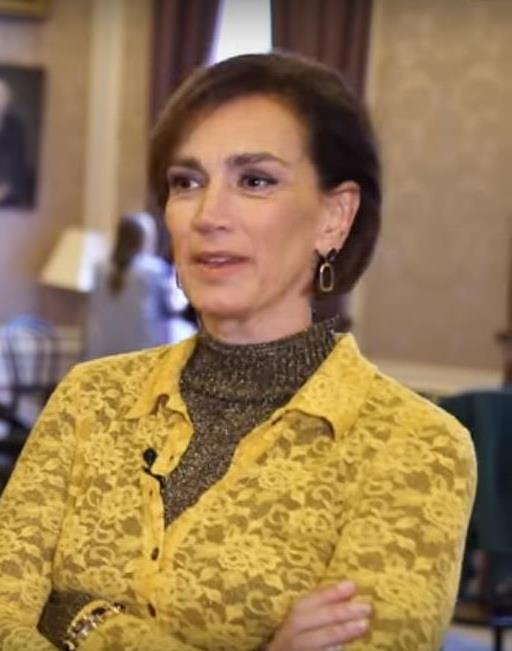
Monic Hendrickx, 2019

== Notable people ==
- Piet de Bekker (1921 in Empel – 2013) a Dutch politician.
- Dien Cornelissen (1924 in Oploo – 2015) a Dutch politician and social worker
- Monic Hendrickx (born 1966 in Sint Anthonis) a Dutch actress

=== Sport ===
- Piet van Katwijk (born 1950 n Oploo) a retired Dutch cyclist, competed at the 1972 Summer Olympics
- Fons van Katwijk (born 1951 in Oploo) a retired Dutch cyclist, competed at the 1976 Summer Olympics

== Gallery ==
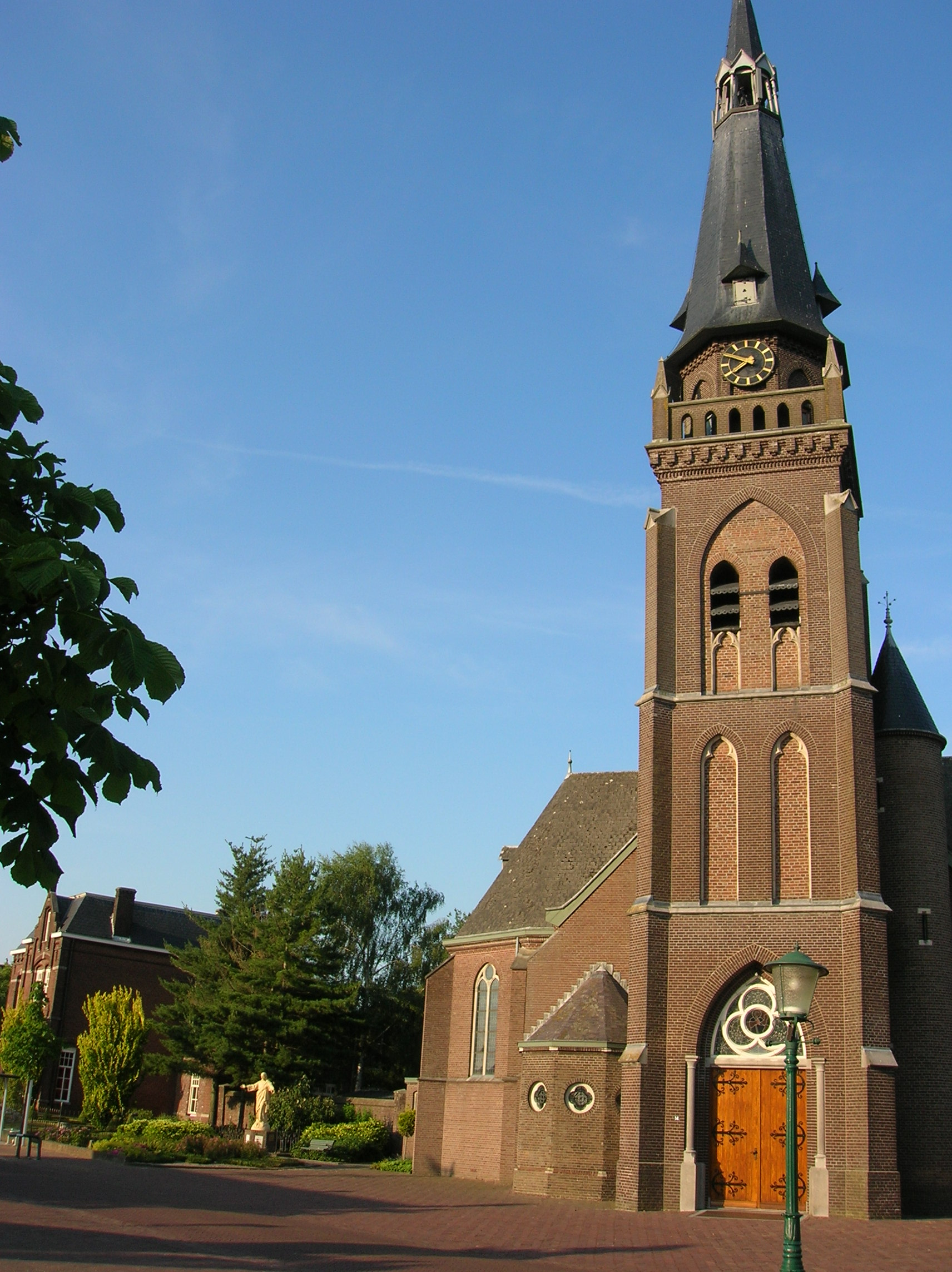
Oploo Kerk

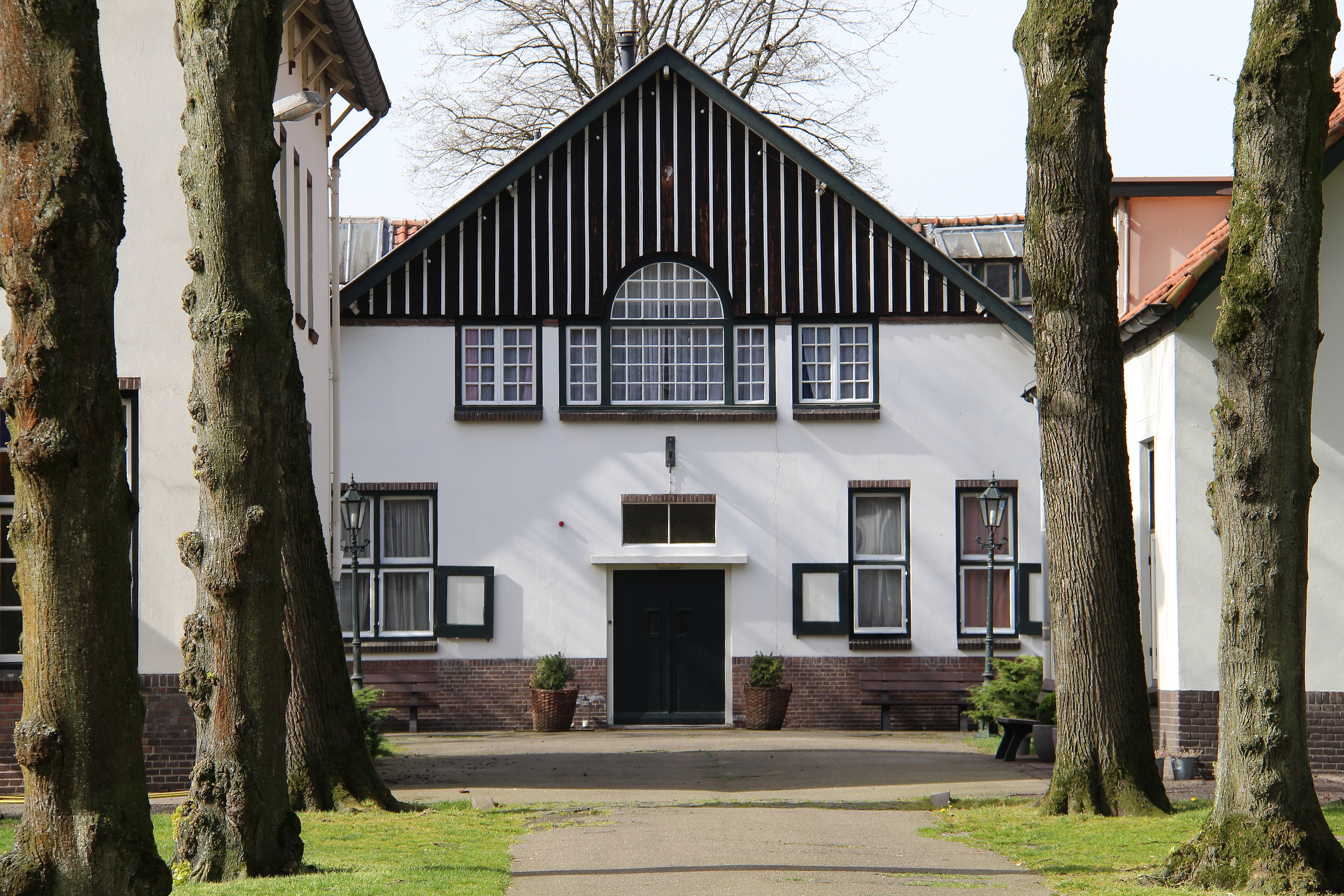
Stevensbeek - Kloosterstraat, Voormalige hooischuur

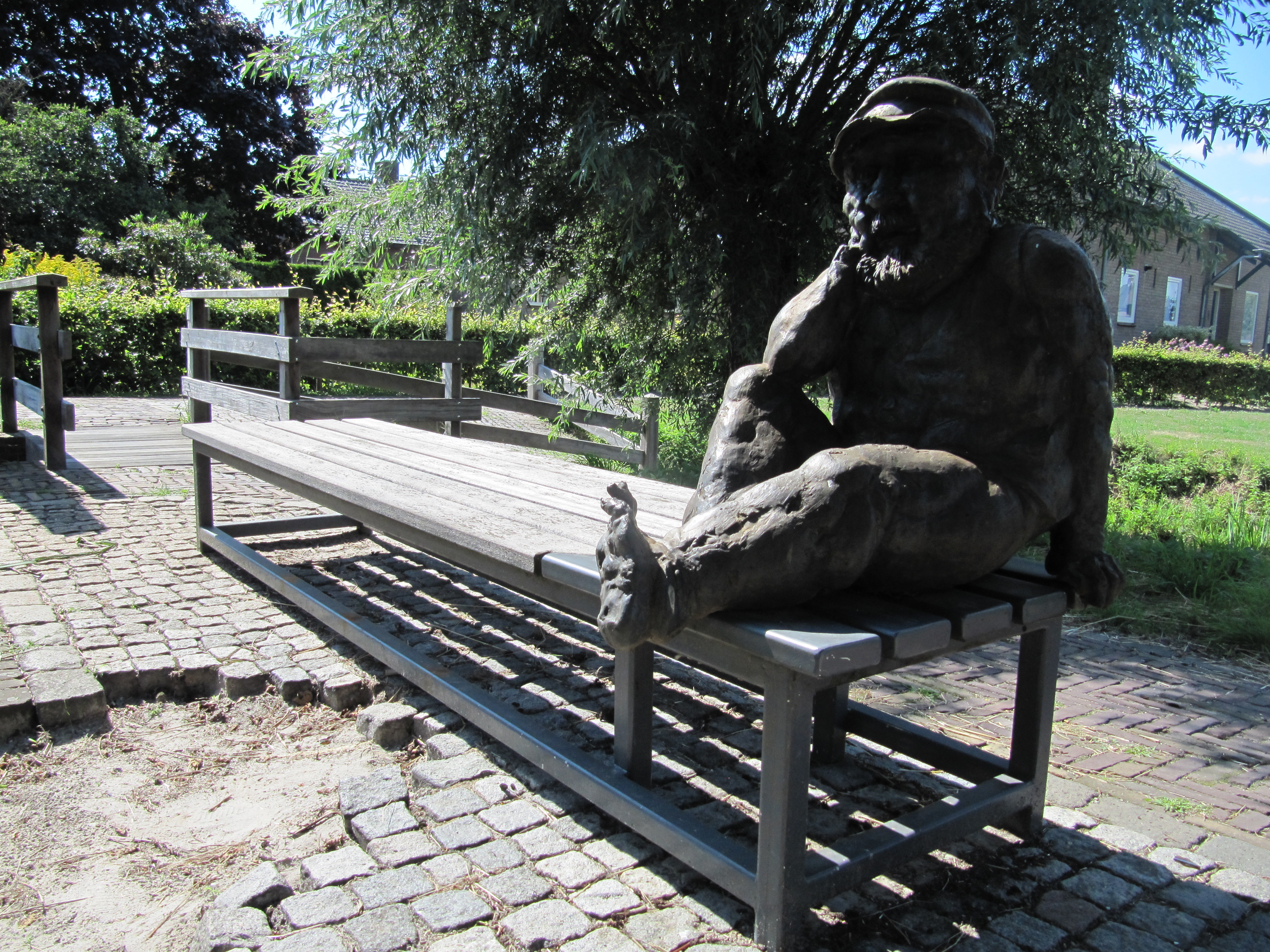
Statue of "Tôntje d'n Dwerg" in front of the water mill D'n Olliemeulen in Oploo

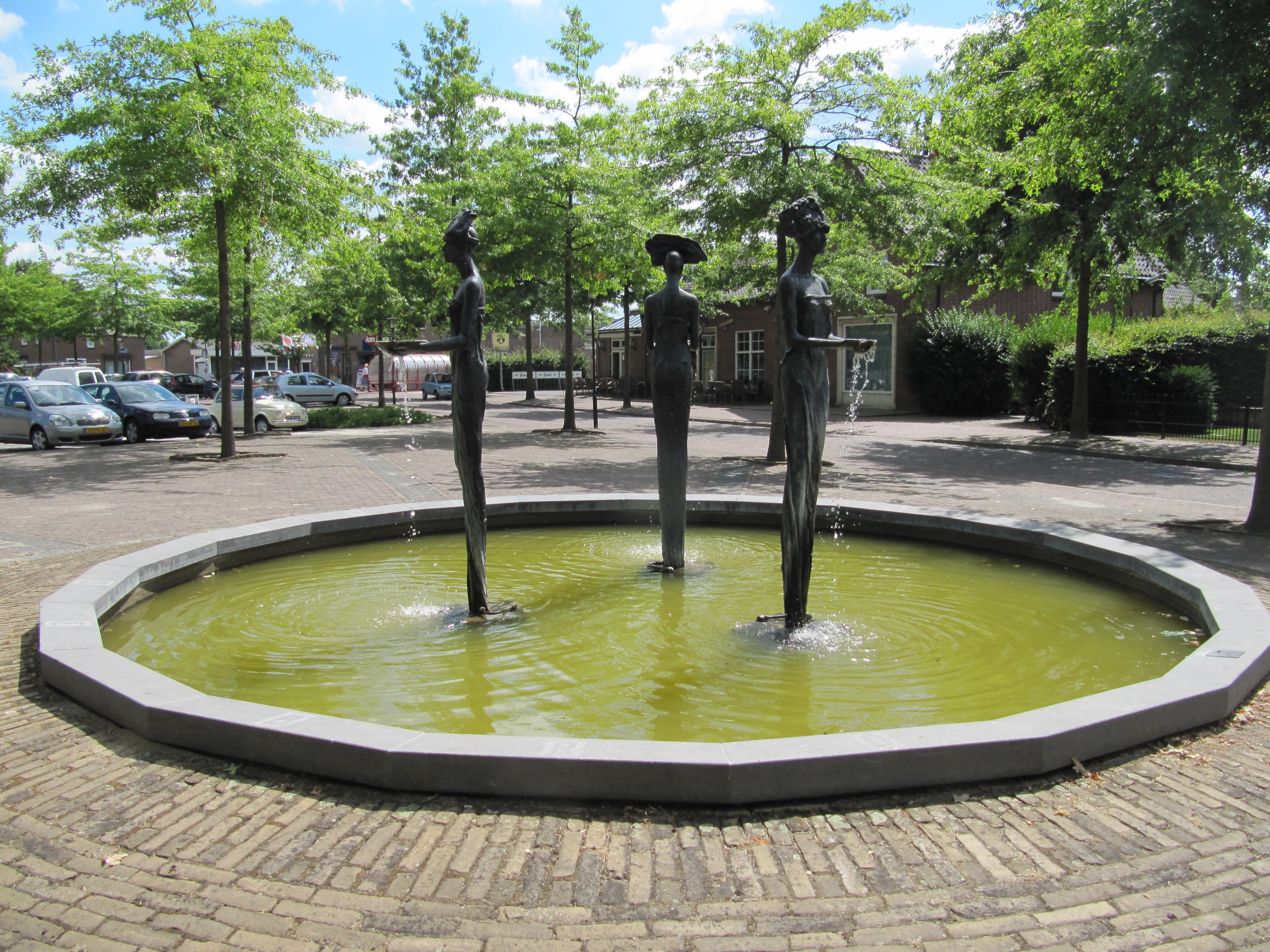
Sculpture "Vrouwen van de bron" at the Giesenplein in Wanroij
