= Oploo =

- Village
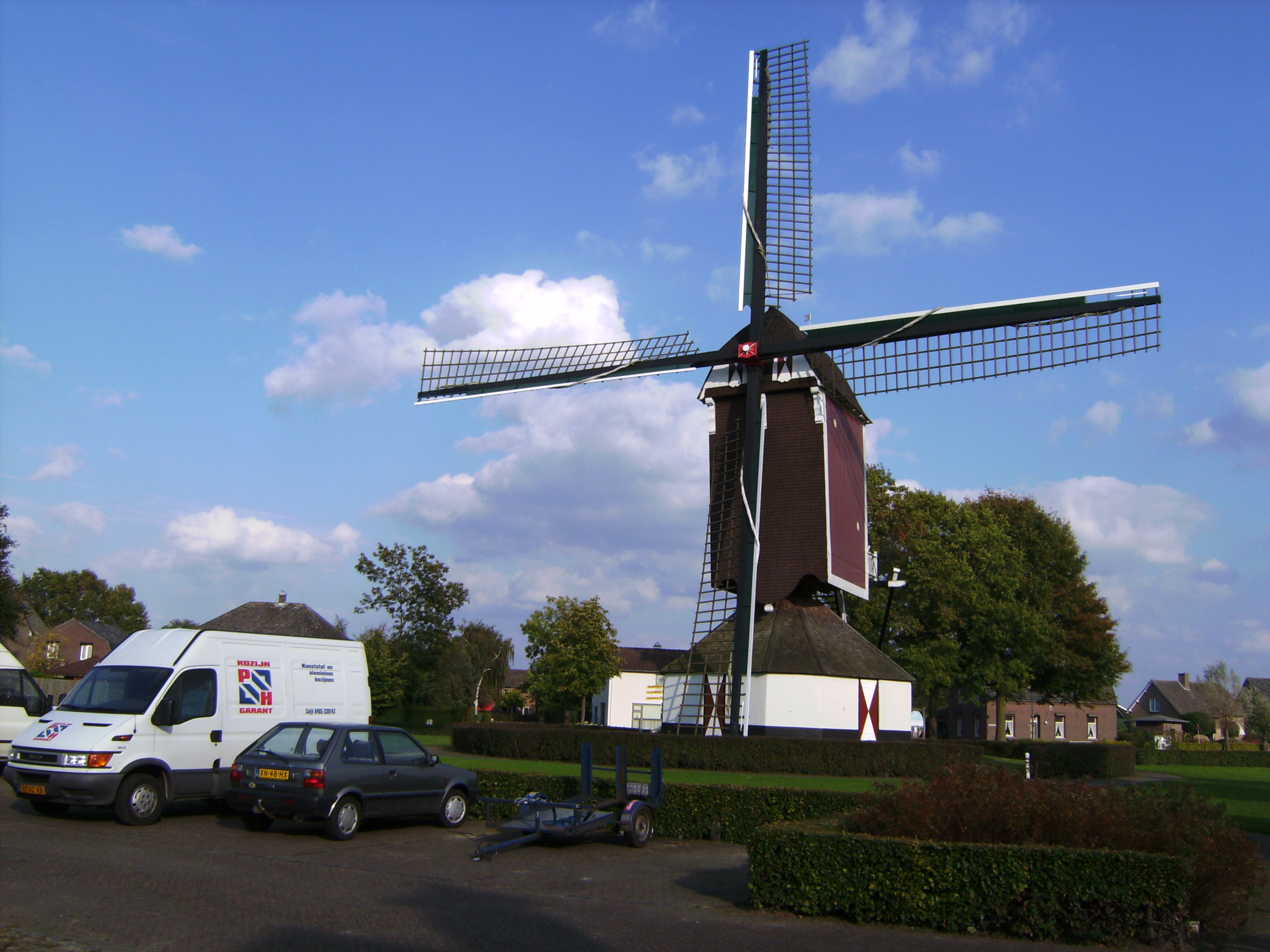
- Wind mill De Korenbloem

- Location in the province of North Brabant in the Netherlands Oploo (Netherlands)
- Coordinates: 51°36′32″N 5°52′25″E
- Country: Netherlands
- Province: North Brabant
- Municipality: Land van Cuijk

Area
  - Total: 21.43 km^{2} (8.27 sq mi)
- Elevation: 18 m (59 ft)

Population (2021)
  - Total: 1,895
  - Density: 88.43/km^{2} (229.0/sq mi)
- Time zone: UTC+1 (CET)
  - Summer (DST): UTC+2 (CEST)
- Postal code: 5841
- Dialing code: 0485

Oploo is a village in the Dutch province of North Brabant. It is located in the former municipality of Sint Anthonis. Since 2022 it has been part of the new municipality of Land van Cuijk.

== History ==
Oploo developed in the valley of a brook in the 12th or 13th century. There used to be two castle near Oploo, but both have disappeared. Of Bekenstein castle a farm remains with 16th century elements.

The grist mill De Korenbloem was moved to Oploo in 1843. It was known to be in 's-Hertogenbosch before 1663. The wind mill was in use until 1952. The municipality received the wind mill in emphyteusis in 1966, and later became full owner. It was restored the same year and is occasionally in use.

Oploo was a separate municipality until 1821, when it merged with Sint Anthonis en Ledeacker to form the new municipality of Oploo, Sint Anthonis en Ledeacker. Oploo was home to 482 people in 1840. In 2022, it became part of the municipality of Land van Cuijk.

== Gallery ==
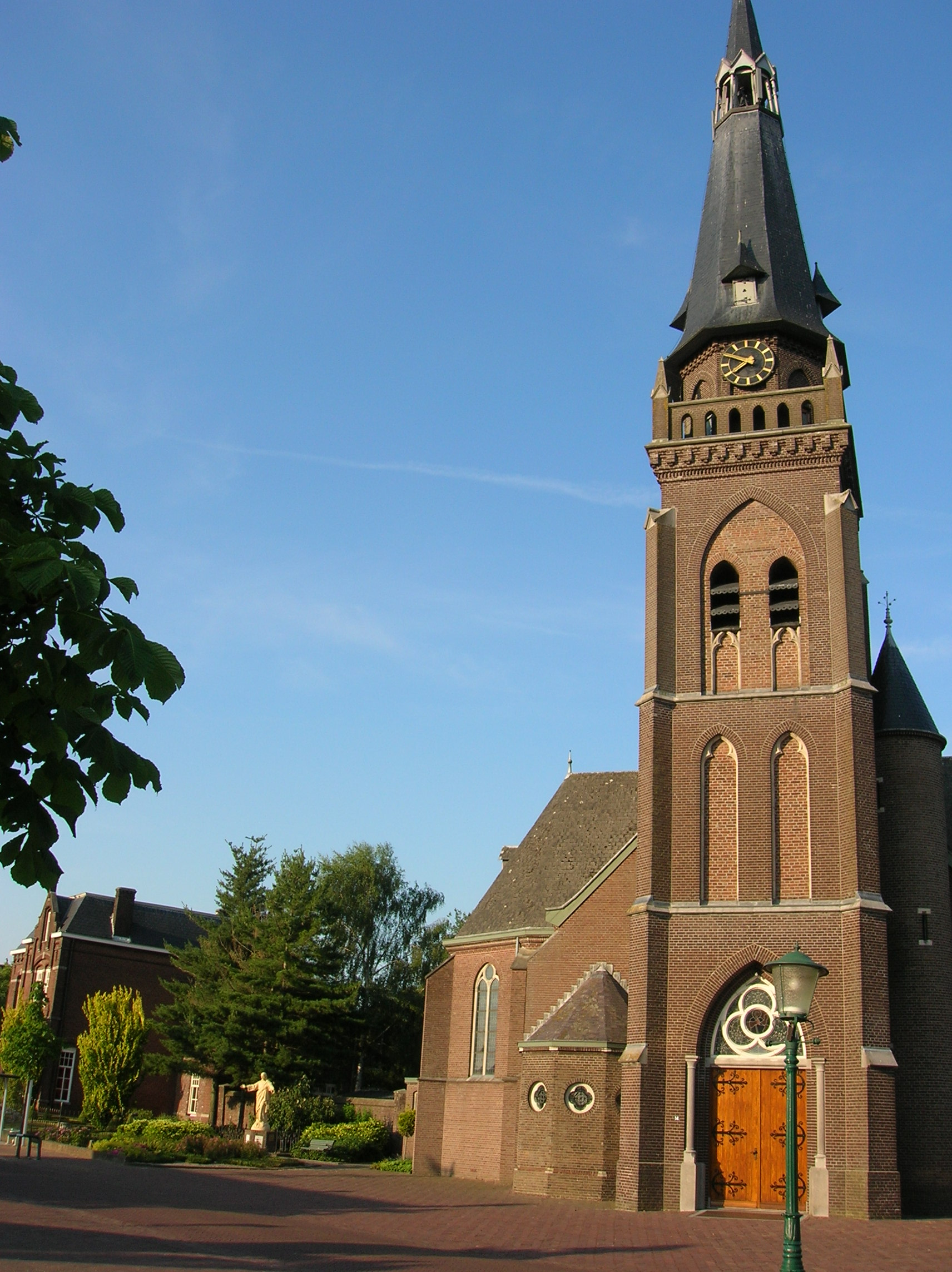
Church in Oploo

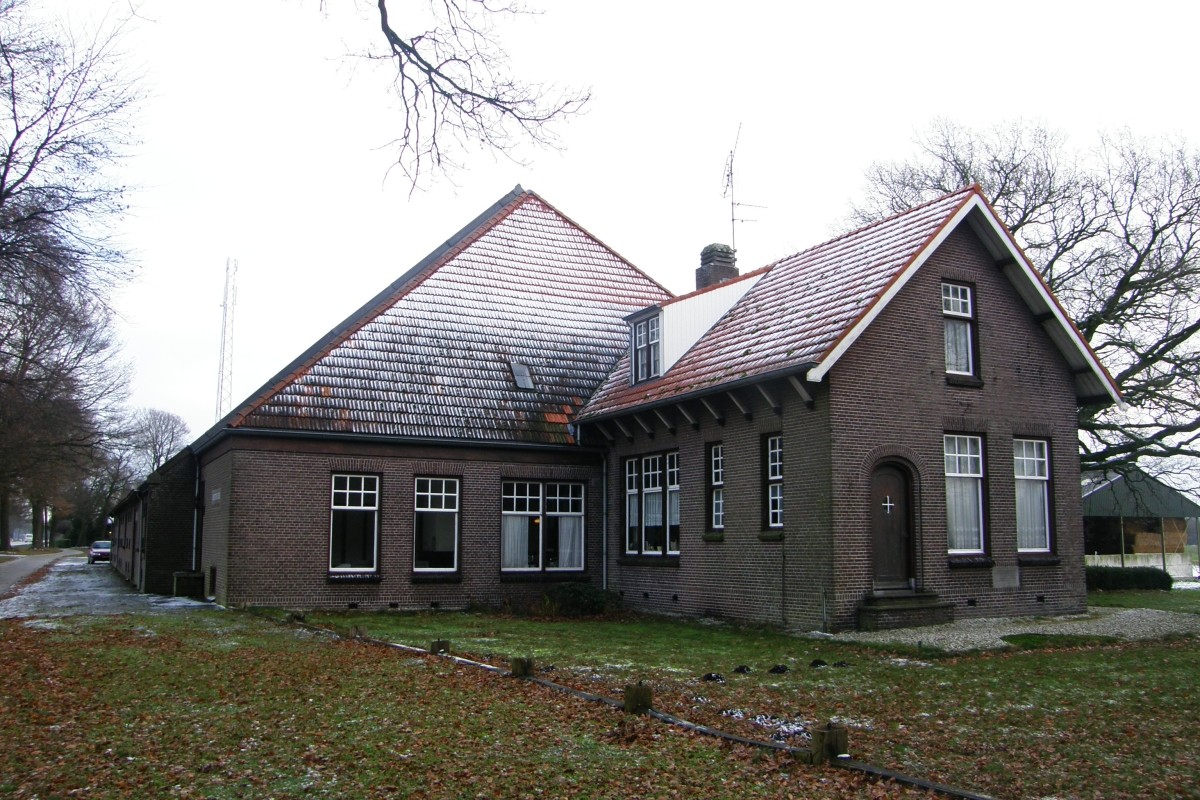
Farm in Oploo

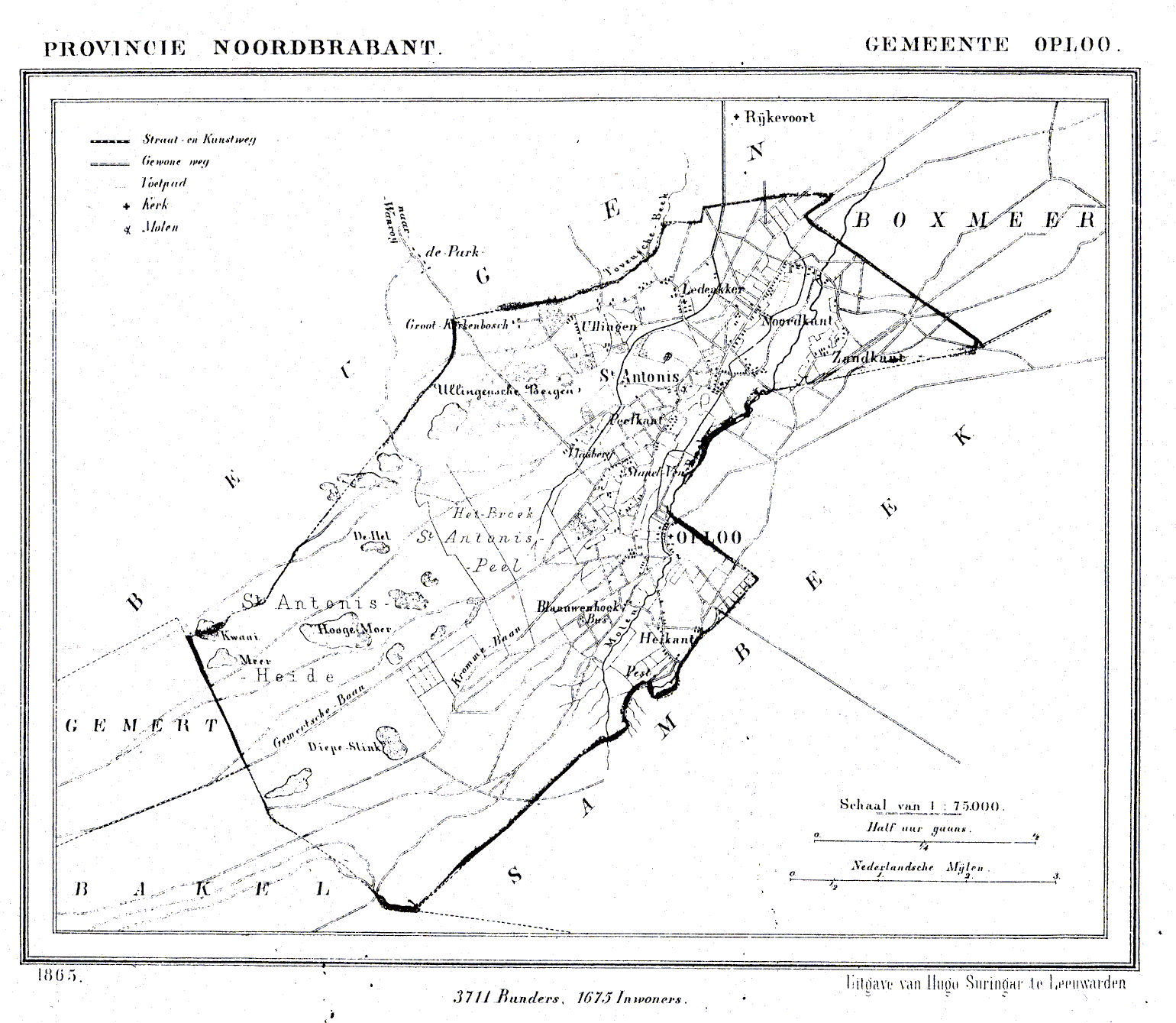
Map of 1865
