= Wanroij =

- Village
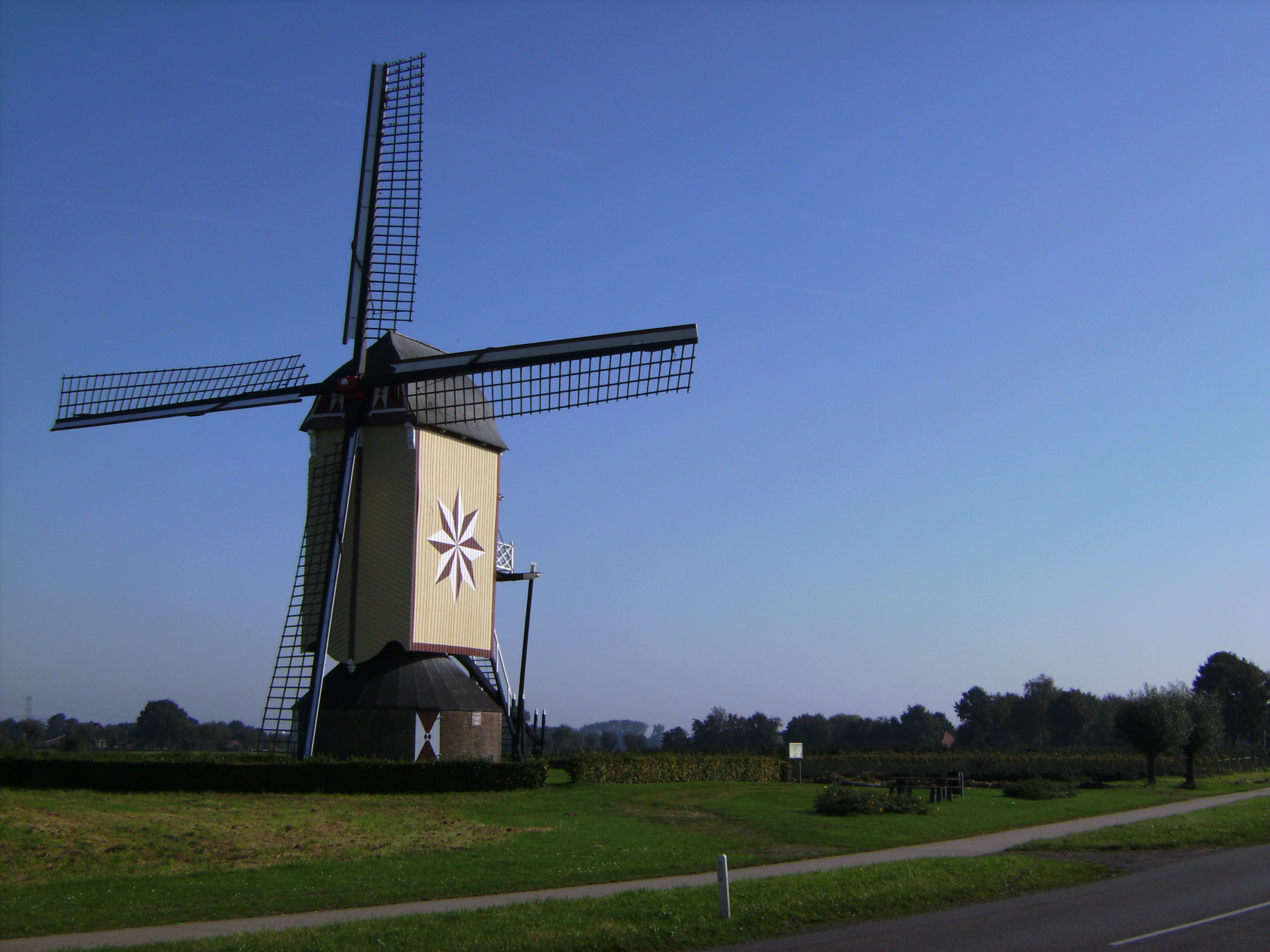
- Wind mill De Hamse molen

- Location in the province of North Brabant in the Netherlands Wanroij (Netherlands)
- Coordinates: 51°39′22″N 5°49′12″E
- Country: Netherlands
- Province: North Brabant
- Municipality: Land van Cuijk

Area
  - Total: 20.56 km^{2} (7.94 sq mi)
- Elevation: 14 m (46 ft)

Population (2021)
  - Total: 2,940
  - Density: 143/km^{2} (370/sq mi)
- Time zone: UTC+1 (CET)
  - Summer (DST): UTC+2 (CEST)
- Postal code: 5446
- Dialing code: 0485

Wanroij is a village in the Dutch province of North Brabant. It is located in the former municipality of Sint Anthonis, about 9 km west of the town of Boxmeer.

Wanroij was a separate municipality until 1994, when it became part of Sint Anthonis.

Since 2022 it has been part of the new municipality of Land van Cuijk.

== History ==
The name Wanroij was found first in 1265. A person called Bertradis van Wanrode signed, together with son Johan, a certificate.

From the French period on Wanroij was an individual municipality. In 1942 it was expanded with the villages Rijkevoort and Landhorst. In 1994 the area became part of a larger municipality, the municipality of Sint Anthonis. Rijkevoort then became part of the municipality of Boxmeer.

The church in Wanroij was named after the Pope Cornelius. Until 1994 Cornelius was represented in the flag of the municipality.

For a long period of time Wanroij was very isolated. Around 1850 the infrastructure developed a lot. The first street lanterns were placed in 1922. The first road which was not just a path to other villages was made in 1922, going from Wanroij to Haps.

== Gallery ==
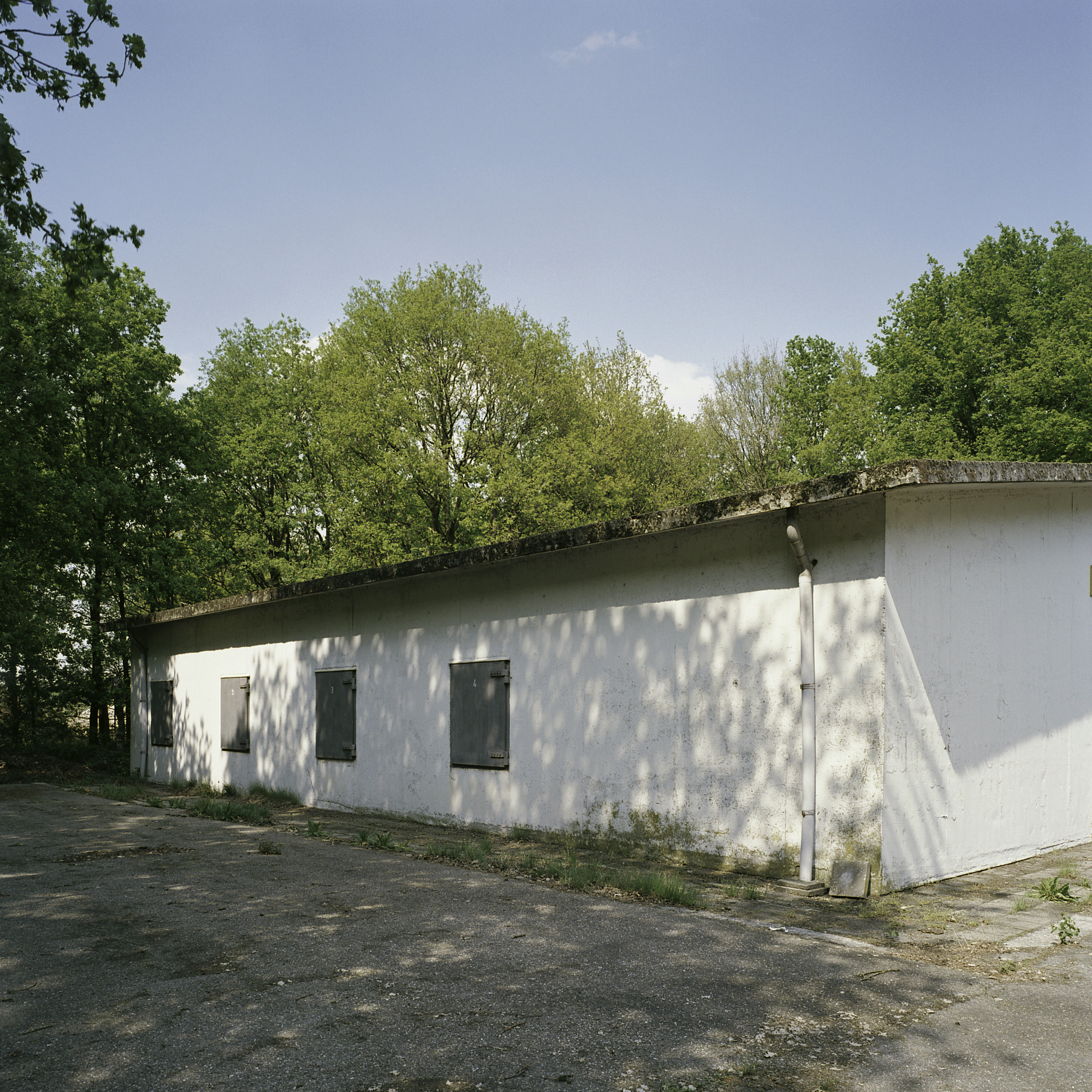
Storage shed

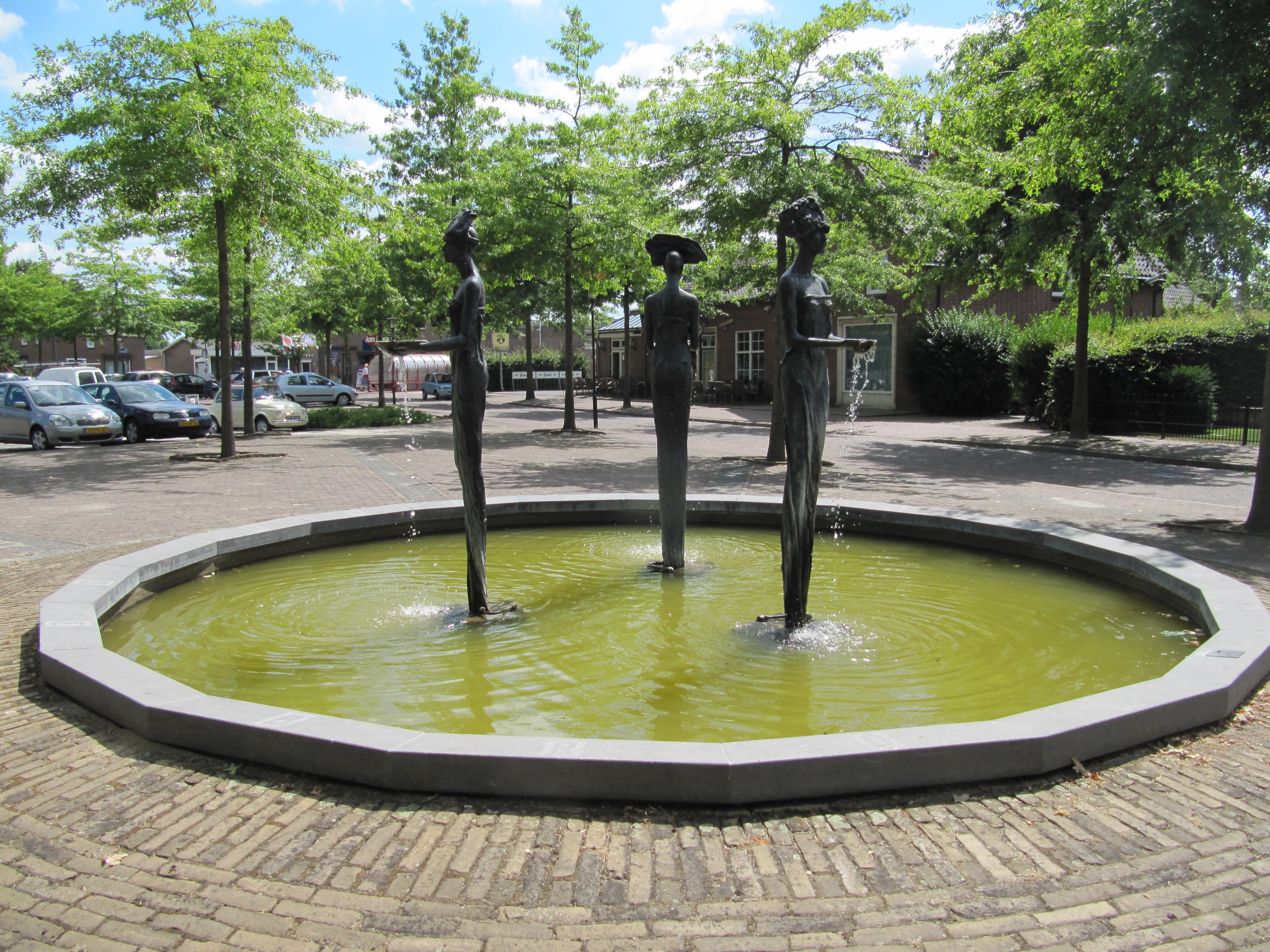
Sculpture in the square

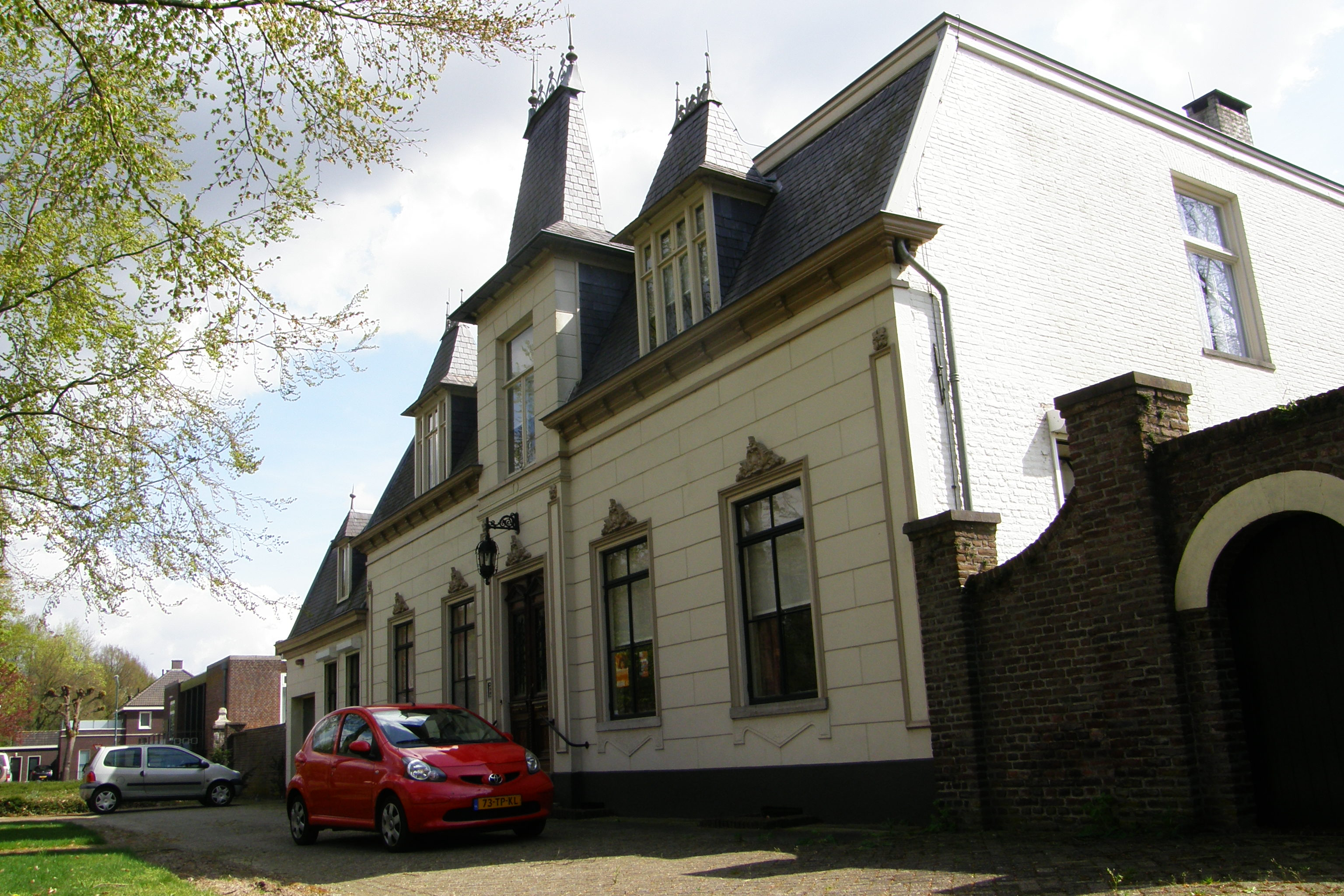
Clergy house
