= 21st Army Group =

WWII United Kingdom military formation

- Formation badge designed by General Sir Bernard Paget DSO, MC 1943
- Active: 1943–45
- Country: United Kingdom
- Branch: British Army
- Type: Army Group
- Size: 1,020,581 officers and men (excluding US forces); 9,248 tanks 6,584 artillery pieces 1,600 aircraft (2nd Tactical Air Force)
- Part of: Allied Expeditionary Force
- Engagements: World War II; Western Front; Operation Market Garden; Battle of the Nijmegen salient

Commanders
- Notable commanders: Bernard Paget; Bernard Montgomery

The 21st Army Group was a British headquarters formation formed during the Second World War. It controlled two field armies and other supporting units, consisting primarily of the British Second Army and the First Canadian Army. Established in London during July 1943, under the command of Supreme Headquarters Allied Expeditionary Force (SHAEF), it was assigned to Operation Overlord, the Western Allied invasion of Europe, and was an important Allied force in the European Theatre. At various times during its existence, the 21st Army Group had additional British, Canadian, American, and Polish field armies or corps attached to it. The 21st Army Group operated in Northern France, Luxembourg, Belgium, the Netherlands and Germany from June 1944 until August 1945, when it was renamed the British Army of the Rhine (BAOR).

== Western European theatre ==
=== Normandy ===
Commanded by General Sir Bernard Montgomery, 21st Army Group initially controlled all ground forces in Operation Overlord (the United States First Army and British Second Army). When sufficient American forces had landed, their own 12th Army Group was activated, under General Omar Bradley, and the 21st Army Group was left with the British Second Army and the newly activated First Canadian Army which, despite its title, also contained many British and Polish troops.

Normandy was a battle of attrition for the British and Canadian troops, drawing in most of the available German reinforcements, especially armoured divisions, around Caen at the eastern end of the lodgement. These operations left the Germans unable to prevent the American breakout at the western end of the Normandy beachhead in early August 1944. Following the German attack towards Mortain, the American breakout and an advance by the 21st Army Group the German armed forces in Normandy were nearly enveloped in the Falaise pocket, and subsequently routed, retreating towards the Low Countries.

=== Advance into the Low Countries ===
After the successful landings in the south of France by the US 6th Army Group, the 21st Army Group formed the left flank of the three Allied army groups arrayed against German forces in the West. It was therefore responsible for securing the ports upon which Allied supply depended, and also with overrunning German V-1 and V-2 launching sites along the coasts of western France and Belgium.

By 29 August, the Germans had largely withdrawn across the Seine River without their heavy equipment. The campaign through Northern France and Belgium was largely a pursuit, with the ports – formally designated "Fortress Towns" by the Germans – offering only limited opposition to the First Canadian Army. The advance was so rapid, 250 miles in four days, that Antwerp, Belgium, was captured undefended on 4 September 1944 and the port facilities were cleared of the German defenders in the following days.

On 1 September 1944, the 21st Army Group was relieved of operational control of the American armies, and those armies formed the 12th Army Group. At the same time, Montgomery was promoted to Field Marshal.

By mid-September, elements of 21st Army Group had reached the Dutch border, but were halted due to lack of supplies, and by flooding caused by the widespread German demolition of Dutch dikes. German control of some of the channel ports and the approaches to Antwerp, and previous Allied bombing of the French and Belgian railways, resulted in a long supply line from Normandy served mainly by trucks.

=== Operation Market Garden ===
After the break-out from Normandy, there were high hopes that the war could be ended in 1944. In order to do so, the last great natural defensive barrier of Germany in the west, the Rhine River had to be crossed. Operation Market Garden was orchestrated to attempt just this. It was staged in the Netherlands with the airborne troops of the American 82nd and 101st and one British 1st airborne divisions and the 1st Polish Parachute Brigade (attached to the 1st Airborne Division) being dropped to capture bridges over the lower Rhine before they could be blown by the Germans. The airborne formations were then to be relieved by armoured forces of the Guards Armoured Division advancing rapidly northwards through Eindhoven and Nijmegen to Arnhem, opening the north German plains, and the industrial Ruhr Valley, to the Allies.

However, the British armoured forces had only one main highway to operate on, and crucial information about the German forces in the operational area was either missing or ignored. The scratch forces remaining after the retreat from France were much stronger than expected, thus giving the armoured units of the XXX Corps a much tougher fight than had been anticipated, slowing the advance. The 1st British Airborne Division in Arnhem was practically destroyed during the battle.

The advance stopped south of the Lower Rhine, resulting in a narrow salient that ran from the north of Belgium across the south-east of the Netherlands and was vulnerable to attack. German assaults in this salient, particularly north of Nijmegen were repelled.

The thin salient was then expanded Eastwards with Operation Aintree which saw bitter fighting around the town of Overloon. To the West Operation Pheasant was conducted which resulted in the liberation of the cities of Tilburg and 's-Hertogenbosch broadening the front line.

=== Battle of the Scheldt ===
Since the approaches to the port of Antwerp had not been cleared when the city was captured it had allowed the German army time to reorganise and dig in along the approaches making the port completely unusable. Thus an operation was needed to clear the approaches and thereby ease the supply problem. The island of Walcheren was strongly held by German forces and commanded the estuary of the Scheldt which flows through Antwerp. Operations by II Canadian Corps cleared the approaches to Antwerp both north and south of the water during the Battle of the Scheldt. Walcheren itself was captured in late 1944 by the last major amphibious assault in Europe in the Second World War. A combination of British and Canadian forces and Royal Marines undertook the operation.

=== Battle of the Bulge ===
After the capture of Walcheren came the last great German offensive of the war in the west. In a repeat of their 1940 attack, German formations smashed through weak Allied lines in the Ardennes in Belgium. The Battle of the Bulge presented a command problem to General Eisenhower. It had sliced through US lines, leaving some American formations north and south of the new German salient. However, the headquarters of the US 12th Army Group lay to the south, and so Eisenhower decided to place American forces north of the "Bulge" salient under 21st Army Group. They, with the US Third Army under General George S. Patton, reduced the salient.

After the battle, control of the First US Army which had been placed under Field Marshal Montgomery's temporary command was returned to Bradley's 12th Army Group. The US Ninth Army remained under Montgomery longer, before being returned to American command in Germany.

=== Battle for the Roer Triangle ===
Prior to the Rhineland Campaign the enemy had to be cleared from the Roer Triangle during Operation Blackcock. This large methodical mopping up operation took place between 14 and 27 January 1945. It was not planned to make any deep thrust into the enemy defences or capture large numbers of prisoners. It proceeded from stage to stage almost entirely as planned and was completed with minimal casualties.

=== Rhineland Campaign ===
Allied forces closed up to the Rhine by March 1945. 21st Army Group at this time comprised the British Second Army under General Miles Dempsey, the First Canadian Army under General Harry Crerar and the US Ninth Army, under General William Simpson.

The First Canadian Army executed Operation Veritable in difficult conditions from Nijmegen eastwards through the Reichswald Forest then southwards. This was to have been the northern part of a pincer movement with the US Ninth Army moving northwards towards Düsseldorf and Krefeld (Operation Grenade), to clear the west bank of the Rhine north of Cologne. However the Americans were delayed by two weeks when the Germans destroyed the Roer dams and flooded the American route of advance. As a result, the Canadians engaged and mauled the German reserves intended to defend the Cologne Plain.

In Operation Plunder, starting on 13 March 1945, the British Second Army and the US Ninth Army crossed the Rhine at various places north of the Ruhr and German resistance in the west quickly crumbled. The First Canadian Army wheeled left and liberated the northern part of the Netherlands and captured adjoining areas of Germany, the British Second Army occupied much of north-west Germany and the US Ninth Army formed the northern arm of the envelopment of German forces in the Ruhr Pocket and on 4 April reverted to Omar Bradley's 12th Army Group.

On 4 May 1945, Field Marshal Montgomery accepted the unconditional surrender of the German forces in the Netherlands, in north west Germany and Denmark.

== British Army of the Rhine ==
After the German surrender, 21st Army Group was converted into the headquarters for the British occupation zone in Germany. It was renamed the British Army of the Rhine (BAOR) on 25 August 1945 and eventually formed the nucleus of the British forces stationed in Germany throughout the Cold War.

== Order of battle ==
The main constituent formations of 21st Army Group were the First Canadian Army and the British Second Army. In practice, neither of the two armies were homogeneously British or Canadian. Also included was the Polish I Corps, from Normandy onwards and small Dutch, Belgian, and Czechoslovak units; units of the US Army were attached from time to time.

- 21st Army Group (Field Marshal Bernard Montgomery)
  - British Second Army (Lieutenant-General Sir Miles Dempsey)
    - VIII Corps (Lieutenant-General Sir Richard O'Connor)
      - Guards Armoured Division
      - 3rd Infantry Division
      - 5th Infantry Division (arrived from Italy in March 1945)
      - 15th (Scottish) Infantry Division
    - XII Corps (Lieutenant-General Sir Neil Ritchie)
      - 11th Armoured Division
      - 51st (Highland) Infantry Division
      - 53rd (Welsh) Infantry Division
    - XXX Corps (Lieutenant-General Gerard Bucknall (June-August 1944); Lieutenant-General Brian Horrocks (from August 1944)
      - 7th Armoured Division
      - 43rd (Wessex) Infantry Division
      - 52nd (Lowland) Infantry Division
  - First Canadian Army (Lieutenant-General Harry Crerar)
    - II Canadian Corps (Lieutenant-General Guy Simonds)
      - 2nd Canadian Division
      - 3rd Canadian Division
      - 4th Canadian (Armoured) Division
      - 1st Armoured Division (Poland)
    - I Canadian Corps (Lieutenant-General Charles Foulkes) (arrived from Italy in March 1945)
      - 1st Canadian Division
      - 5th Canadian (Armoured) Division
      - 49th (West Riding) Infantry Division (assigned to I Canadian Corps in March 1945)
    - I Corps (Lieutenant-General Sir John Crocker) (Command of LOS units and formations 1945)
1. Returned to UK or disbanded during the campaign
- 59th (Staffordshire) Infantry Division (disbanded in August 1944)
- 50th (Northumbrian) Infantry Division (returned to England in November 1944 to become a training division)

=== Attached US units ===
21st Army Group had American units attached at various times:

1. The US First Army formed part of the 21st Army Group during the Battle of Normandy in June and July 1944
2. During Operation Market Garden, two US airborne divisions (the 101st and 82nd), were deployed as part of the First Allied Airborne Army from September to December 1944.
3. During Operation Pheasant, the British I Corps was reinforced by the US 104th Infantry Division.
4. During Operation Clipper, the US 84th Infantry Division was temporarily attached to the British XXX Corps
5. During the Battle of the Bulge, the US First and Ninth Armies on the north face of the bulge came under the control of the 21st Army Group.
6. The US Ninth Army remained part of 21st Army Group during the drive to the Rhine (Operations Veritable and Grenade), the Rhine crossings (Operation Plunder) and the battle of the Ruhr Pocket until April 1945.
7. The US 17th Airborne Division also took part in the Rhine crossings as part of Operation Varsity in March 1945.
8. In April and May 1945, the US XVIII Airborne Corps, with the US 8th Infantry Division, 82nd Airborne Division and 7th Armored Divisions, was attached to the 21st Army Group for the drive from the Elbe to the Baltic Sea.

== Commanders ==
- June 1943 – December 1943 General Bernard Paget
- January 1944 – August 1945 General Bernard Montgomery

== General sources ==
- MacDonald, Charles B. (1984). A Time for Trumpets: The Untold Story of the Battle of the Bulge. Bantam Books. ISBN 0-553-34226-6.
- Middlebrook, Martin (1994). Arnhem 1944: The Airborne Battle. Viking. ISBN 0-670-83546-3.
- Williams, A. (2004). D-Day to Berlin. London: Hodder & Stoughton. ISBN 0-340-83397-1.
