= Groeningen =

- Village
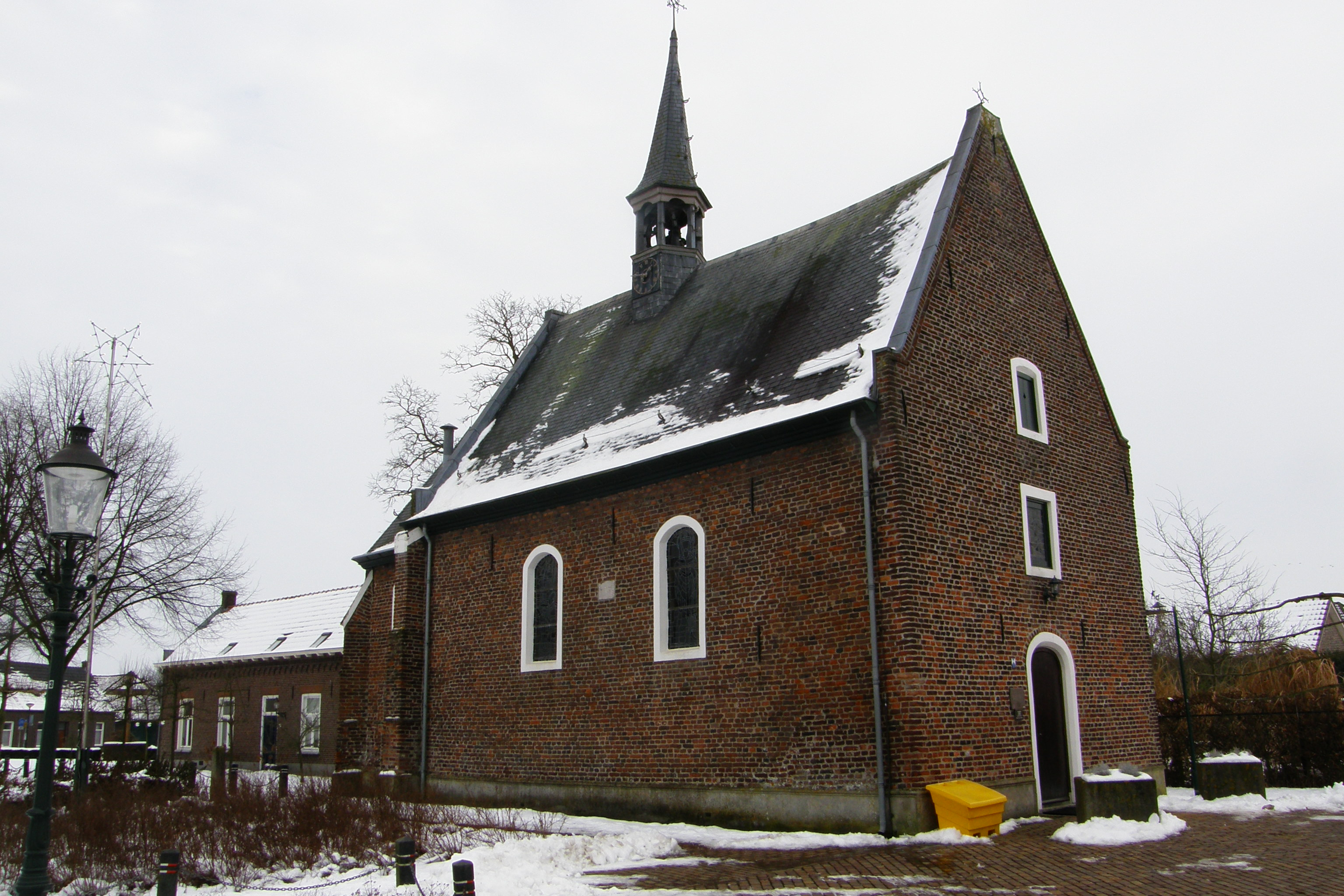
- Chapel in Groeningen

- Location in the province of North Brabant in the Netherlands Groeningen (Netherlands)
- Coordinates: 51.6058°N 5.9959°E
- Country: Netherlands
- Province: North Brabant
- Municipality: Land van Cuijk

Area
  - Total: 15.99 km^{2} (6.17 sq mi)
- Elevation: 15 m (49 ft)

Population (2021)
  - Total: 670
  - Density: 42/km^{2} (110/sq mi)
- Time zone: UTC+1 (CET)
  - Summer (DST): UTC+2 (CEST)
- Postal code: 5826
- Dialing code: 0478

Groeningen is a village in the municipality of Land van Cuijk in the province of North Brabant, Netherlands.

== History ==
The village is first mentioned in 1459 as Grunenhem, and means "settlement of the people of Gruno (person)". Groeningen is an agricultural community which centred around a triangular pasture with a pool of drinking water.

The Castle de Voirt was built in the 16th century. It was demolished in 1806, and replaced by a farm in 1839. A chapel was built in Groeningen in the 15th century, but the village did not become an independent parish.

Groeningen was home to 443 people in 1840. The village used to part of the municipality of Vierlingsbeek. In 1998, it became part of Boxmeer, and in 2022, Land van Cuijk.

== Gallery ==
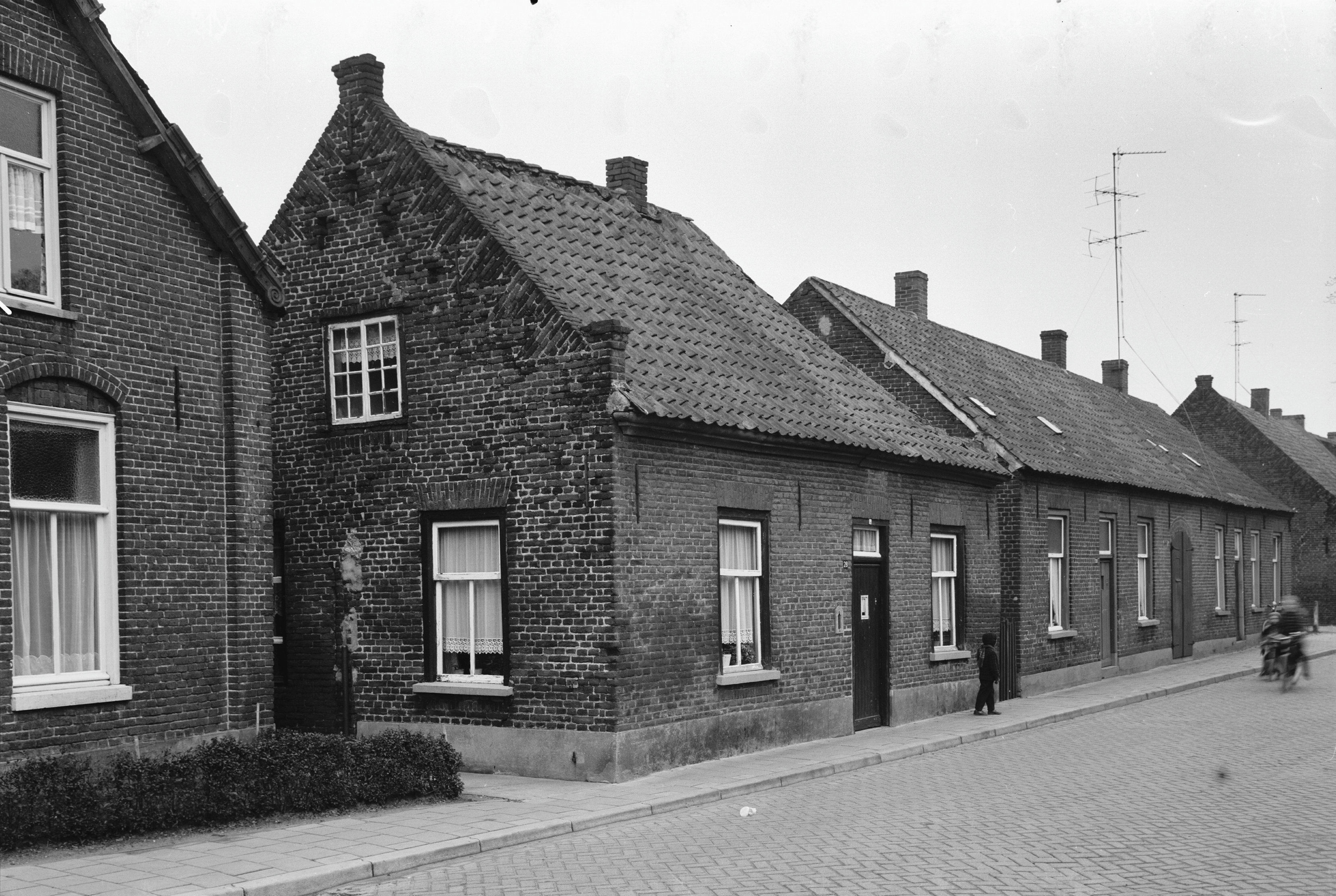
Houses in Groeningen

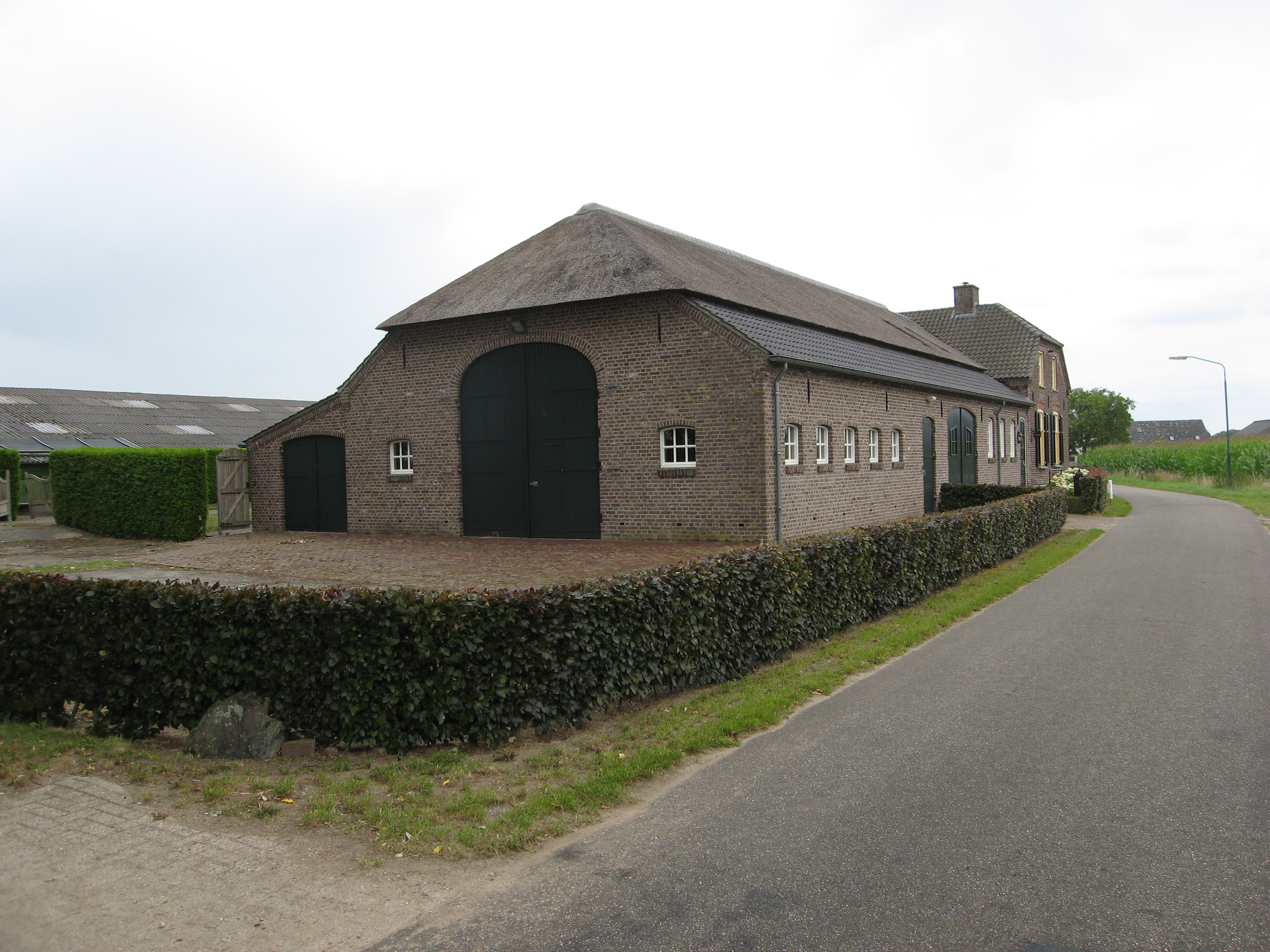
Farm in Groeningen

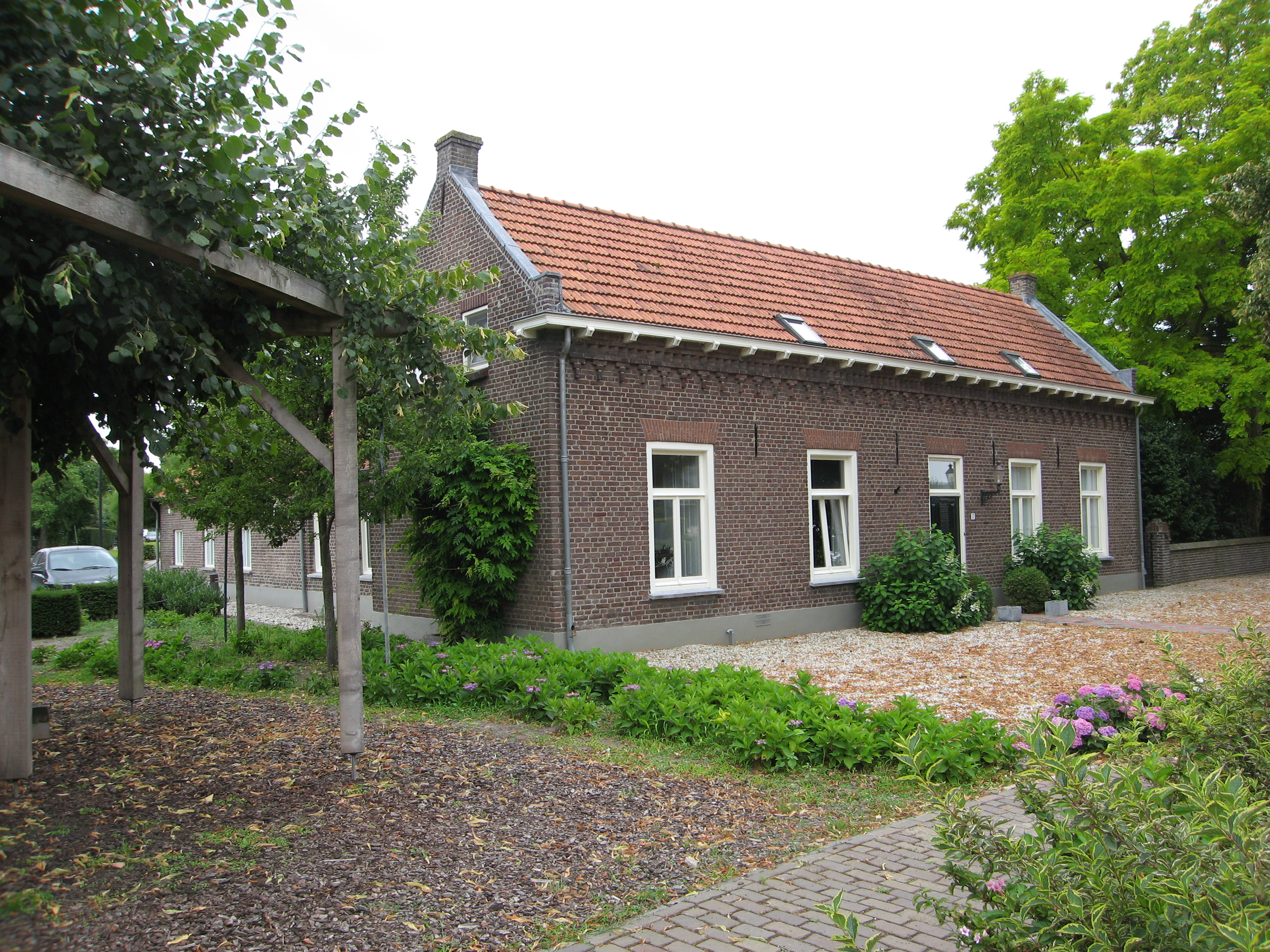
House in Groeningen
