= Heikant, Overloon =

Dutch hamlet

Coordinates: 51°35′3″N 5°57′15″E

Heikant is a hamlet in the former municipality of Boxmeer, in the Dutch province of North Brabant. It is located about 2 km north of Overloon. Since 2022 it has been part of the new municipality of Land van Cuijk.
