= Maashees en Overloon =

Coordinates: 51°34′20″N 5°58′58″E

Coat of Arms

Maashees en Overloon was a municipality in the Dutch province of North Brabant. It included the villages of Maashees and Overloon.

Maashees en Overloon existed until 1942, when it was merged into Vierlingsbeek.

Since 2022 it has been part of the new municipality of Land van Cuijk.
