= Boxmeer =

- Town and former municipality
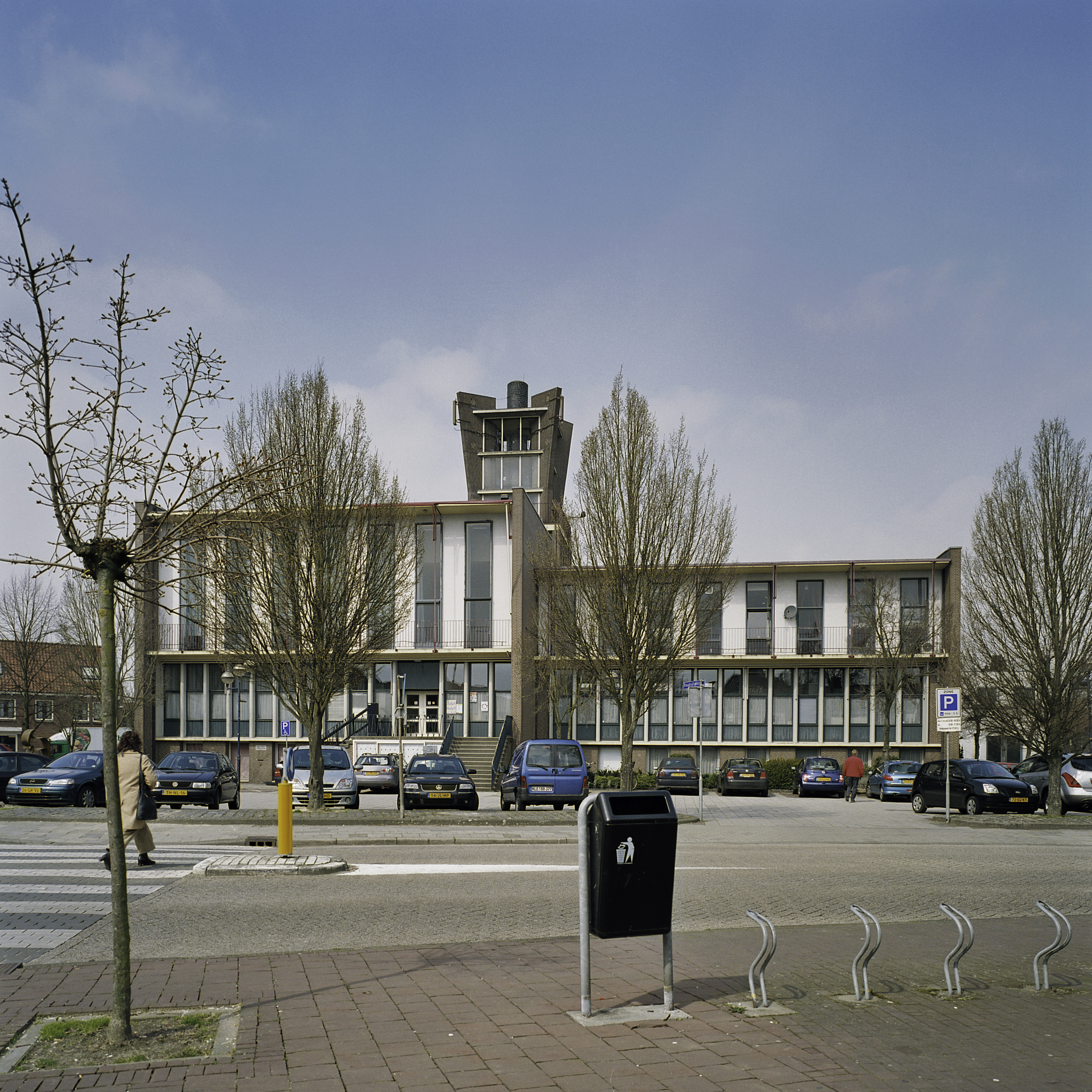
- Former Boxmeer city hall (until 2010)

- Flag Coat of arms

- Location of the former municipality of Boxmeer in North Brabant

- Location in the province of North Brabant in the Netherlands Boxmeer (Netherlands)
- Coordinates: 51°39′N 5°57′E
- Country: Netherlands
- Province: North Brabant
- Municipality: Land van Cuijk

Area
  - Total: 10.87 km^{2} (4.20 sq mi)
- Elevation: 13 m (43 ft)

Population (2021)
  - Total: 12,565
  - Density: 1,156/km^{2} (2,994/sq mi)
- Demonym: Boxmeerenaar
- Time zone: UTC+1 (CET)
  - Summer (DST): UTC+2 (CEST)
- Postcode: 5831
- Area code: 0485
- Website: www.boxmeer.nl

Boxmeer (Dutch pronunciation: [bɔksˈmeːr]) is a town and former municipality in upper southeastern Netherlands. Boxmeer as a municipality incorporated the former municipality of Beugen en Rijkevoort and that of Vierlingsbeek.

One of the population centers of the former municipality is Overloon, where the Overloon War Museum is located.

Boxmeer, Cuijk, Grave, Mill en Sint Hubert, and Sint Anthonis merged into the new municipality of Land van Cuijk on 1 January 2022.

== Topography ==
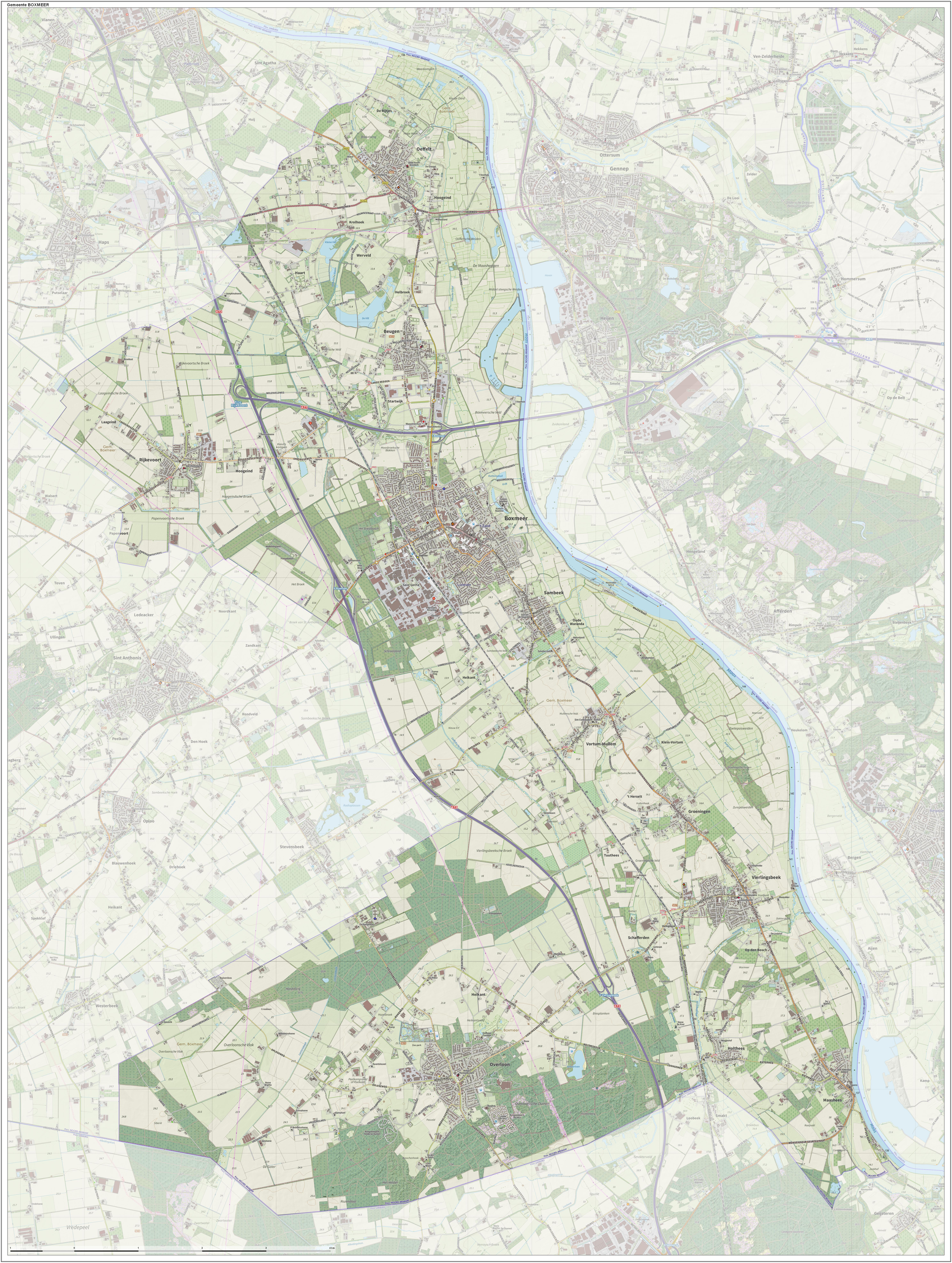
Map of the former municipality of Boxmeer, 2015

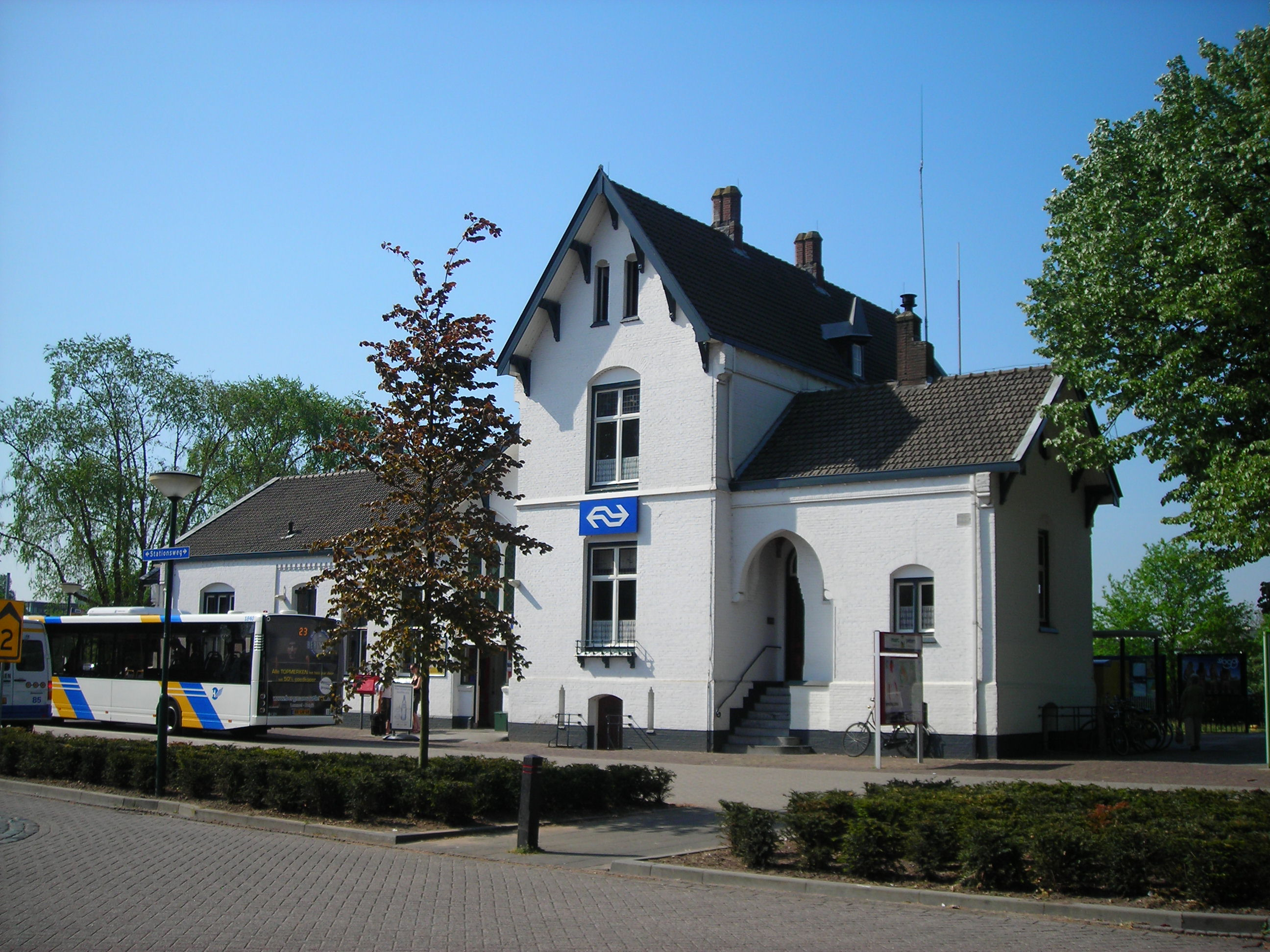
Station Boxmeer

== Population centres ==
The population in parts of the former municipality on 31 December 2020 was:

- Beugen 1,860
- Boxmeer 12,550
- Holthees 540
- Maashees 875
- Oeffelt 2,370
- Overloon, including Heikant 3,985
- Rijkevoort 1,665
- Sambeek 1,745
- Vierlingsbeek, including Groeningen 3,050
- Vortum-Mullem 705

== Transport ==
- Boxmeer railway station

== Notable people ==
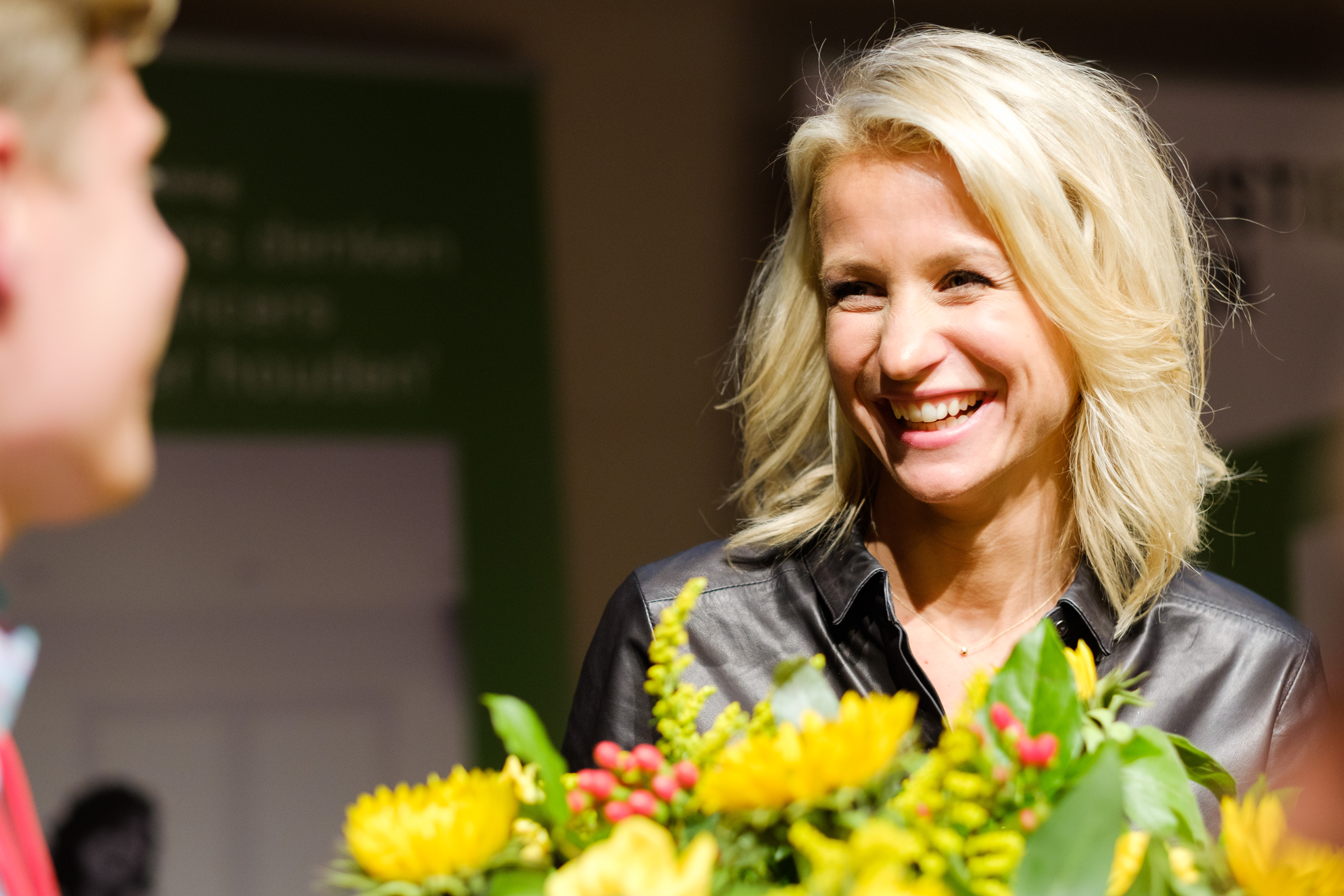
Dionne Stax, 2017

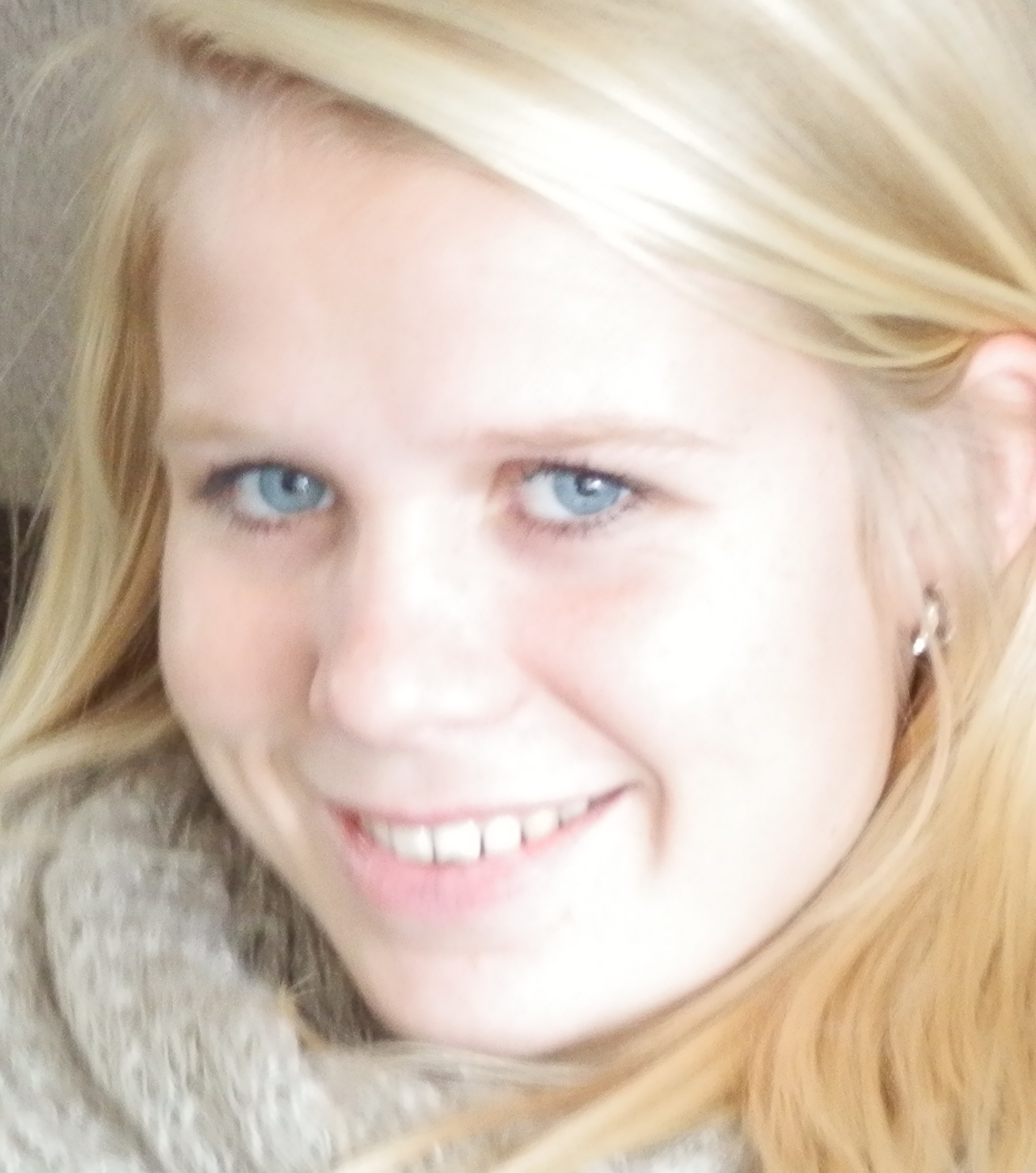
Kika van Es, 2011

- Dr Anna Terruwe (1911 in Vierlingsbeek – 2004) a Catholic psychiatrist who discovered emotional deprivation disorder
- Joannes Gijsen (1932 in Oeffelt – 2013) a Dutch bishop of the Roman Catholic Church, Bishop of Roermond and Reykjavík
- Emile Roemer (born 1962 in Boxmeer) a Dutch politician
- Hugo van der Velden (born 1963 in Boxmeer) a Dutch art historian
- Charles Deenen (born 1970 in Holthees) a Dutch computer/video game audio director, music composer, sound designer and mixer
- Dionne Stax (born 1985 in Boxmeer) a Dutch journalist and newsreader

=== Sport ===
- Sjaak Lucassen (born 1961 in Maashees) a Dutch long-distance motorcycle rider
- Niels Fleuren (born 1986 in Boxmeer) a Dutch professional footballer with 420 club caps
- Sander de Wijn (born 1990 in Boxmeer) a Dutch field hockey player, silver medallist at the 2012 Summer Olympics
- Kika van Es (born 1991 in Boxmeer) a Dutch football defender

== Gallery ==
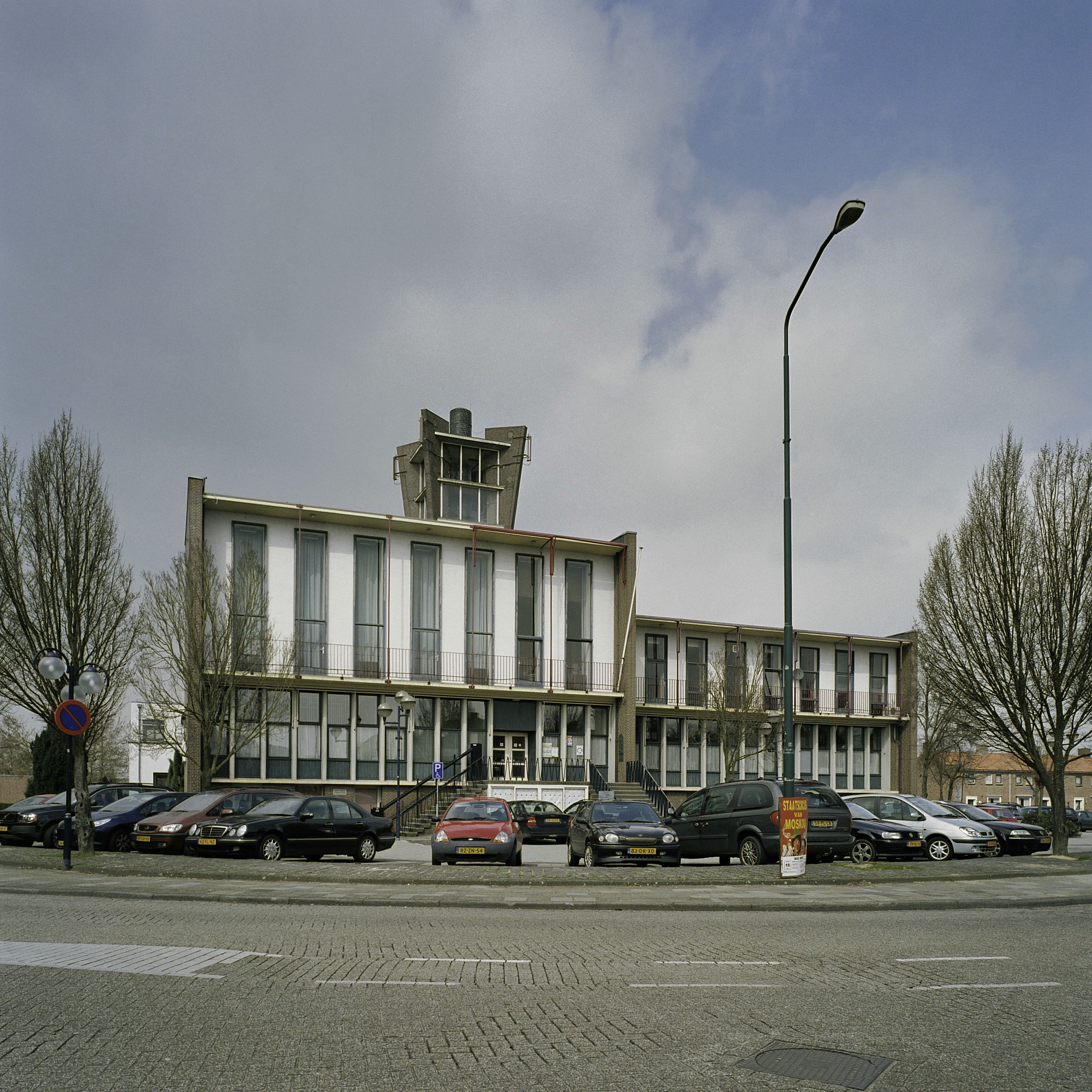
Boxmeer, former townhall

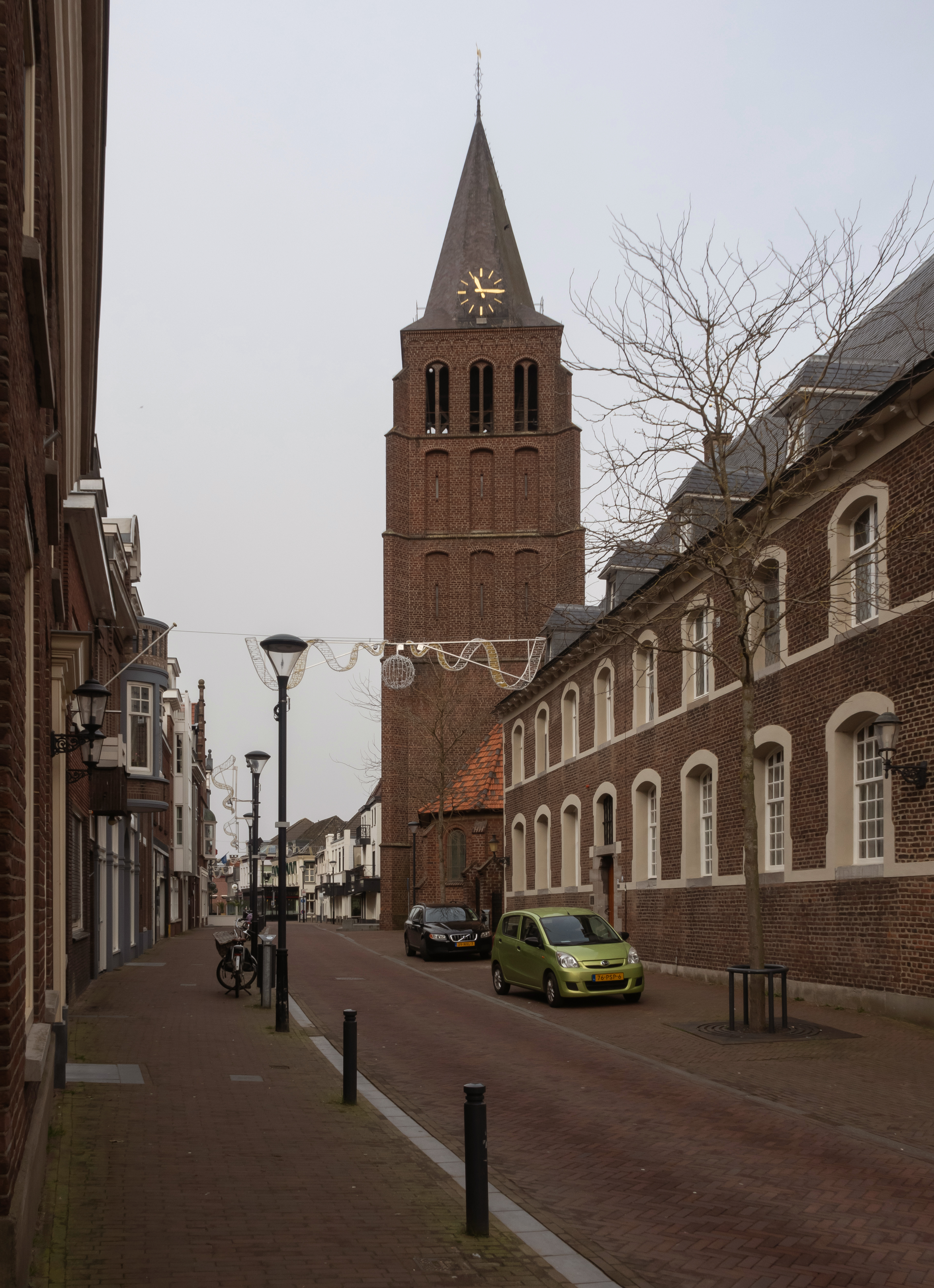
Boxmeer, basilica: the Sint-Petrusbasiliek

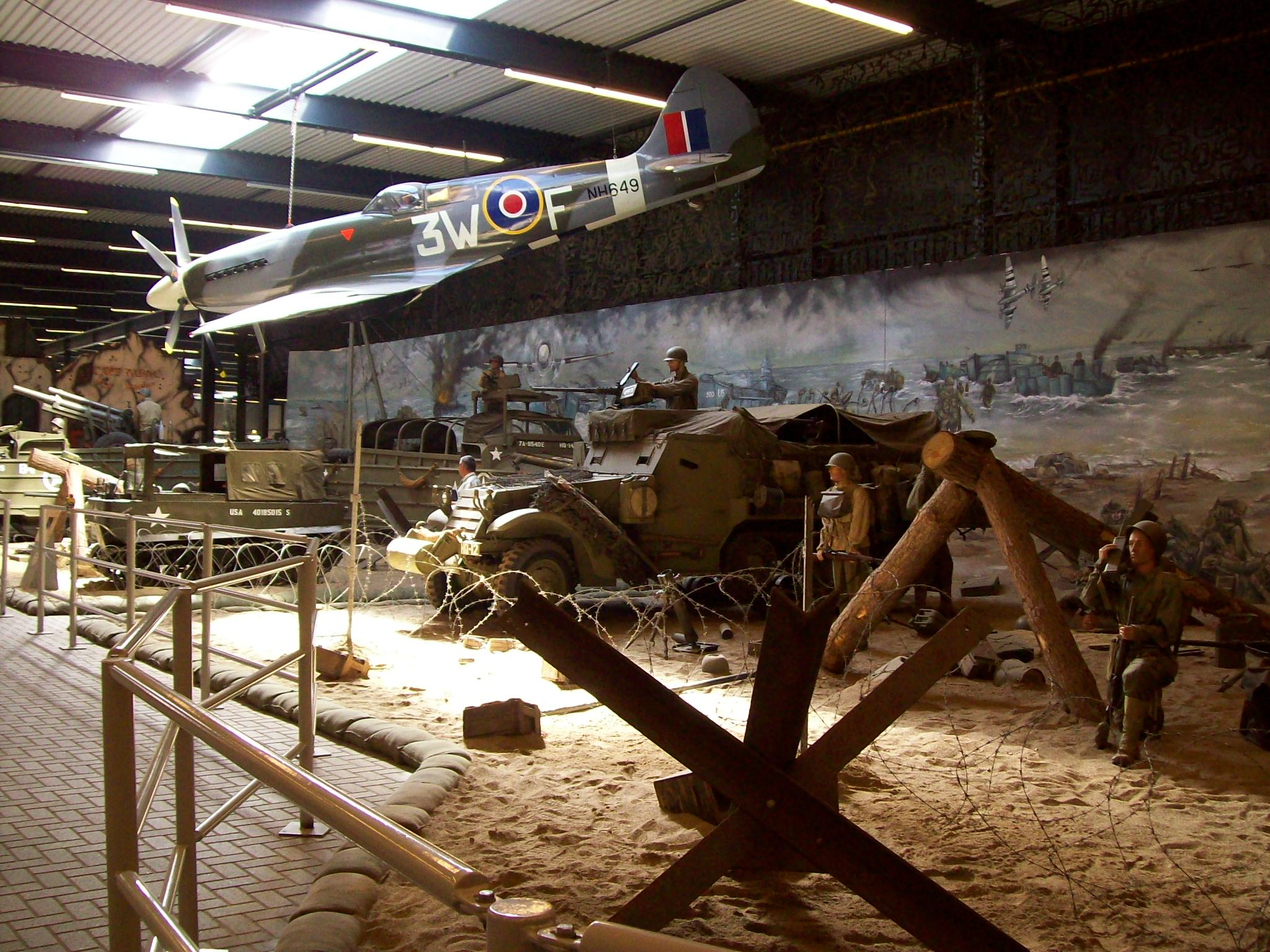
Overloon War Museum

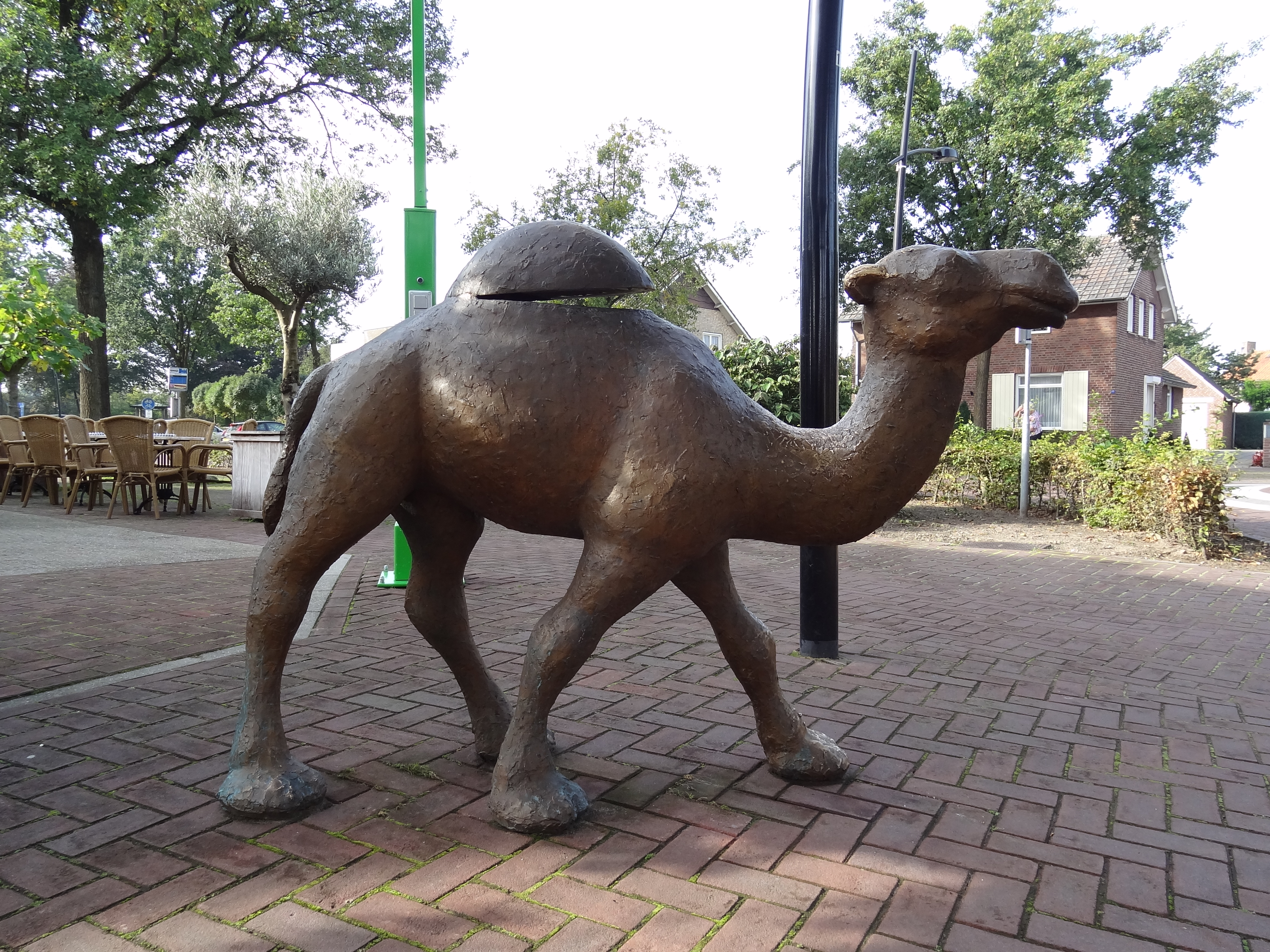
Overloon, sculpture

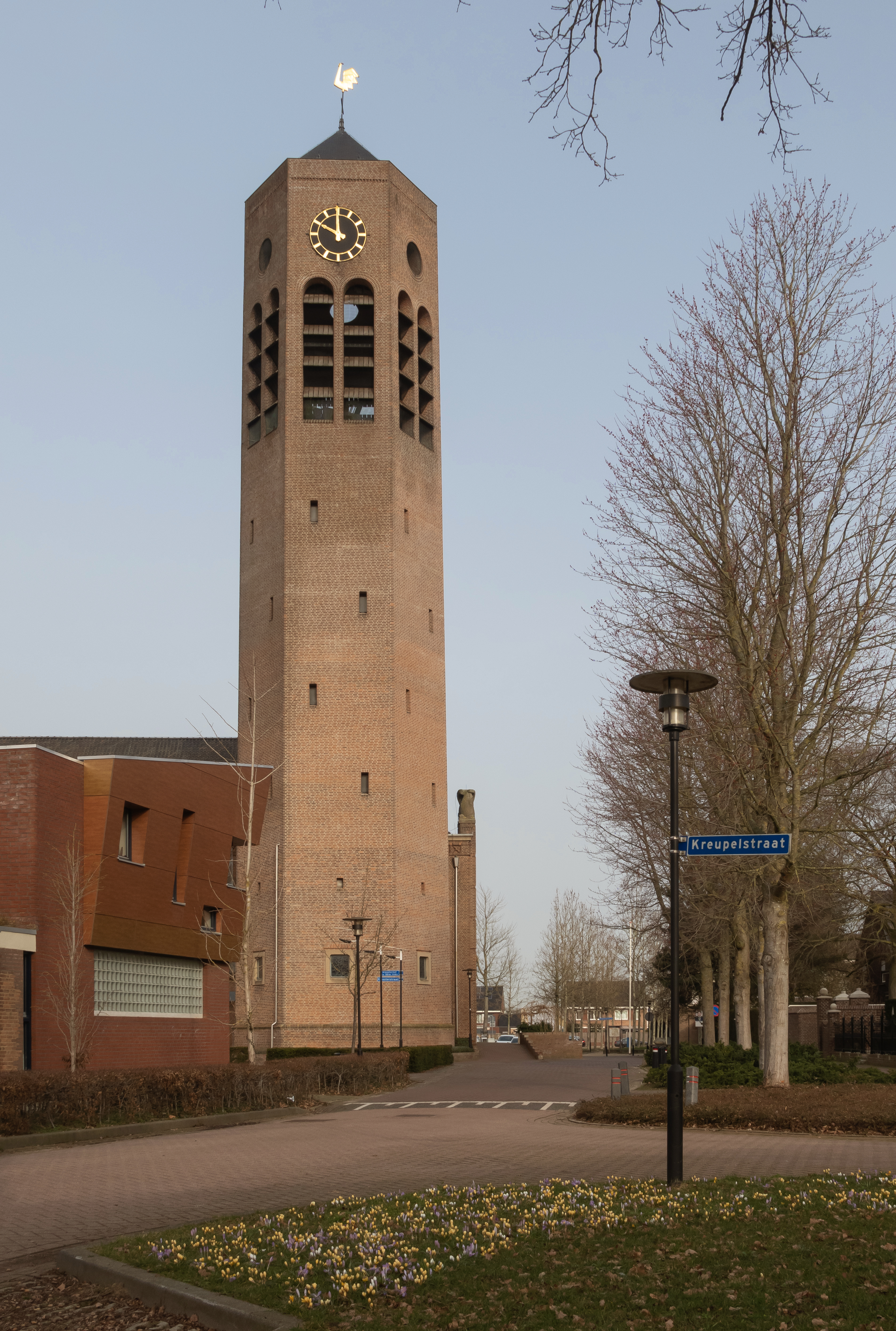
Vierlingsbeek, church: Sint Laurentiuskerk

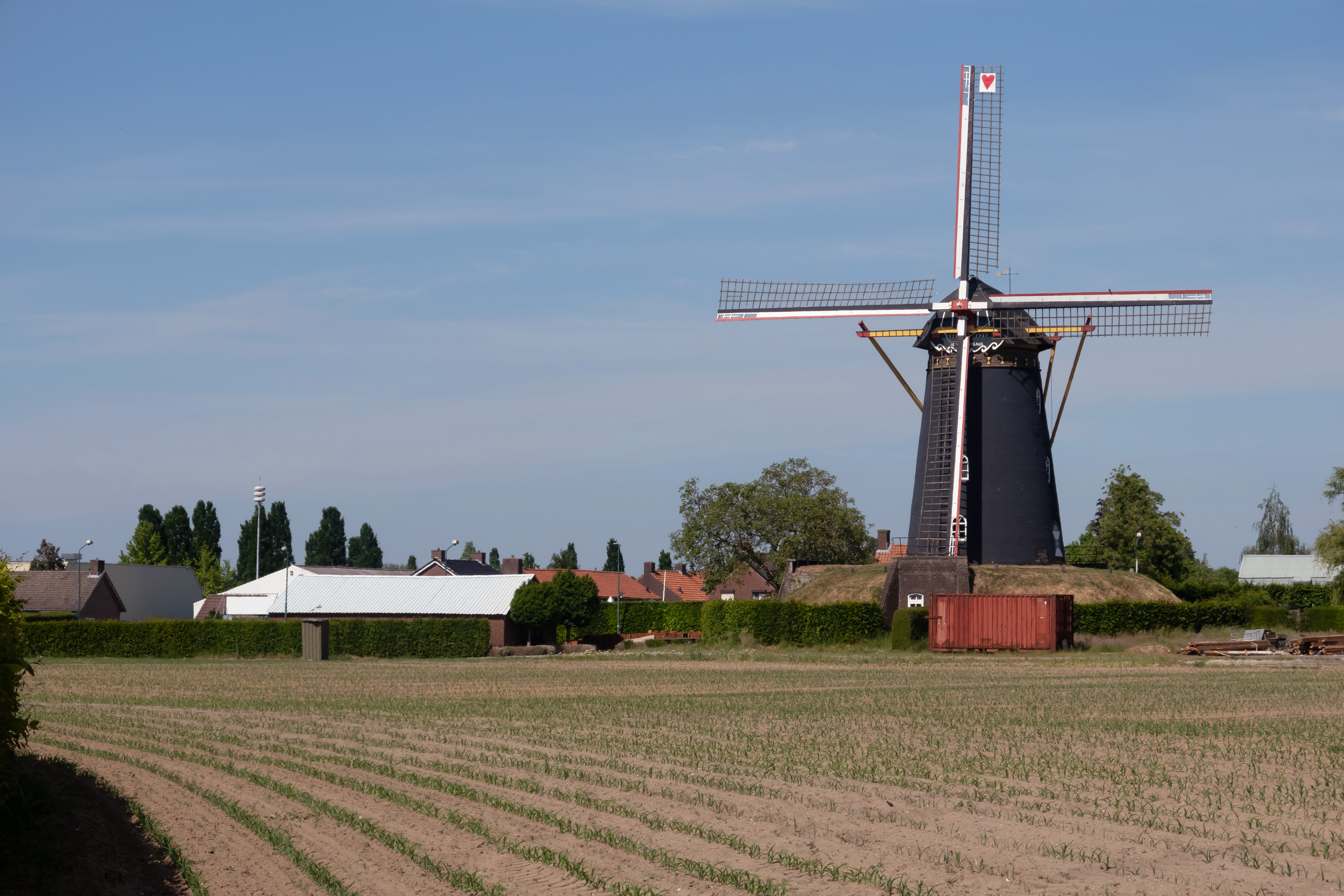
Oeffelt, windmill: molen de Vooruitgang
