= Overloon =

- Village
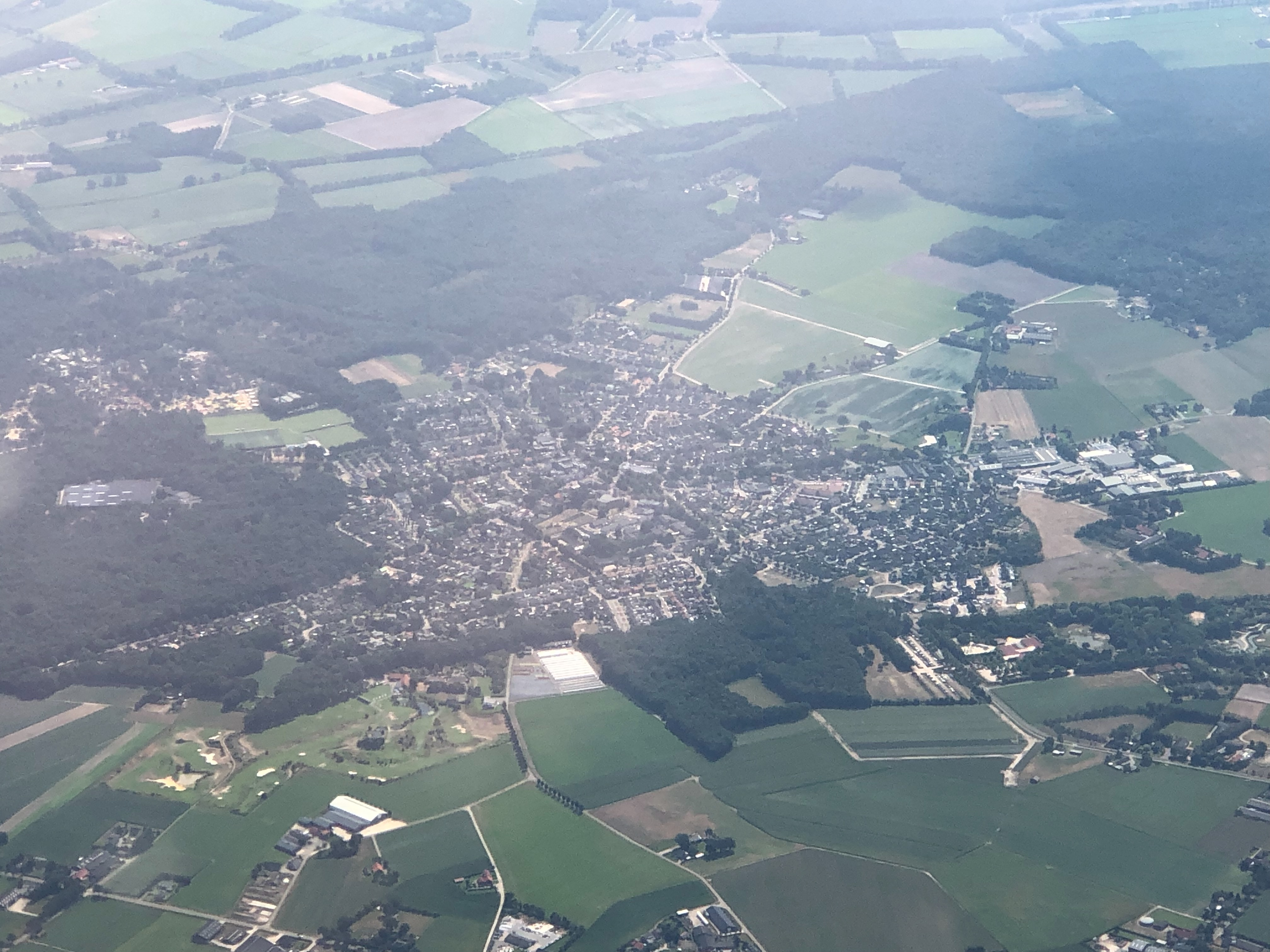
- Aerial view of Overloon

- Coat of arms

- Location in the province of North Brabant in the Netherlands Overloon (Netherlands)
- Coordinates: 51°34′N 5°57′E
- Country: Netherlands
- Province: North Brabant
- Municipality: Land van Cuijk

Area
  - Total: 21.34 km^{2} (8.24 sq mi)
- Elevation: 24 m (79 ft)

Population (2021)
  - Total: 3,710
  - Density: 174/km^{2} (450/sq mi)
- Time zone: UTC+1 (CET)
  - Summer (DST): UTC+2 (CEST)
- Postal code: 5825
- Dialing code: 0478

Overloon is a village with 3,626 inhabitants on the outskirts of the Peel region, in the former municipality of Boxmeer, North Brabant. Since 2022 it has been part of the new municipality of Land van Cuijk.

Located on the outskirts is the National Museum of War and Resistance of the Netherlands, which originated as a museum for a World War II battle (Battle of Overloon) that occurred around the village from 30 September to 18 October 1944. The village is located close to the A73 motorway between Venlo and Nijmegen.

== Toponymy ==
In ancient times it was simply called Loon. Loon or Lo(o) means forest with low trees, with an open meadow and swamp. The element "over" was added to the name much later, to distinguish it from the nearby Loon Ravenstein, Neerloon. "Neder" and "over" here means, respectively, lower and higher, or downstream and upstream.

== History ==
Since the formation of the Kingdom of the Netherlands, the village was part of the Maashees en Overloon municipality with the nearby hamlet of Maashees. In 1942 this municipality was added to the municipality of Vierlingsbeek and in 1998 they were all included within Boxmeer. Around 1900 the village was widely spread across moorlands and poorly connected to larger towns such as Venray, Vierlingsbeek, Sambeek, Oploo en Sint Anthonis. There were about 600 people in 110 houses.

The oldest written mention of Loon is a grant of charter from Jan van Cuijk from the year 1308. Jan van Cuijk in this deed, that he recorded at St. Lawrence Church in Vierlingsbeek, gives the right to waive the (low) tax in(Over)Loon.

=== Administrative and legal until 1795 ===
The Loon village government consisted of three aldermen, four jurors and one or two bankers. The latter were especially responsible for the finances. From the fourteenth century, the aldermen had jurisdiction together with that of an alderman of the Vierlingsbeek bank. Vierlingsbeek was the head of the four aldermen. Criminal cases had to go to the bench in Grave. This joint arrangement of aldermen was maintained until 1803. From that year, Overloon had the power to regulate the judiciary itself. This lasted only seven years, due to the unstable political situation.

Between 1794 (after the French invasion) and 1810 the territory of the Netherlands, and hence that of Overloon, was first made part of the Republic of France (1794-1795), and then successively of the Kingdom of The Netherlands (1795 - 1796), the Batavian Republic (1796-1805), the Batavian Commonwealth (1805-1806) and the Kingdom of Holland (1806-1810).

=== Administration after 1810 ===
In 1810 the entire Dutch territory was annexed by France and became a part of the Empire of France (1810-1814). As a result, there was new legislation and a different organization of public administration and law in the Netherlands. At local level, municipalities were formed, under the direction of a mayor. The village authorities were abolished from that moment. Overloon and Maashees merged into one municipality, of which Holthees was also a part. This had the name, Maashees and Overloon. This was, in 1942, in the municipality Vierlingsbeek, which in turn, on 1 January 1998, merged with Boxmeer.

=== World War II ===
In 1944, Overloon was almost completely destroyed at the Battle of Overloon, officially also known as Operation Aintree, in a ten-day tank battle between a British tank division and the German army. The Germans were trying to keep the Allies from crossing the Maas. There were more than two thousand dead. Overloon was liberated on 14 October 1944, but the fighting lasted for some days longer. This is the reason for the establishment of the War Museum, which later became known as the National War and Resistance Museum and then Liberty Park.

== Places of interest ==
- The Liberty Park, including the National War and Resistance Museum, opened in 1946.
- The Zoo Parc Overloon, a small zoo.
- On the path between the Liberty Park and the zoo are seven wooden sculptures produced by Marjolijn Mandersloot. They date from 2005.
- The Church of the Holy Theobaldus and Anthony of Padua is a modern church, designed by Jan Strik, with brick reliefs on the exterior walls. The parish has worshipped St. Donatus from 1884 to about 1970. There was a St. Donatus Brotherhood, but when in 1944 the statue was destroyed, this devotional worship gradually less. In 1975 the fraternity disbanded. At the back of the church is still a picture of St. Donatus.
- Schaartven is a former sand excavation site of 7 hectares. After the excavation site was closed, the total area of 23 hectares was planted and decorated by the municipality of Vierlingsbeek to which Overloon belonged to at that time. In 1995 the land was privatized. Nowadays there is a recreational lake with a beach and a fish pond.
- Hiding Chapel or Chapel of the Good Dive (Mary or Save Hide), from 1954. The chapel stands on the corner Venrayseweg / Mers Loseweg. The funds for this chapel are raised by the many hiding in Overloon during the war. The chapel is the following scripture (Isaiah 16: 3-4) Hide the refugees and betrayal them not and be for them a refuge from the destroyer.
- Overloon War Cemetery, a British war cemetery.
- Between Overloon, Maashees and Venray are the Overloon Dunes, a drift sand ridge.

In 2000 the town was given a new tourist attraction, the Zoo Parc Overloon.

== Sports ==
Overloon has an amateur football club named SSS'18. The club has a fierce rivalry with nearby Vierlingsbeek's club Volharding.

== Gallery ==
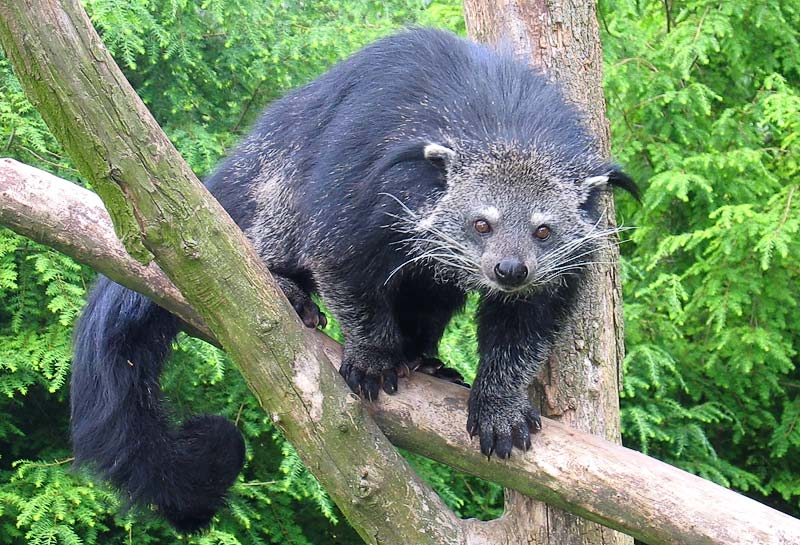
Bearcat at the Zoo Parc Overloon

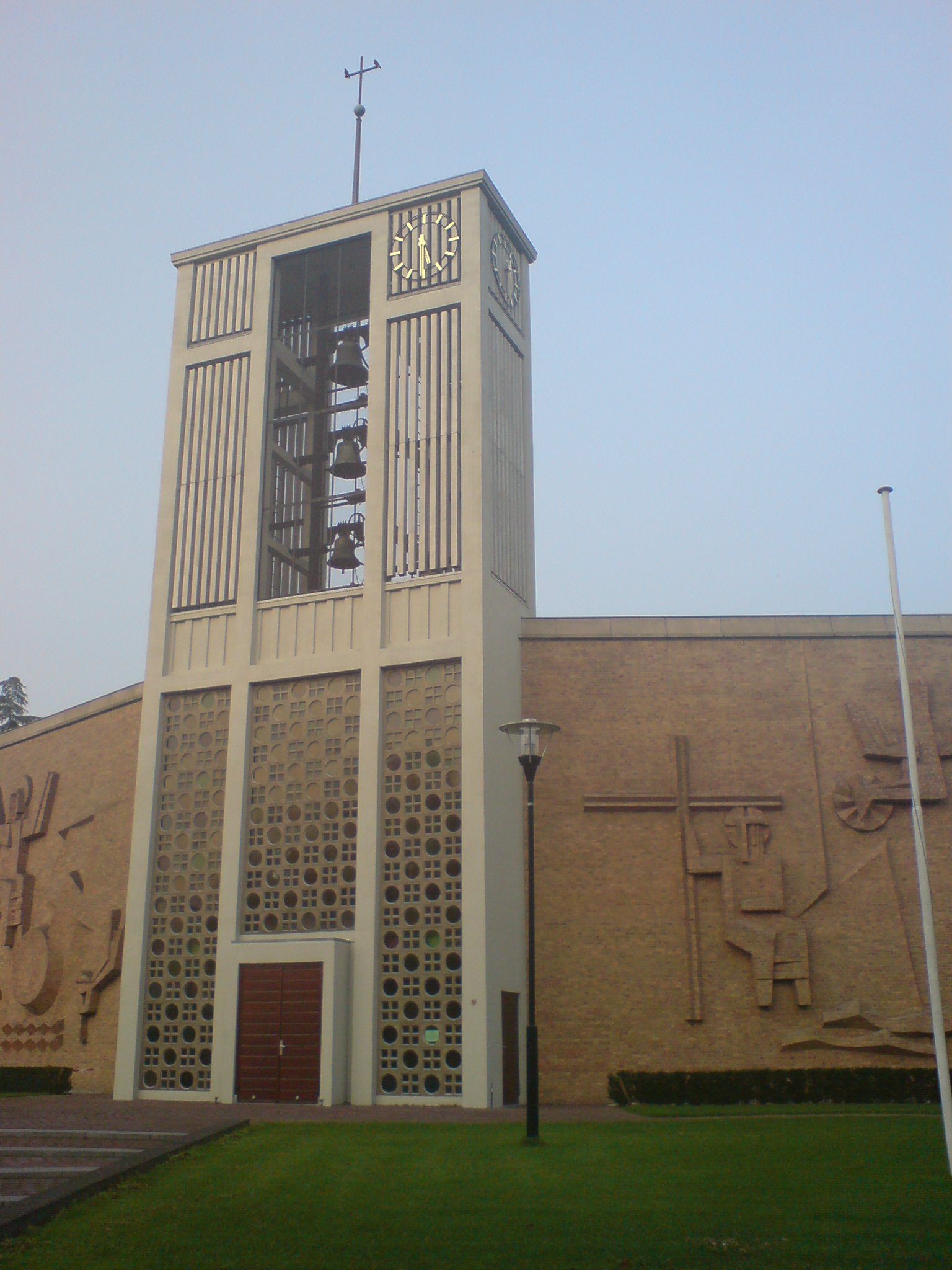
Theobaldus church Overloon

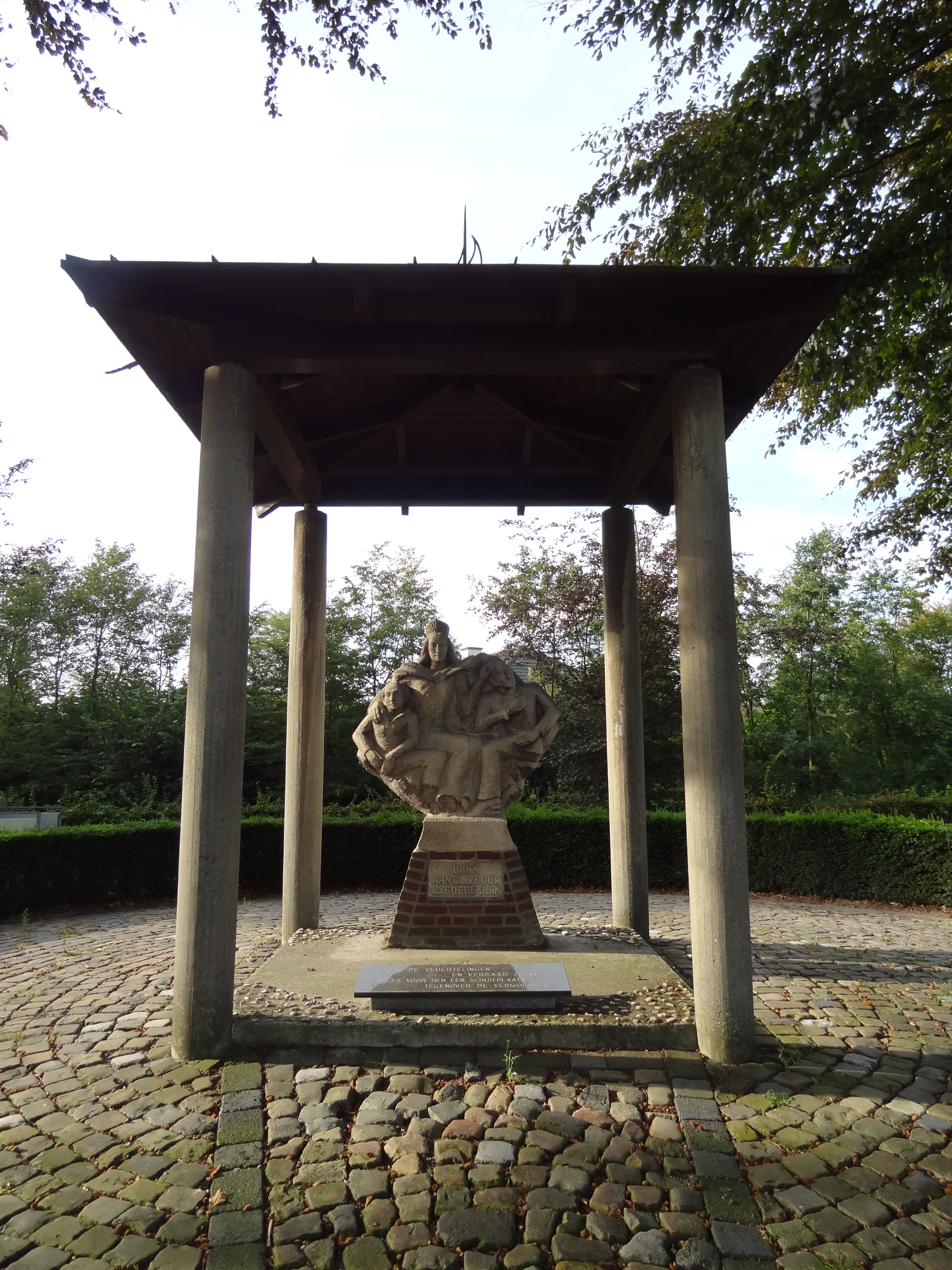
Overloon - Onderduikerskapel on Venraijseweg, represents the Church hiding refugees

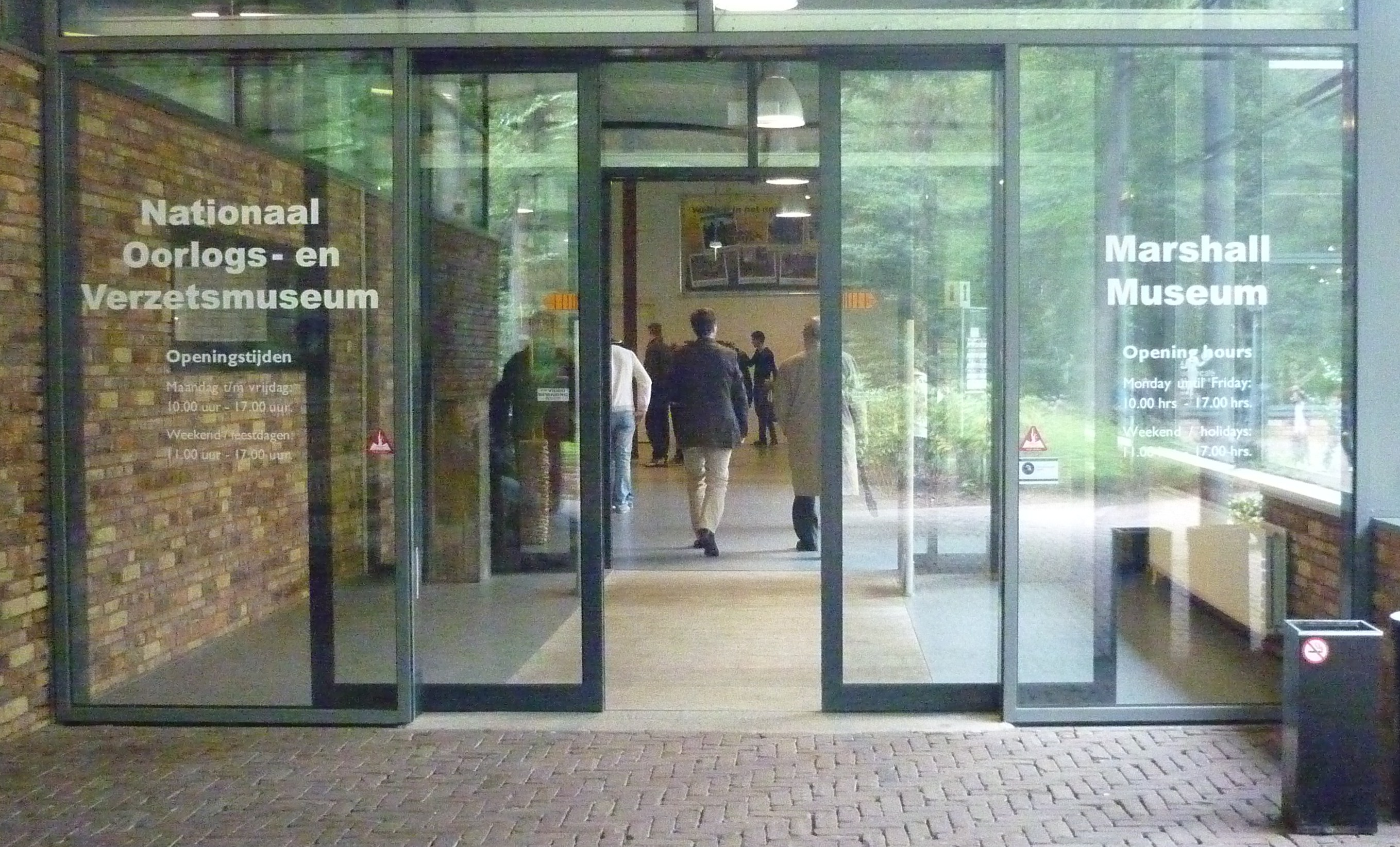
Oorlogsmuseum Overloon (Overloon War Museum)

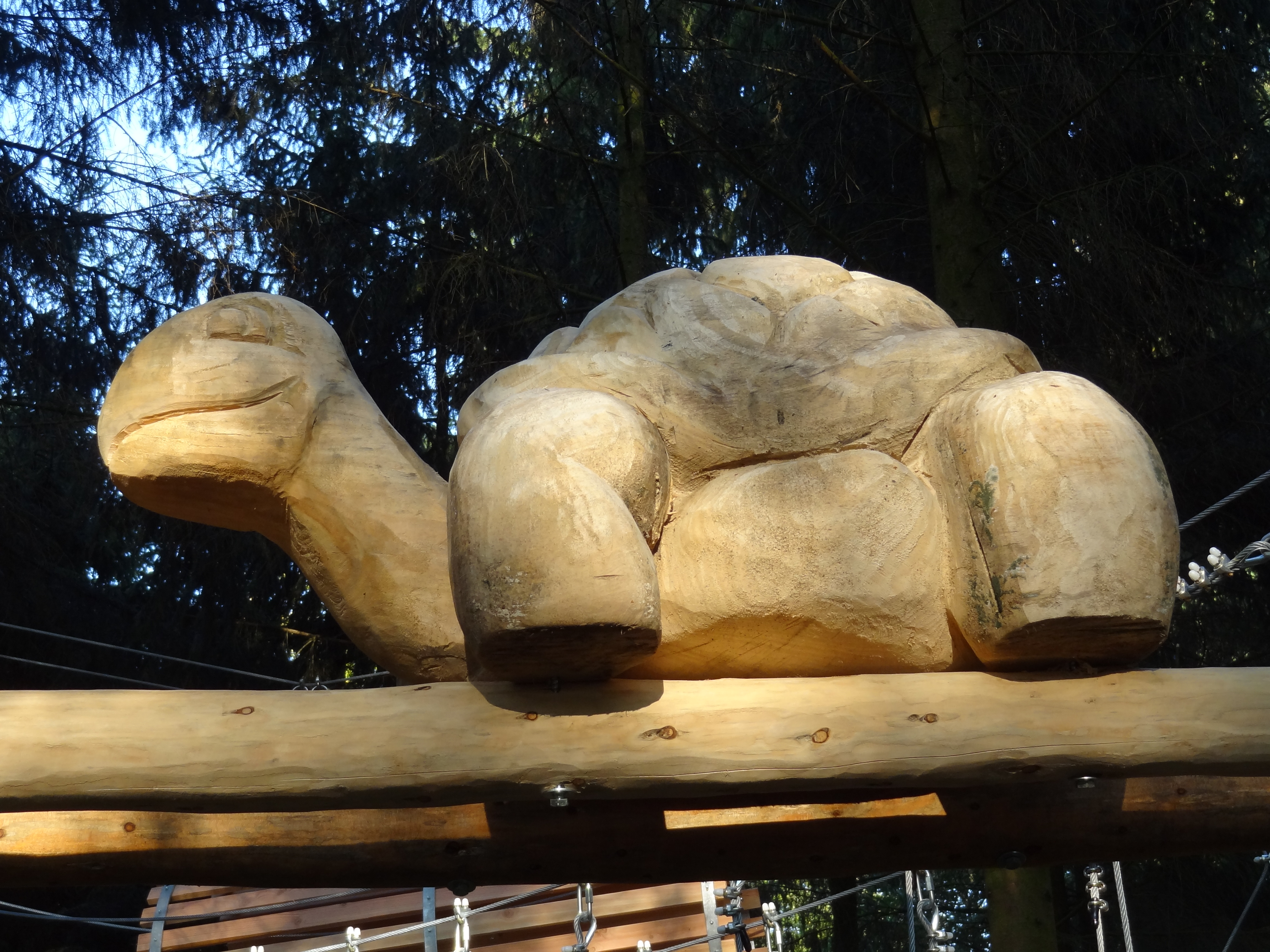
Overloon - Wooden sculpture at Liberty Park
