= Charles Deenen =

Dutch composer

- Born: 15 January 1970 (age 56); Holthees, Netherlands
- Genres: Video game music
- Occupations: Video game composer Sound designer
- Years active: 1987-present

Charles Deenen (born 15 January 1970 in Holthees), is a Dutch video game audio director, composer, sound designer, and mixer. He wrote music created sound effects for many Commodore 64 and Amiga games, in addition to working for Interplay, Electronic Arts, and other video game developers.

== Video games ==
In 1987, Deenen, Jeroen Tel, and others started the sound and music group Maniacs of Noise and composed game music for the Commodore 64, Amiga, and Atari ST, being hired by Sega, U.S. Gold, and Probe Software. Initially he was a programmer for the group, while Tel was the composer, but after their first few games he began working on music as well. He composed music for the home computer versions of Double Dragon, Soldier of Light, and Jukka Tapanimäki's game Zamzara. Maniacs of Noise composed the music for over 300 Commodore 64 and Amiga games.

In 1990, he moved to the US and worked for Virgin Games for six months. In 1991, Interplay hired him where was a composer and sound designer on Fallout 1 and Fallout 2, Another World, Planescape: Torment, The Lost Vikings, and Descent 2. In 2002 he left Interplay and briefly worked for Shiny on Enter the Matrix. In 2003, Deenen joined EA Canada as senior audio director for the Need for Speed series. In 2013 he left to work as a freelancer.

== Other work ==
Deenen also works on sound for films. He provides world-wide lectures about sound in video games, films and trailers as of 2006. He is also a professional photographer, having many collections of works on his own site.
