= Battle of Overloon =

1944 battle of WW2 in the Netherlands

- Part of World War II
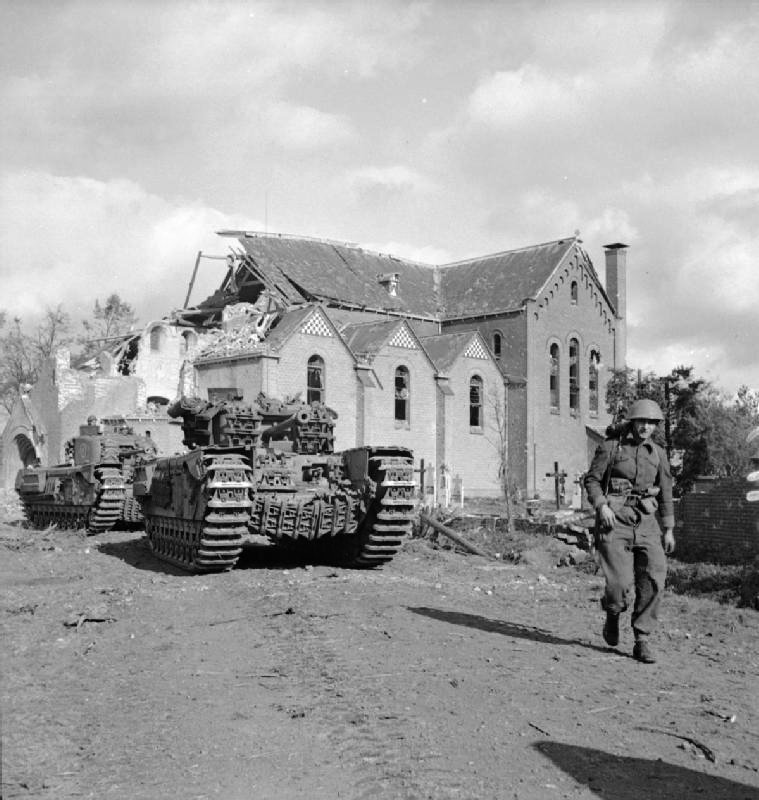
- Churchill tanks with infantry advance during the attack by 3rd Division on a German pocket near Overloon, 14 October 1944.
Date	30 September – 18 October 1944
Location	Overloon, Netherlands 51°34′13″N 5°57′30″E
Result	Allied victory

Belligerents
United Kingdom; United States	Germany

Commanders and leaders
(United Kingdom) Lashmer Whistler (United States) Lindsay Sylvester	(Nazi Germany) Kurt Student

Strength
2 divisions	107th Panzer Brigade, Fallschirmjäger units

Casualties and losses
1,878 men 3 aircraft 40 tanks	600 infantry tanks

The Battle of Overloon was fought in the Second World War between Allied forces and the German Army which took place in and around the village of Overloon in the south-east of the Netherlands between 30 September and 18 October 1944. The battle was an Allied victory, after the Allies launched Operation Aintree. The Allies went on to liberate the town of Venray.

== Background ==
=== Operation Market Garden ===
In September 1944, the Allies had conducted Operation Market Garden, an offensive from the Dutch–Belgian border across the south of the Netherlands through Eindhoven and Nijmegen toward the Rhine bridge at Arnhem, with the goal of crossing the Rhine and bypassing the Siegfried Line in preparation for the final drive toward Berlin. Allied airborne troops were defeated at the Rhine bridge in Arnhem and the advance stopped south of the Nederrijn (Lower Rhine), resulting in a narrow salient that ran from the north of Belgium across the south-east of the Netherlands.

German forces attacked the salient from a bridgehead west of the bend in the river Meuse (Maas to the Dutch and the Germans) near the city of Venlo. The bridgehead was established by retreating German forces who were reinforced with troops arriving from nearby Germany by crossing the Meuse in Venlo. The western edge of this bridgehead ran through the Peel, a region with bogs and several canals blocking an Allied advance. The Allies decided to attack the bridgehead from the north and this meant they had to capture Overloon and Venray, which were on the road toward Venlo.

=== Operation Aintree ===
The operation had the goal of securing the narrow salient the Allies had established between Eindhoven and Nijmegen during Operation Market Garden and destroying the German bridgehead west of the Meuse, in preparation for the eventual Allied advance into the nearby German Rhineland.

== Battle ==
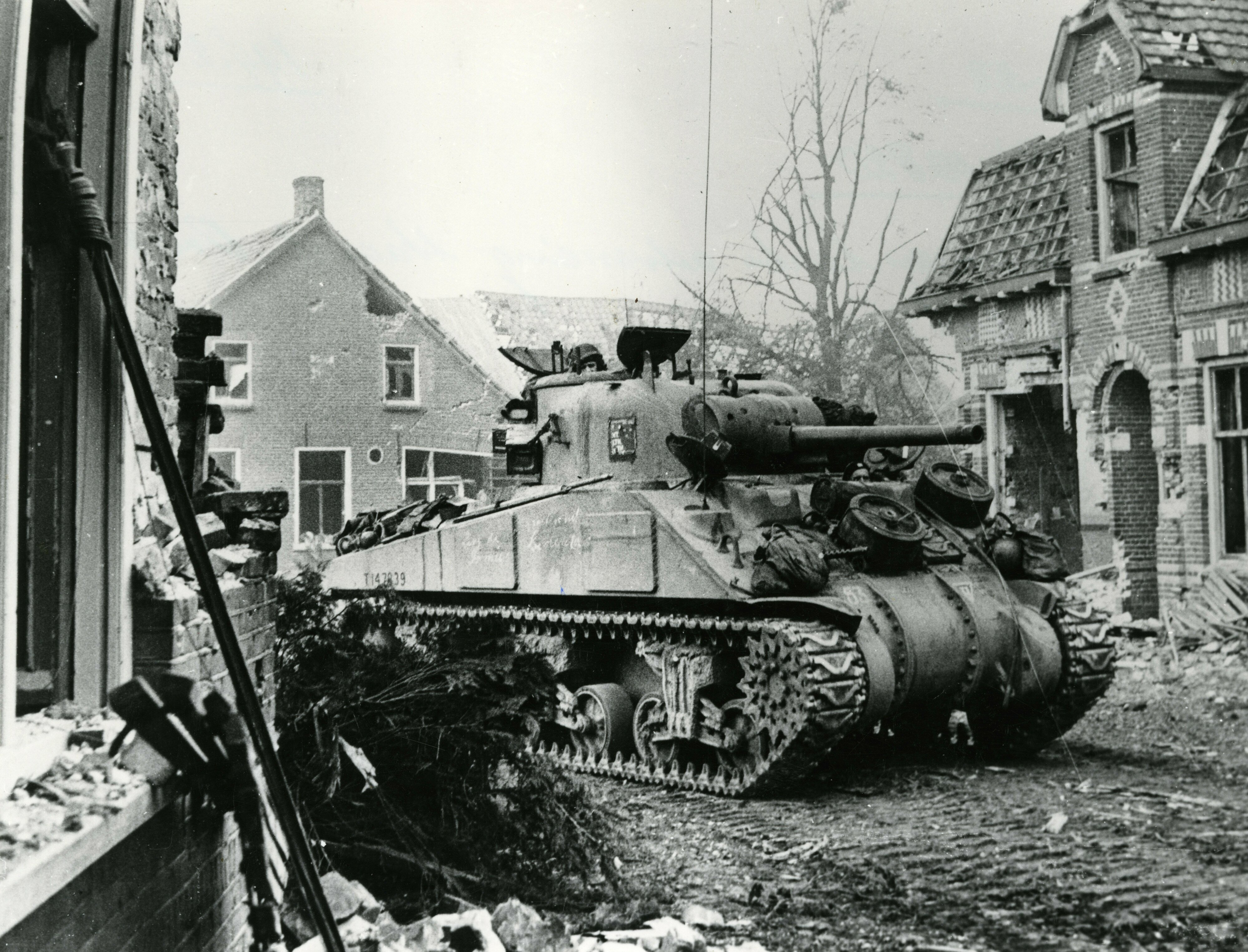
An Allied Sherman tank on the streets of Overloon, 17 October.

During Operation Aintree, the battle of Overloon took place, as the Allies advanced from nearby positions south toward the village of Overloon. The American plan was to have the 7th Armored Division and the 29th Infantry Division advance southwards in the eastern Netherlands, between the Peel marshes and the Maas River bordering Germany, to clear out German resistance. As the 7th Armored Division moved north from France, the plan was changed -- based on faulty British intelligence and American General Courtney Hodges' over-optimism -- to deploy the infantry division elsewhere and leave the effort to the 7th Armored Division.

After the attack on Overloon by the 7th Armored Division stalled, the British 3rd Infantry Division and the British 11th Armoured Division took over. The 7th Armored Division was moved south of Overloon to the Deurne–Weert area. Here they were attached to the British Second Army, and ordered to make demonstration attacks to the east to divert enemy forces from the Overloon and Venlo areas.

The British captured Overloon in a costly attack and moved on towards Venray. The advance on Venray resulted in more casualties, especially around the Loobeek creek, which was swollen due to the autumn rains and was flooded and mined by the Germans. Casualties were severe among the 1st Battalion, Royal Norfolk Regiment which was serving in 185th Infantry Brigade of the 3rd Infantry Division. During the battle, the village of Overloon was destroyed. In and around Overloon about 2,500 soldiers were killed, making it one of the bloodiest battles in the Netherlands during the Second World War. Dozens of tanks, mainly American, were destroyed.

== Aftermath ==
Despite the fact that Overloon and Venray were taken by the Allies, the advance toward the bend of the Meuse near Venlo was postponed. This was due to the number of casualties the Allies had suffered and because troops were needed to support the Battle of the Scheldt to occupy the Scheldt estuary, leading to the port of Antwerp. Operation Pheasant was conducted on 20 October to expand the Market Garden salient westwards to the province of North Brabant. Following a failed counter attack in the Peel Marshes, the German bridgehead west of the Meuse was destroyed. Blerick (near Venlo) was liberated in the first days of December 1944, Venlo and other districts east of the Meuse were liberated on 1 March 1945 (during Operation Grenade). Some days before, Wehrmacht units had left the Maas-Rur-Stellung between Wassenberg (at the river Rur) and Venlo (at the river Meuse).

== Remembrance ==
The battle of Overloon has become known as the second battle of Caen due to its ferocity and also as the forgotten battle, because like the other engagements in the Peel area it is not well known in much of the Netherlands. The tanks and other armoured vehicles which were left on the battlefield have been preserved and in Overloon a museum, which opened in 1946, was erected to commemorate the battle. Today, two museums occupy the original museum grounds, which have been renamed Liberty Park. The National War and Resistance Museum of the Netherlands focuses on the Dutch experience of war and German occupation between 1940 and 1945. The Marshall Museum holds a collection of armoured vehicles, weaponry and aircraft from the Second World War, much of it left on the Overloon battlefield and focuses on the battle of Overloon and other military aspects of the Second World War. Two memorials have been erected on the battle site. On the banks of the Loobeek creek, where it is crossed by the road between Overloon and Venray, stands the Norfolk monument, dedicated to the 1st Battalion of the Royal Norfolk Regiment. The liberation of Venray is one of their battle honours. There is also another memorial in the museum grounds of Liberty Park.

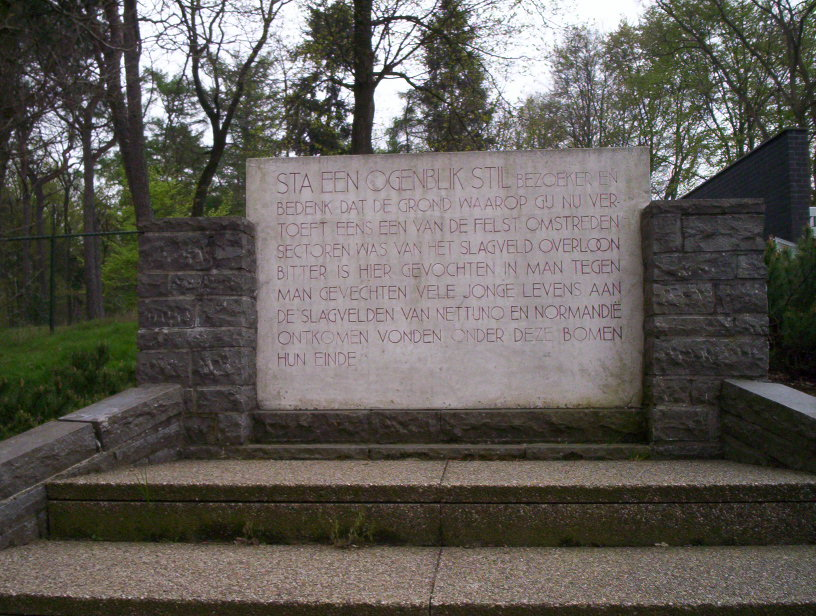
Memorial to the battle in Overloon

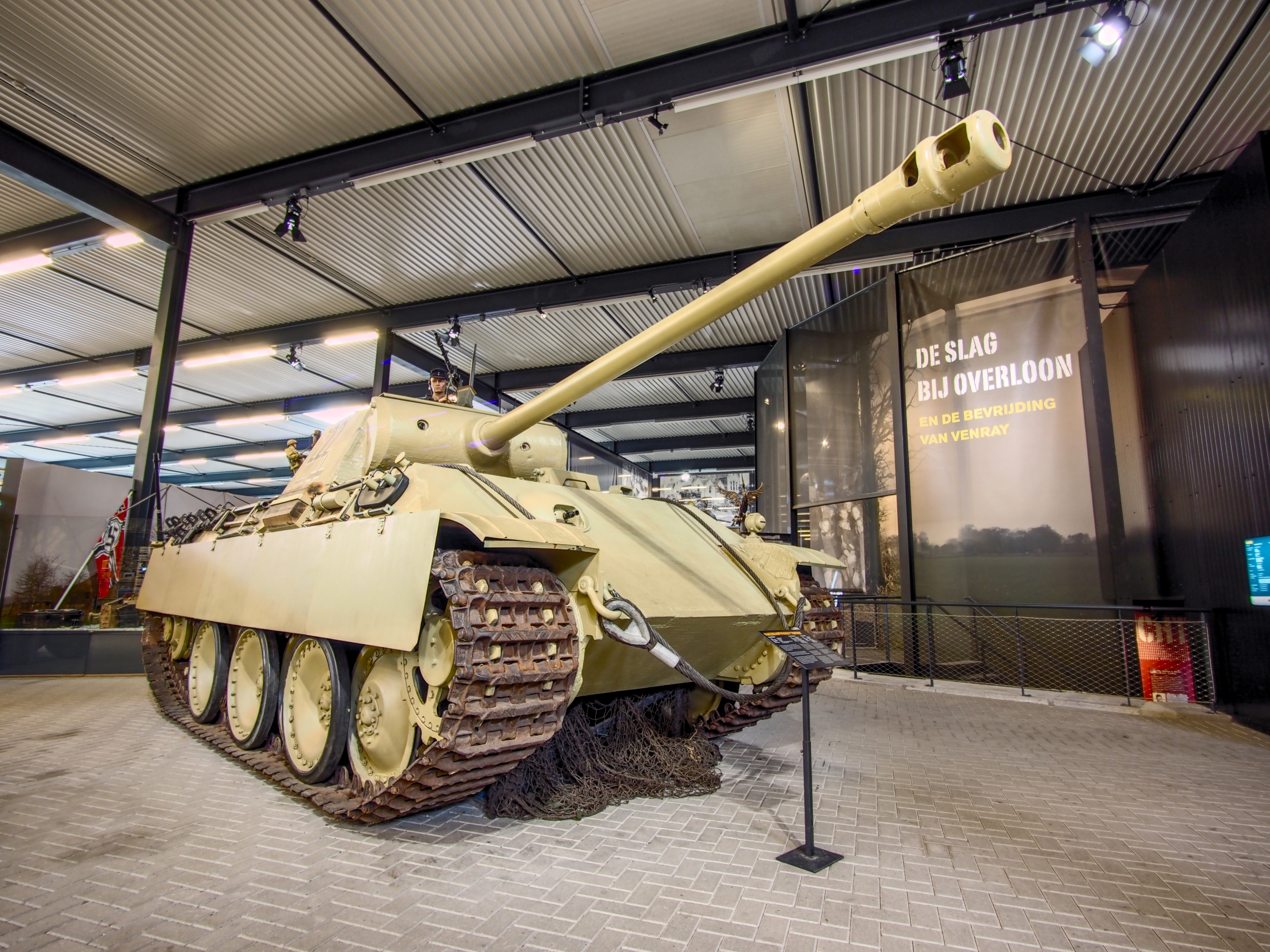
Panther tank at the Overloon War Museum, which was knocked out by the 2nd Battalion, East Yorkshire Regiment during the battle

The text of the memorial:
Dutch: STA EEN OGENBLIK STIL bezoeker en bedenk dat de grond waarop gij nu vertoeft eens een van de felst omstreden sectoren was van het slagveld Overloon. Bitter is hier gevochten in man tegen man gevechten. Vele jonge levens ontkomen aan de slagvelden van Nettuno en Normandië vonden onder deze bomen hun einde.

English translation: "TAKE PAUSE FOR A MOMENT visitor, and consider that the ground you are now on was once one of the most fiercely contested sectors of the Overloon battlefield. Bitter hand-to-hand combat ensued here. Many young lives, having escaped from the battlefields of Nettuno and Normandy, met their ends under these trees."

== See also ==
- Overloon War Museum
- Kenneth Mayhew

== Bibliography ==
- MacDonald, Charles B. (1993) [1963]. The Siegfried Line Campaign (PDF). United States Army in World War II: The European Theater of Operations. Washington D.C.: United States Army. LCCN 62-60001 – via U.S. Army Center of Military History.
