= Overloon War Museum =

Military Museum in Overloon, The Netherlands

Coordinates: 51°34′14″N 5°57′25″E

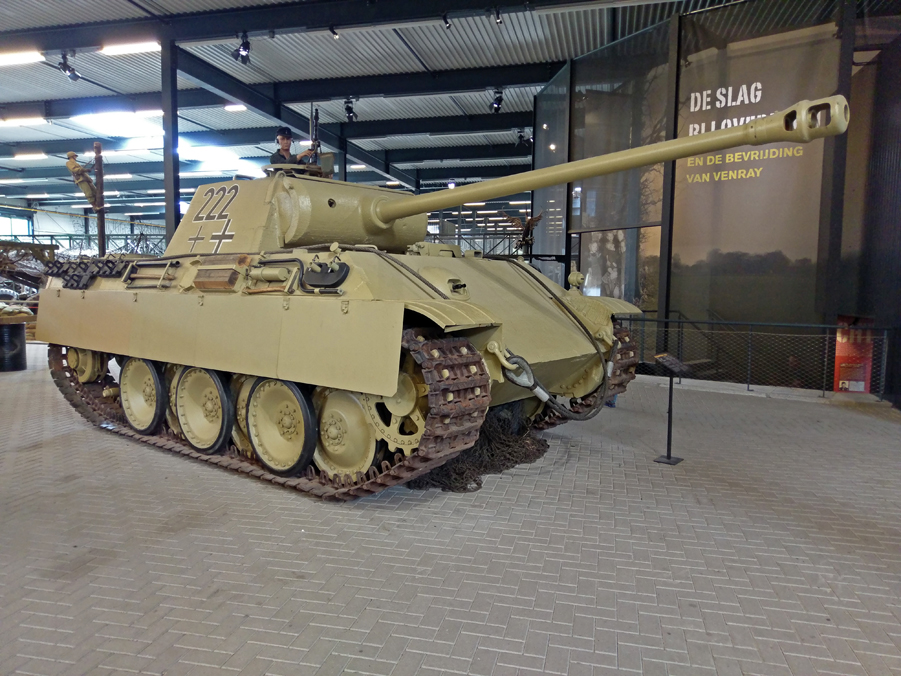
A German Panther tank, a veteran of the battle of Overloon, on exhibition

The Overloon War Museum (Dutch: Oorlogsmuseum Overloon) in full 'Foundation Dutch National War and Resistance Museum', is a Dutch historical and educational museum located in the North Brabant village of Overloon. It focuses on the history of World War II and more specifically World War II in The Netherlands.

The museum opened its doors to the public in May 1946, making it the oldest museum about World War II in Western Europe. Between 2006 and 2013, the museum operated under the name 'Liberty Park', after which the name was changed again to 'Oorlogsmuseum Overloon' in Dutch, Overloon War Museum in English. The museum is the largest of its kind in The Netherlands and consists of a wooded park (14 hectares) with a covered museum building. In 2024, the museum received 169,000 visitors.

== History ==
After the Battle of Overloon, an enormous amount of war materiel, including tanks and other vehicles, was left behind on the battlefield. Overlooner Harry van Daal was so shocked by the events that he proposed keeping a portion of the battlefield intact and turning it into a museum. On May 25, 1946, the National War and Resistance Museum was opened on behalf of British General Lashmer Gordon Whistler (1898-1963), commander of the 11th British Armored Division and the 3rd British Infantry Division that had liberated Overloon in October 1944. In 2006, the collection of the Marshall Museum from Zwijndrecht was added with more than 200 military vehicles and the name was changed to 'Liberty Park' from 2006 to 2013.

A feature of the museum is the large number of military vehicles and equipment on display, both German and Allied. For years these have been kept in the open air, but have recently been moved indoors to help preserve them. Many of the exhibited vehicles took part in the Battle of Overloon. In 2016, the collection was expanded with the collection of the Achterhoeks Museum 1940-1945, which closed its doors in 2015. The new exhibition of the Overloon War Museum includes the recognizable shop and café of the Achterhoeks Museum 1940-1945.

During the 2021 Christmas period, while the museum was closed due to restrictions from the COVID-19 pandemic in the Netherlands, the museum released a series of videos about subjects in its collection. One of these videos was about Vincent Speranza, an American veteran of the Second World War.

== Collection ==
The museum has a park of approximately 1000 by 500 m, making it one of the largest museums in the Netherlands in terms of land area. The special objects in the collection include:

- a Panther tank; this was disabled at the Battle of Overloon; the tank then stood outdoors for more than 50 years, but was since restored and is now displayed indoors
- a Soviet Union T-34 tank, in running condition; this is regularly used during demonstrations
- a B-25 Mitchell bomber, which was still part of the 320 Dutch Squadron RAF. This aircraft took part in the attacks on the Maas bridges of Venlo and Roermond at the end of 1944
- a Renault FT-17 tank, the only tank the Netherlands possessed in 1940, as a test model
- a Sherman tank, the most deployed American tank of the Second World War, on a trailer
- a Spitfire, the most famous British fighter aircraft of the war
- a German Biber mini-submarine
- an Airspeed Horsa MK1 Assault Glider, a large glider of which 916 were deployed during Market Garden
- a C-47 Skytrain (Dakota), the most used transport aircraft during World War II
- a British Churchill tank found just outside Overloon. 2 crew members died in this vehicle
- a crashed Lancaster, the parts of which visitors can still view
- an American Sherman Crab
- a British Cromwell tank
- Nazi-German radar installations, which played a major role in the Dutch air war that raged over the Netherlands for five years and cost 20,000 lives
- a forest course, where demonstration rides are made annually and re-enactments take place during Militracks (in May) and Eyewitness Event, among others

The museum also shows weapons, both cannons and small arms, uniforms of both the Allies and the Wehrmacht and military utensils, sometimes in recreated scenes. The museum also hosts temporary exhibitions.

In addition, in the forest park and in the halls there are a number of statues of Dutch and Allied main figures from the war, including Colonel Borghouts, Queen Wilhelmina and Prince Bernhard.

== See also ==
- Verzetsmuseum – Amsterdam, Netherlands
- Bundeswehr Museum of German Defense Technology – Koblenz, Germany
- Deutsches Panzermuseum – Munster, Germany
- Australian Armour and Artillery Museum – Australia
- Musée des Blindés – Paris, France
- Nationaal Militair Museum – Soesterberg, Netherlands
- Royal Tank Museum – Amman, Jordan
- The Tank Museum – Bovington, United Kingdom
- Ontario Regiment Museum – Oshawa, Canada
- United States Army Ordnance Museum
- Polish Army Museum – Warsaw, Poland
