= Holthees =

- Village
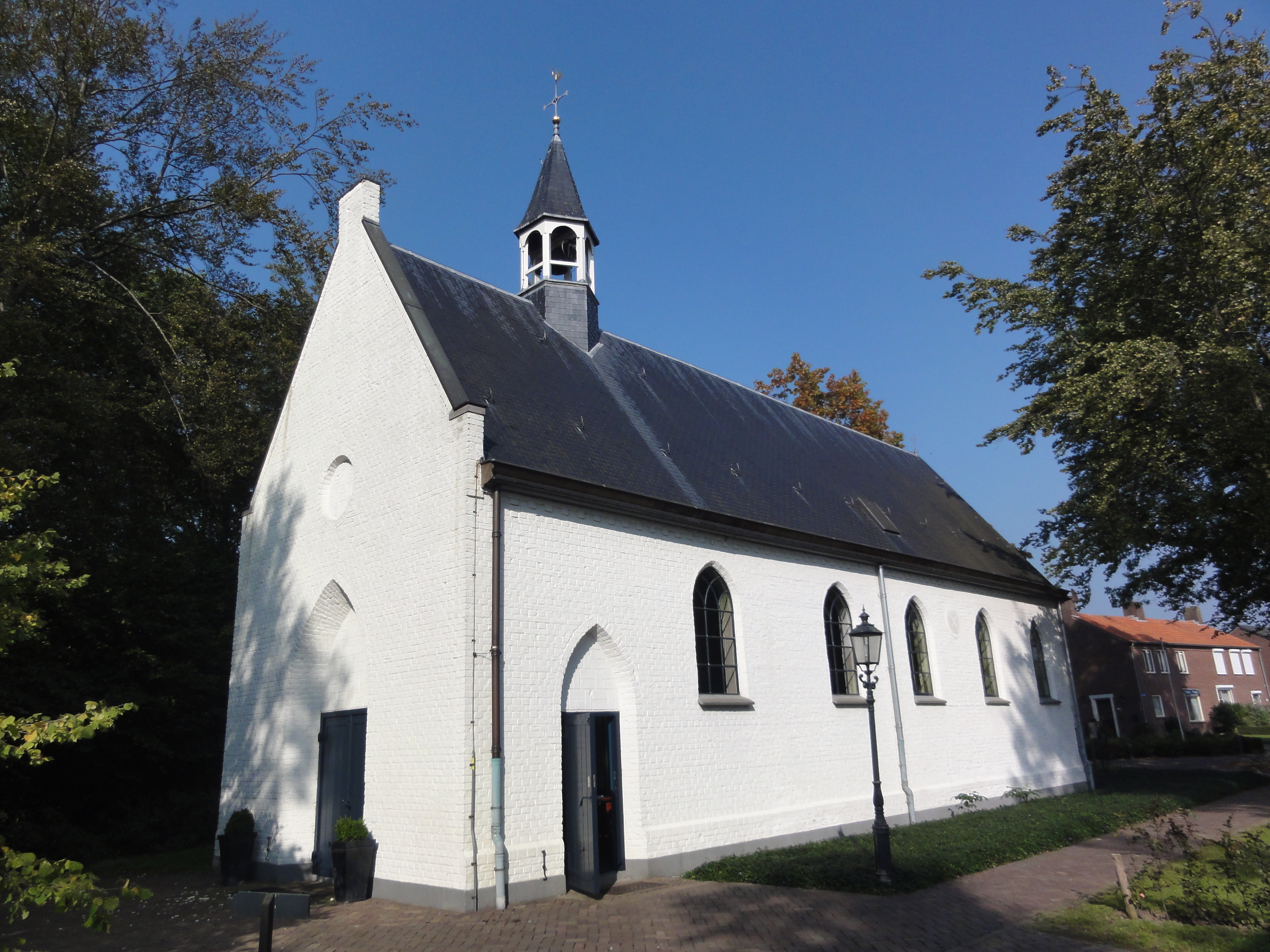
- Mariakapel (Mary Chapel)

- Location in the province of North Brabant in the Netherlands Holthees (Netherlands)
- Coordinates: 51°34′28″N 6°0′23″E
- Country: Netherlands
- Province: North Brabant
- Municipality: Land van Cuijk

Area
  - Total: 2.91 km^{2} (1.12 sq mi)
- Elevation: 16 m (52 ft)

Population (2021)
  - Total: 550
  - Density: 190/km^{2} (490/sq mi)
- Time zone: UTC+1 (CET)
  - Summer (DST): UTC+2 (CEST)
- Postal code: 5824
- Dialing code: 0478

Holthees is a village in the former municipality of Boxmeer on the border of the Dutch provinces North Brabant and Limburg. Since 2022 it has been part of the new municipality of Land van Cuijk.

== History ==
The name Holthees was mentioned for the first time in 1359. It is a composition of the German words hulta (wood) and hees (forest of thicket).

The Mariakapel (Mary Chapel) was built in the 15th century between Meppen castle and village. In 1648, the chapel was boarded up. The church was returned during the French occupation (early 19th century) and restored. In October 1944, it was destroyed by war. It was rebuilt after the war. It was decommissioned in 1997, and is now used for cultural activities.

Meppen castle was built in the 15th century and extended in the mid-17th century. In the mid-18th century, it was converted into a farm.

Holthees used to provide military support during the defence of the Land of Cuijk

Holthees forms a twin village with Smakt, a village in the municipality of Venray in the province of Limburg.

== Gallery ==
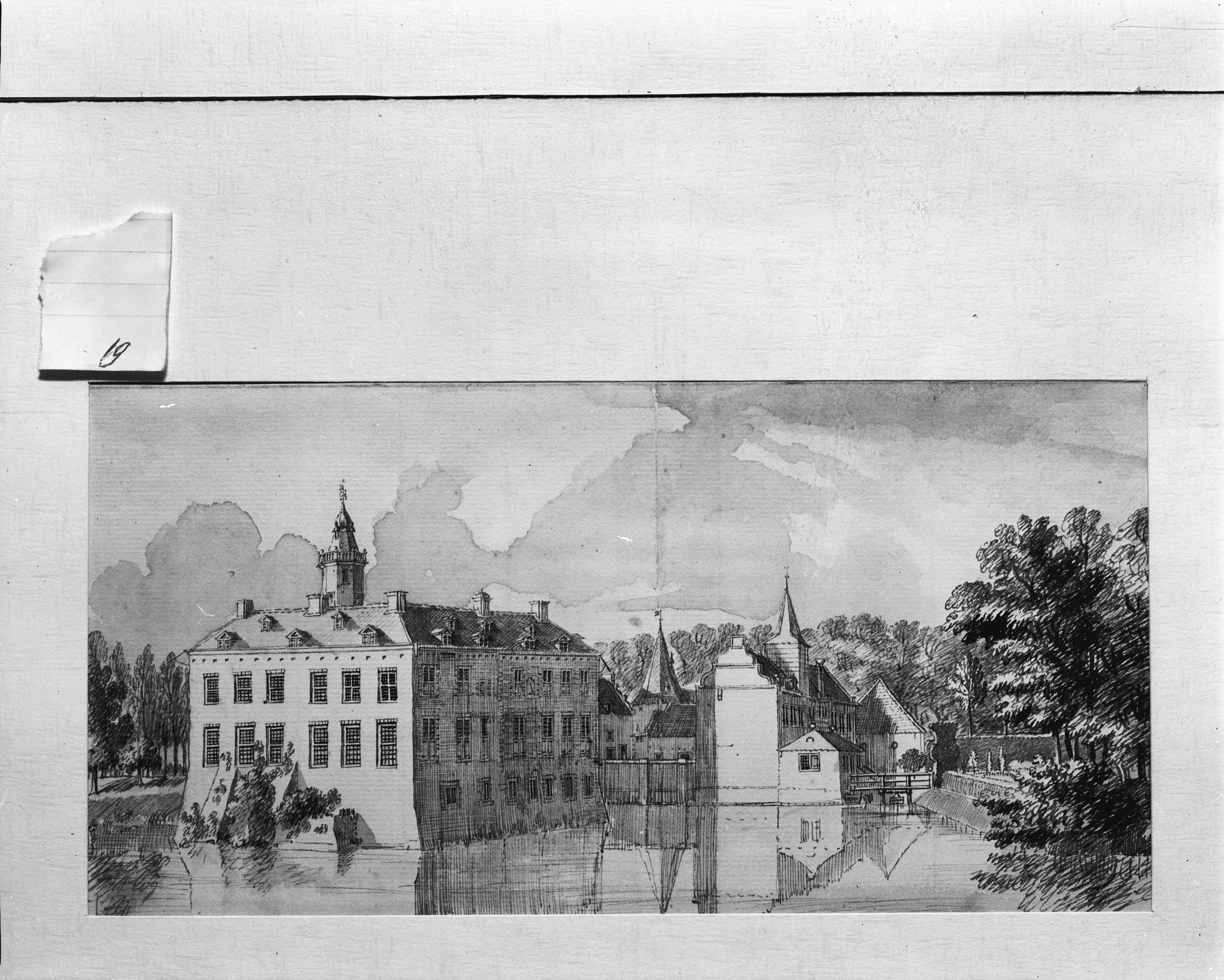
Drawing of Makken Castle

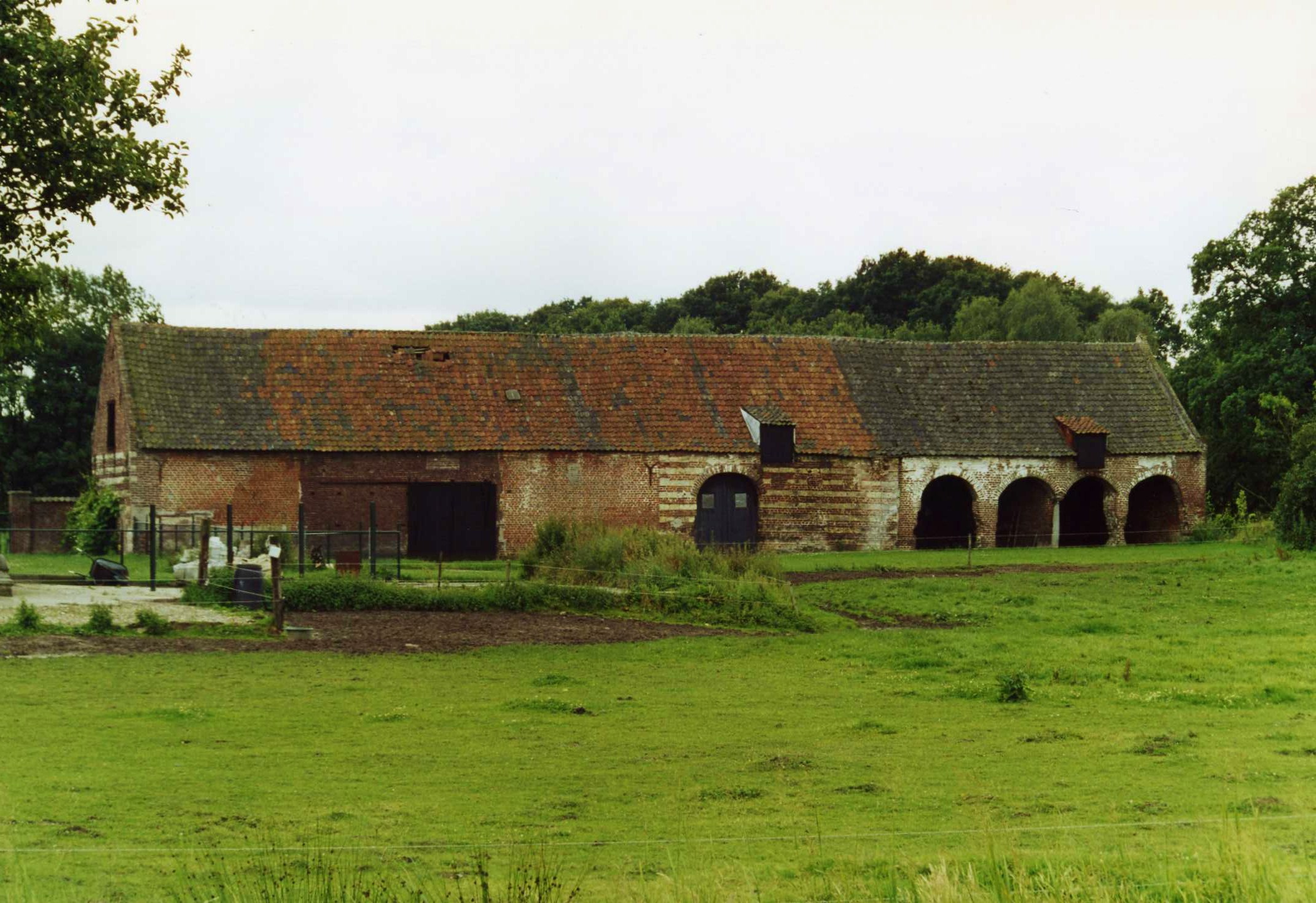
Farm with remnants of Makken Castle
