= Vierlingsbeek =

- Village
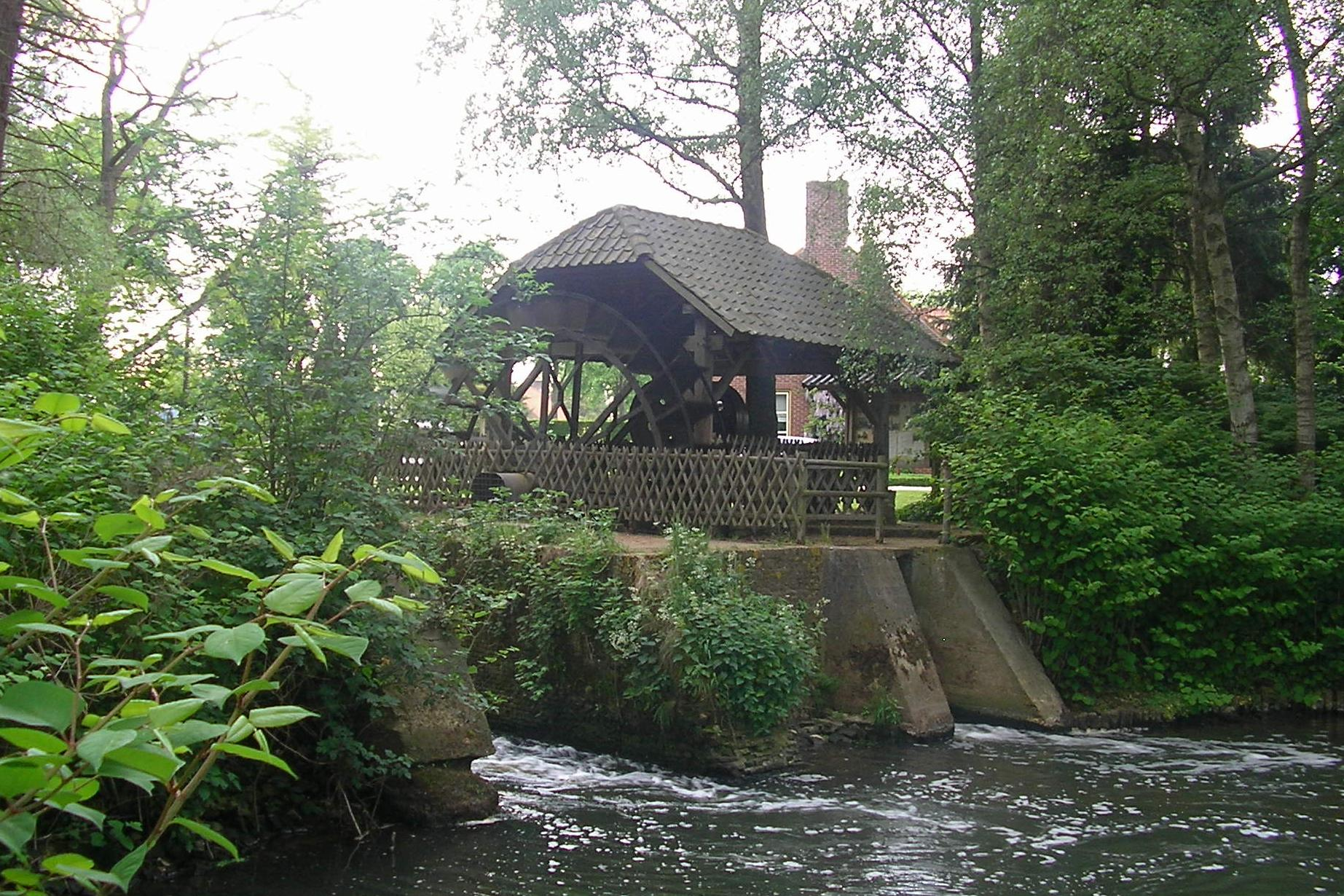
- Water mill

- Flag

- Location in the province of North Brabant in the Netherlands Vierlingsbeek (Netherlands)
- Coordinates: 51°35′46″N 6°0′37″E
- Country: Netherlands
- Province: North Brabant
- Municipality: Land van Cuijk

Area
  - Total: 17.38 km^{2} (6.71 sq mi)
- Elevation: 15 m (49 ft)

Population (2021)
  - Total: 2,645
  - Density: 152.2/km^{2} (394.2/sq mi)
- Time zone: UTC+1 (CET)
  - Summer (DST): UTC+2 (CEST)
- Postal code: 5821
- Dialing code: 0478

Vierlingsbeek (Dutch pronunciation: [ˌviːrlɪŋzˈbeːk]) is a village in the former municipality of Boxmeer in North Brabant province of the Netherlands. Until it was included in Boxmeer in 1998, it was a municipality of its own. Since 2022 it has been part of the new municipality of Land van Cuijk.

The UN/LOCODE is NLVIE.

== History ==
Vierlingsbeek developed in the Early Middle Ages on the river bank of the Maas. In 1756, the village was damaged by a large fire, and it developed along the Venraij to Boxmeer road.

The Dutch Reformed church was built in 1843 after its predecessor from 1804 had partially collapsed in 1839. The clergy house is the former hunting cabin of William I of the Netherlands. The church was decommissioned in 1997, and is used for weddings, concerts and cultural activities. The Catholic St. Laurentius Church was built between 1952 and 1953 after its 1804 predecessor had been destroyed in 1944.

Vierlingsbeek was home to 806 people in 1840. In 1883, a railway station opened on Nijmegen to Venlo railway line. The original building was destroyed in 1945. The village was heavily damaged in 1944.

Vierlingsbeek was an independent municipality until 1998 when it was merged into Boxmeer. In 2022, it became part of the Land van Cuijk.

== Gallery ==
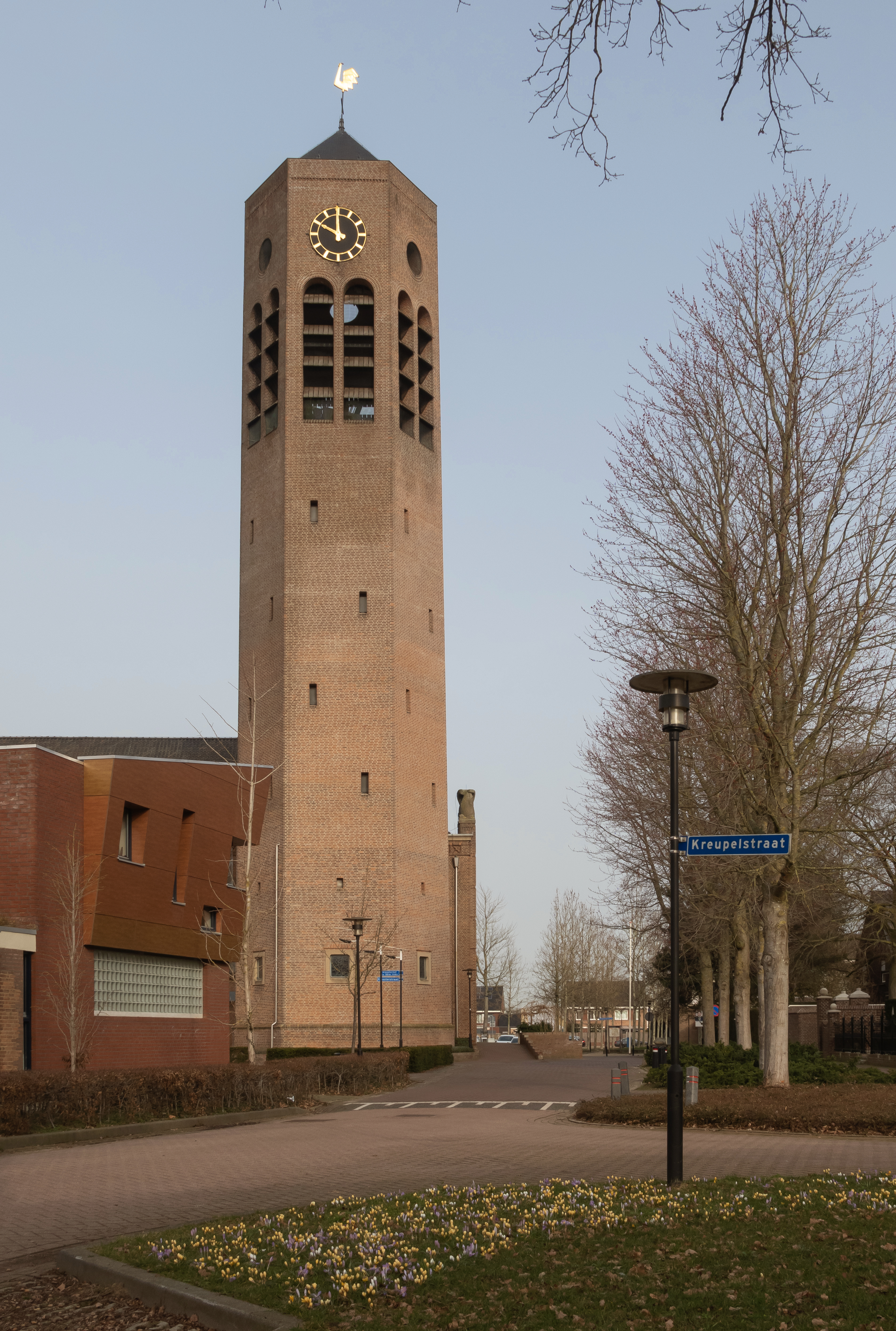
Church: Sint-Laurentiuskerk

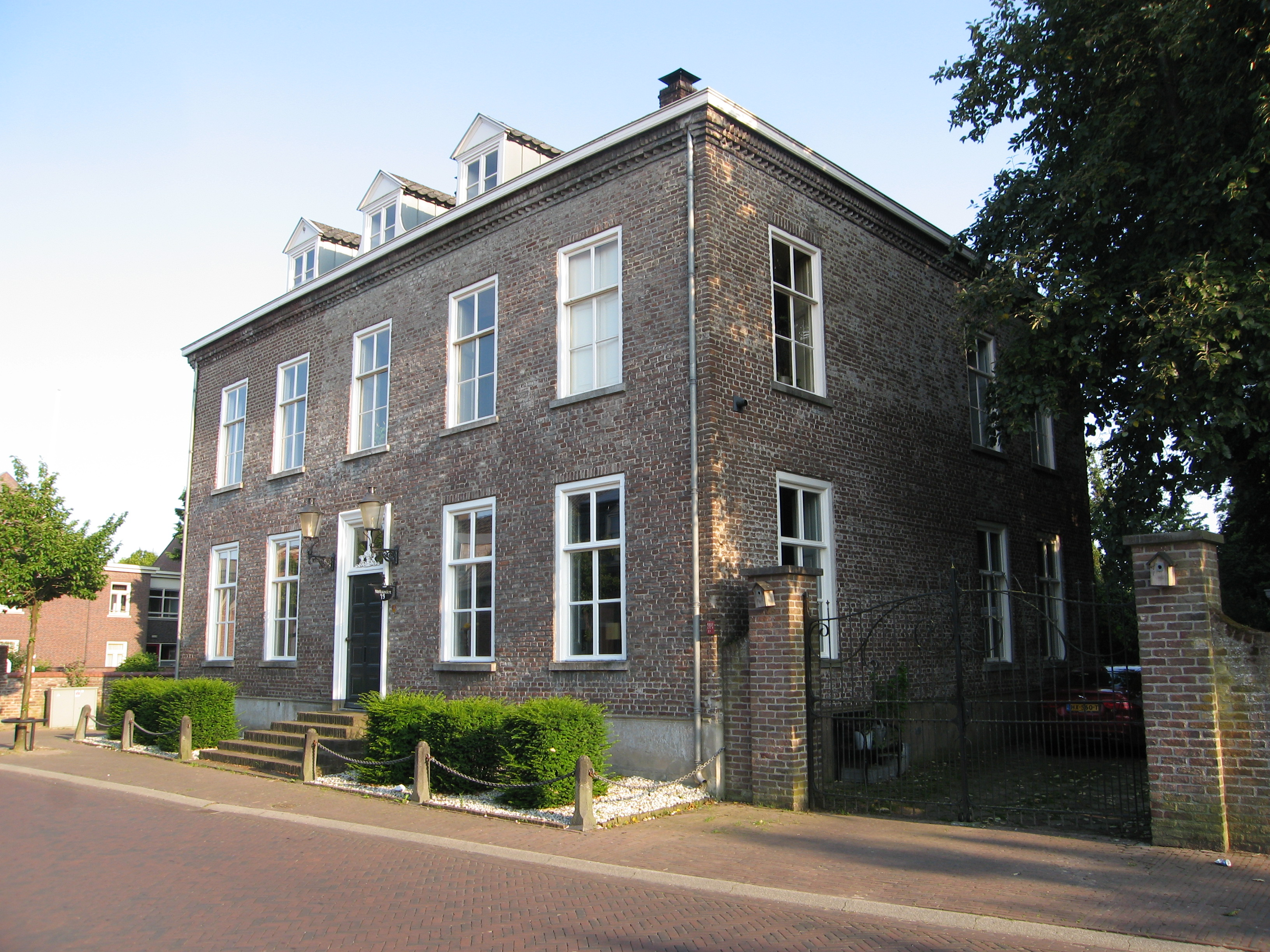
Villa in Vierlingsbeek

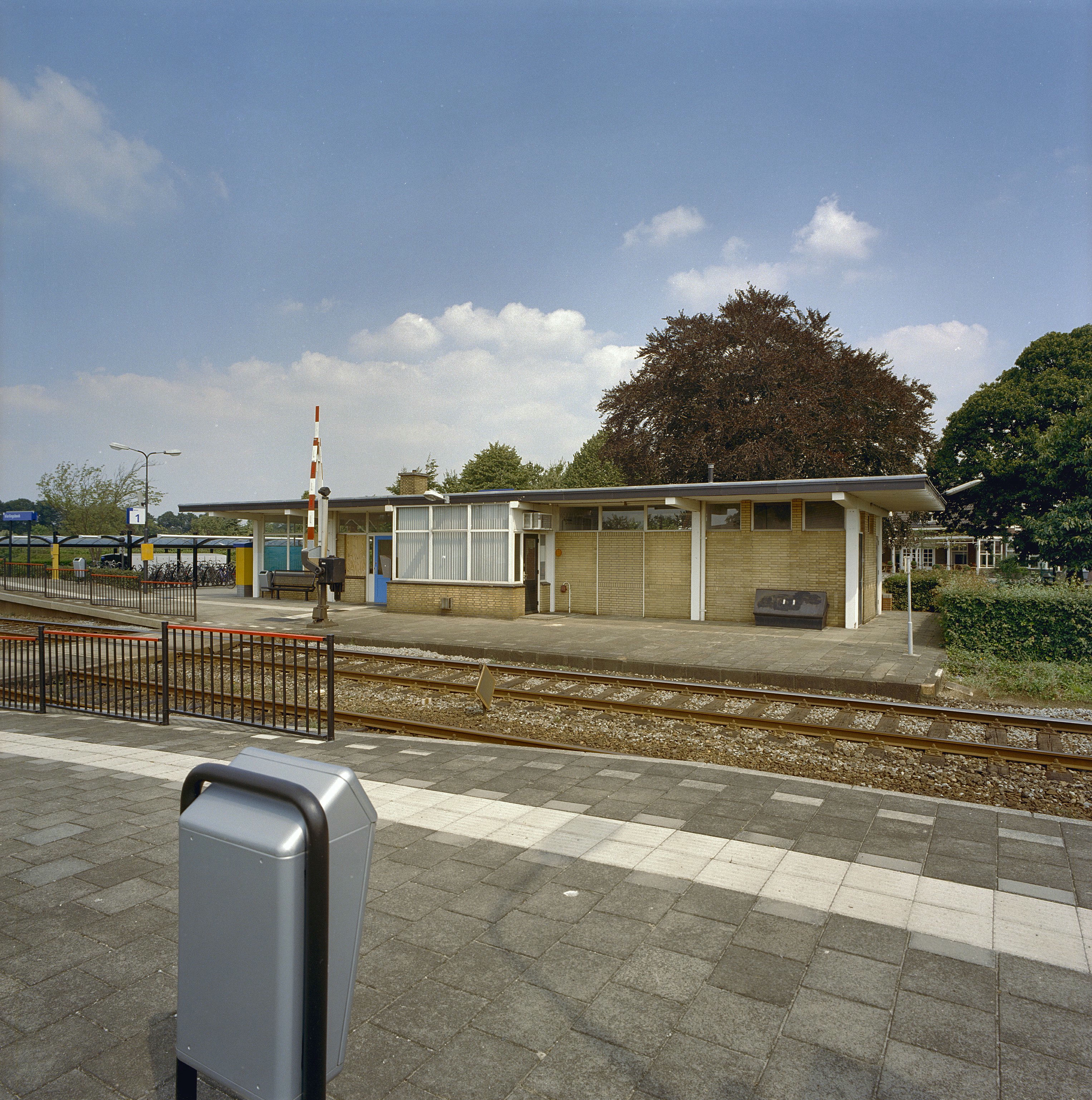
Railway station

Ferry
