= List of mayors of Moerdijk =

This is a list of mayors of Moerdijk, Netherlands.

In 1997 the municipality of Zevenbergen was created by the fusion of the municipalities of Fijnaart en Heijningen, Klundert, Standdaarbuiten, Willemstad and Zevenbergen. In 1998 the municipality was renamed to Moerdijk.

Mayors of Dutch municipalities are appointed by the cabinet in the name of the monarch, with advice of the city council.

== Mayors of Moerdijk ==
Period	Name of Mayor	Party	Notes
1997–2008	Henk (H.W.) den Duijn	VVD	
2008–2011	Wim (W.M.J.) Denie	PvdA	
2011	Jan (J.H.H.) Mans	PvdA	Acting
2011–2021	Jac (J.P.M.) Klijs	CDA	
2021–present	Aart-Jan (A.J.) Moerkerke	VVD	
