= Moerdijk (village) =

- Village
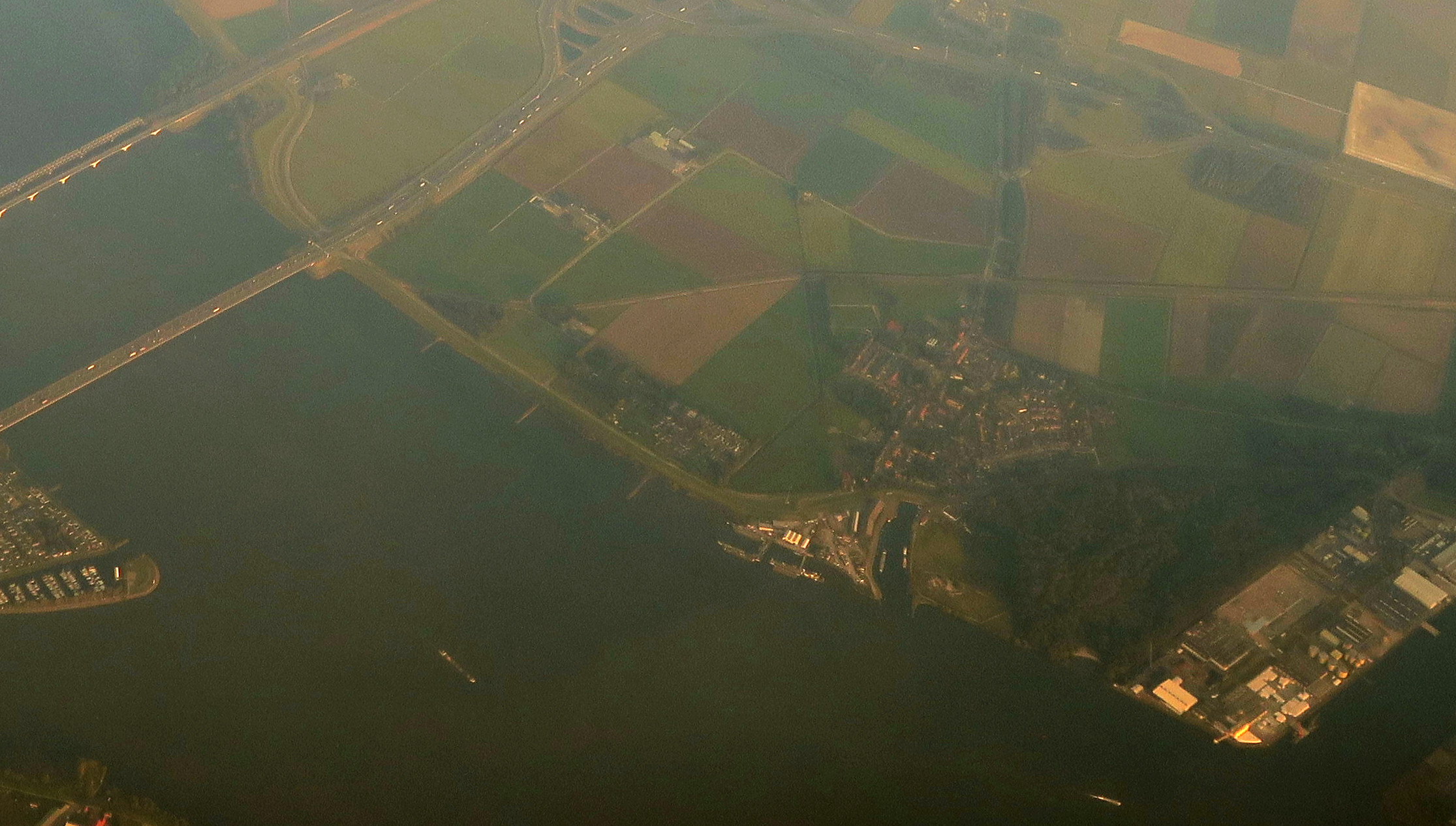
- Moerdijk, viewed toward the southeast in September 2017
- Interactive map of Moerdijk
- Coordinates: 51°42′11″N 4°37′53″E
- Country: Netherlands
- Province: North Brabant
- Municipality: Moerdijk

Population (2023)
  - Total: 1,322
- Postal code: 4780–4782
- Website: Official municipal website

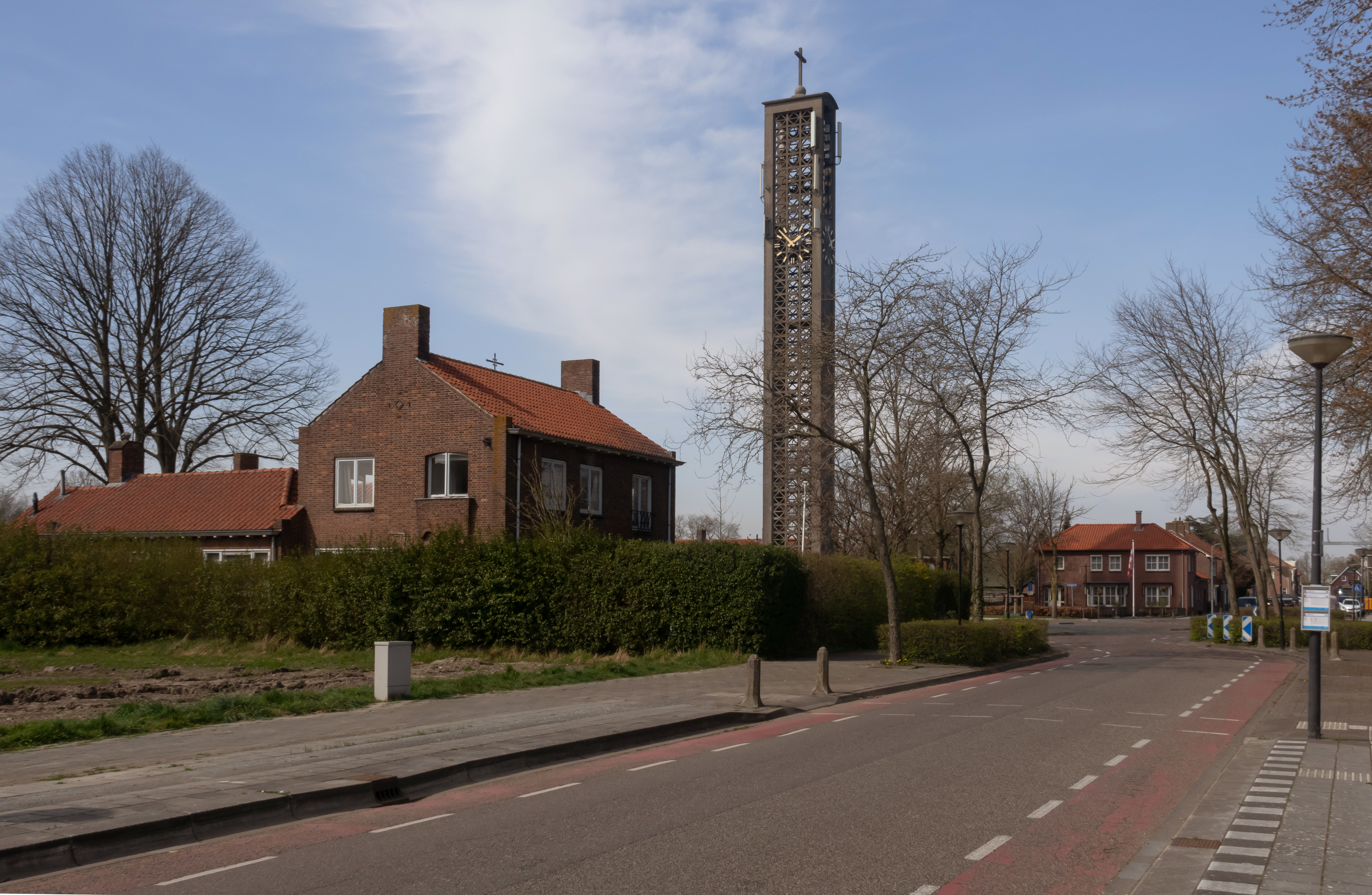
The village center of Moerdijk

Moerdijk is a village in the municipality of Moerdijk, in the Dutch province of North Brabant. In 2005, the village had 1322 inhabitants.

Before 1997, the village was divided between two municipalities: the western part belonged to Klundert, and the eastern part to Hooge en Lage Zwaluwe. During the municipal reorganization of 1997, Moerdijk, together with the municipalities of Klundert, Willemstad, and Fijnaart, was merged into the municipality of Zevenbergen. In 1998, this municipality changed its name to Moerdijk.

In 2025, it was announced that the village would be demolished to make way for an expansion in the Moerdijk port-industrial area, which the government claimed was designated to be a key hub for the future of energy infrastructure in the country, and development will begin in 2028.

Moerdijk lies on the southern side of the Moerdijk bridges and the Service Tunnel Hollandsch Diep.

== Etymology ==
The name Moerdijk is related to the peat bogs that once existed here, which were exploited for peat extraction and turf production. The land that was worked was surrounded by dikes, hence the name “Moerdijk” ("moor dike").

== History ==
Moerdijk may already have existed in 967 under the name Sprangblok. Large-scale peat extraction began here before 1380. At that time, the Hollands Diep was a much narrower creek called Wijvekeen, which was not yet connected to the Merwede. Beginning in 1367, the dikes frequently burst, culminating in the disastrous St. Elizabeth's Flood of 1421. Around 1450, peat extraction came to an end, partly because a thick layer of clay had been deposited over the peat. From then on, raw sea salt from the Mediterranean region was imported instead.

Gradually, the land was diked again. Before 1600, the Island of Moerdijk was provided with embankments, and from the south, mud flats gradually silted up and were reclaimed, so that the island eventually became connected again to the reclaimed mainland. In 1650, the Royale Dijk ("Royal Dike") was constructed, which enclosed the newly formed Hollands Diep.

Meanwhile, a ferry connection had been established at Moerdijk across the Hollands Diep to the Island of Dordrecht. In 1820, the road to Breda was paved with cobblestones, and in 1822 the Moerdijk–Willemsdorp ferry service began operation. In 1855, a railway line from Antwerp via Roosendaal to the port of Moerdijk was opened. This was the Grand National Belge, which had at Moerdijk the Moerdijk AR station. In 1863, another line from Breda to the Moerdijk port followed, ending at Moerdijk SS station. Finally, in 1872 the first Moerdijk Bridge was opened—a railway bridge. This ended the ferry service, but the rise of the automobile led to its reinstatement in 1912. A road bridge followed in 1936, and a new, wider one opened in 1978. A high-speed rail bridge was added after 2004.

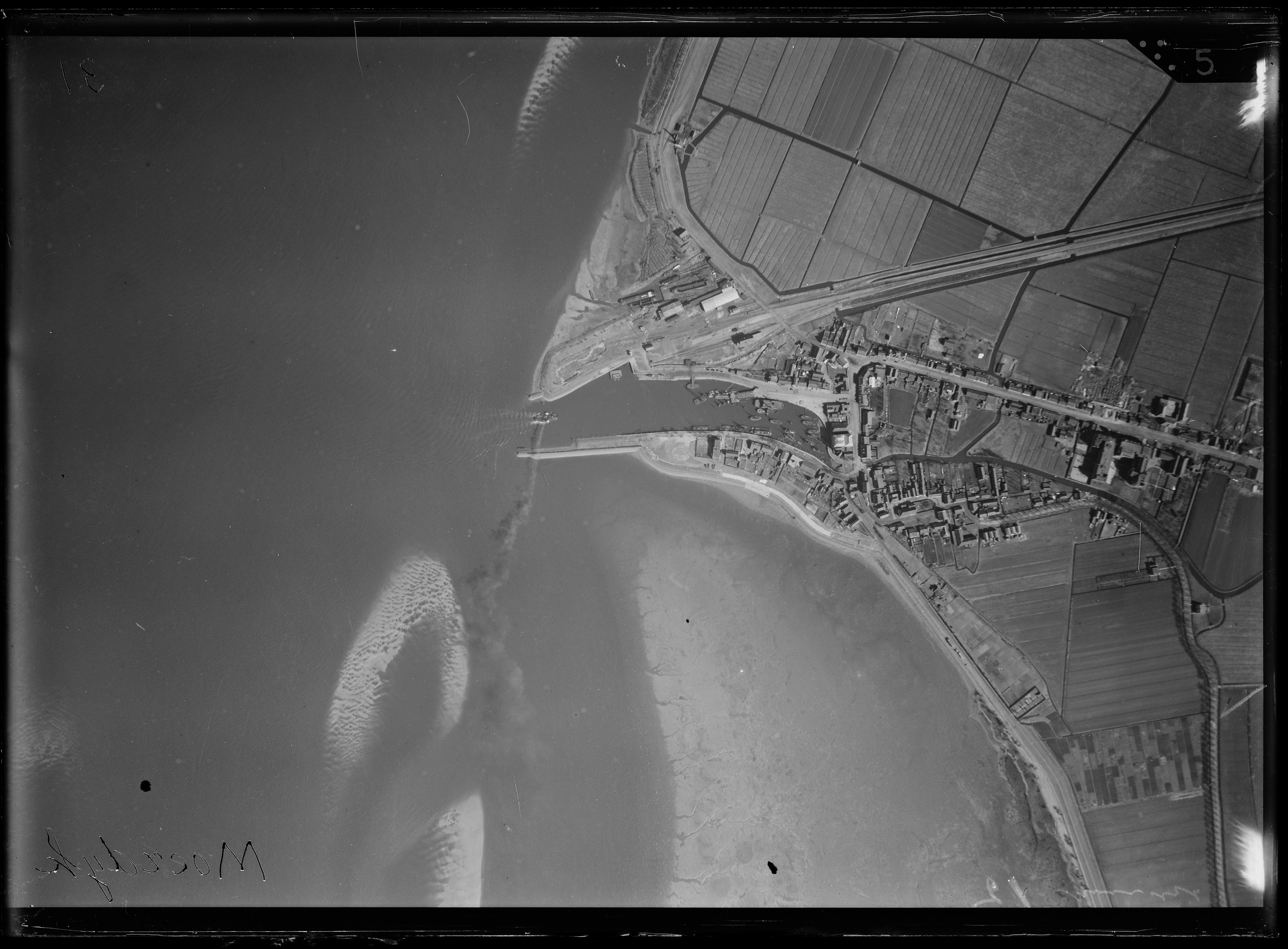
Aerial photograph of Moerdijk, 1920–1940

Originally, Moerdijk was little more than a ferry harbor with a ferry house and a few dozen homes. The inhabitants lived partly from fishing. There was also a soap factory and the shipyard of the De Korte brothers, which went bankrupt in the 1930s.

West of Moerdijk, plans were developed from 1968 onward for what became the 2,500-hectare Port and industrial area Moerdijk. The largest establishment there was Shell Moerdijk, which processed petroleum products from Shell Pernis into base materials for the plastics industry. Construction began in 1970.

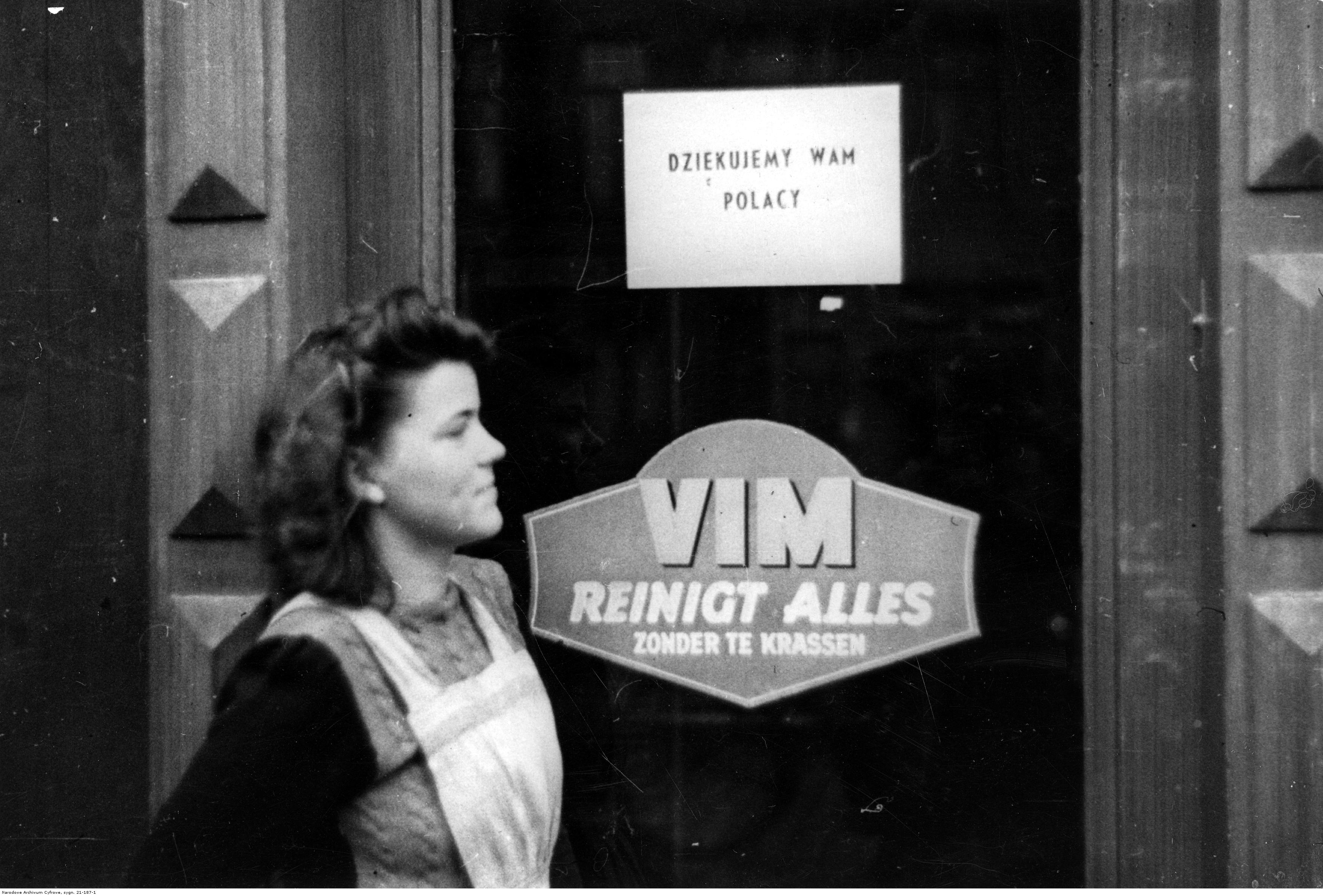
Polish inscription “Thank you, Poland” in Moerdijk, liberated by the 1st Polish Armoured Division, November 1944

Later plans proposed a new large-scale industrial zone of 420 ha called Moerdijkse Hoek. Eventually, the triangle between Zevenbergen, Zevenbergschen Hoek, and Moerdijk would have been fully built up, surrounding the village with industry. Alternatives were later found through redevelopment of the existing industrial area. Nevertheless, new proposals emerged for a Logistics Park of 150 ha at the junction of A17 and A16, again close to Moerdijk’s core.

At the end of 1944, Moerdijk suffered heavy war damage because it lay on the front line. Many houses were demolished to create clear firing fields, and the liberation on 9 November 1944 was preceded by intense fighting. On 29 September 1944, Moerdijk was bombed: 55 percent of the village was completely destroyed and 35 percent heavily damaged. The North Sea flood of 1953 also caused great damage. As a result, much of the village’s housing dates from the 1950s. Later, several small housing estates were added. However, the level of amenities in Moerdijk remains low, with only a few shops.

On the religious front, a Reformed church was inaugurated in 1815, a Catholic church in 1863, and in 1886 the Sisters of the Most Sacred Heart of Jesus arrived. They were also known as the Sisters of Moerdijk and owned a large motherhouse complex. There was also a Reformed church.

In 1944, all church and convent buildings were destroyed by warfare, except for the Reformed church, which survived. Most of the sisters moved to Koningshof, but the priest Bernardus Joannes Koldewey built another convent with chapel at Steenweg 41. A few years later, a school was added, later used as the primary school De Burg. The sisters have since left; the school was demolished and merged into IBS De Klaverhoek, and the convent building is now used as a residence.

Polygoon newsreel, 1953: the railway line over the Moerdijk restored

Expansion of the port and industrial area near the A16 and A17 has led to depopulation and expropriations in the village. In 2013, a commission chaired by former minister Ed Nijpels was established to examine the village’s future. One proposal of the Nijpels Commission was a departure compensation scheme for residents worth €10 million, and an additional €8 million investment in the village’s livability.

== Nickname: Fishermen of Moerdijk ==
Before 1940, forty families in Moerdijk earned their livelihood from fishing. The fishermen of Moerdijk used schokkers—flat-bottomed boats equipped with anchor nets and beam trawls. They mainly fished for smelt, which was also exported. The smelt was seasoned and pickled in vinegar, earning the fishermen the nickname “smelt curers” (spieringkruiers).

Fishing took place on the great rivers and the Zeeland waters, and after 1945 also on the Western Scheldt. The Delta Works largely brought Moerdijk’s inland fishery to an end. Some fishermen continued their trade at sea, operating from Den Oever, Stellendam, or Goedereede. Only one family still fishes from Moerdijk today, operating on the Hollands Diep and the Haringvliet.

== Sights and monuments ==
- The Mary Chapel (Mariakapel), designed by Jos. Bedaux, was consecrated in 1939. It was an initiative of Brabantia Nostra, an association promoting what it saw as Brabant’s cultural identity. The statue of the Madonna and Child was carved from limestone by Manus Evers. The chapel stood at the point where travelers from the north, crossing the Moerdijk Bridge, entered North Brabant. Visitors were greeted with the inscription:

Traveller, halt! You are welcome here,
For now you enter Brabant dear.
Remember, this proud Duchy’s fame;
She reigns its Duchess, in Her name.

This prominent chapel was demolished in 1968 to make way for the widening of the A16 motorway. A new concrete structure was later built in its place, now located opposite Lage Zwaluwe railway station, largely hidden amid the surrounding infrastructure.

- The Reformed Church, at Wilhelminaplein 1, was built in 1815 and is notable because the church and rectory are aligned end-to-end. The small hall church is topped by a bell turret. In 2005, it became part of the Protestant Church (PKN). Its organ was built in 1972 by A. H. de Graaf of Leusden.
- The Gereformeerde Church, at Grindweg 82, was built in 1953. It replaced an earlier building on Zwaluwsedijk that had been destroyed in 1944. The present church, featuring an octagonal tower, is an example of post-war reconstruction architecture. Architect: C. van der Bom. In 2005, the church was deconsecrated following the creation of the PKN and temporarily leased to the religious community Order of the Transformers. Complaints about loud amplified singing led to their departure. In 2007, the building was sold to a family and converted into a private home, with its exterior preserved.

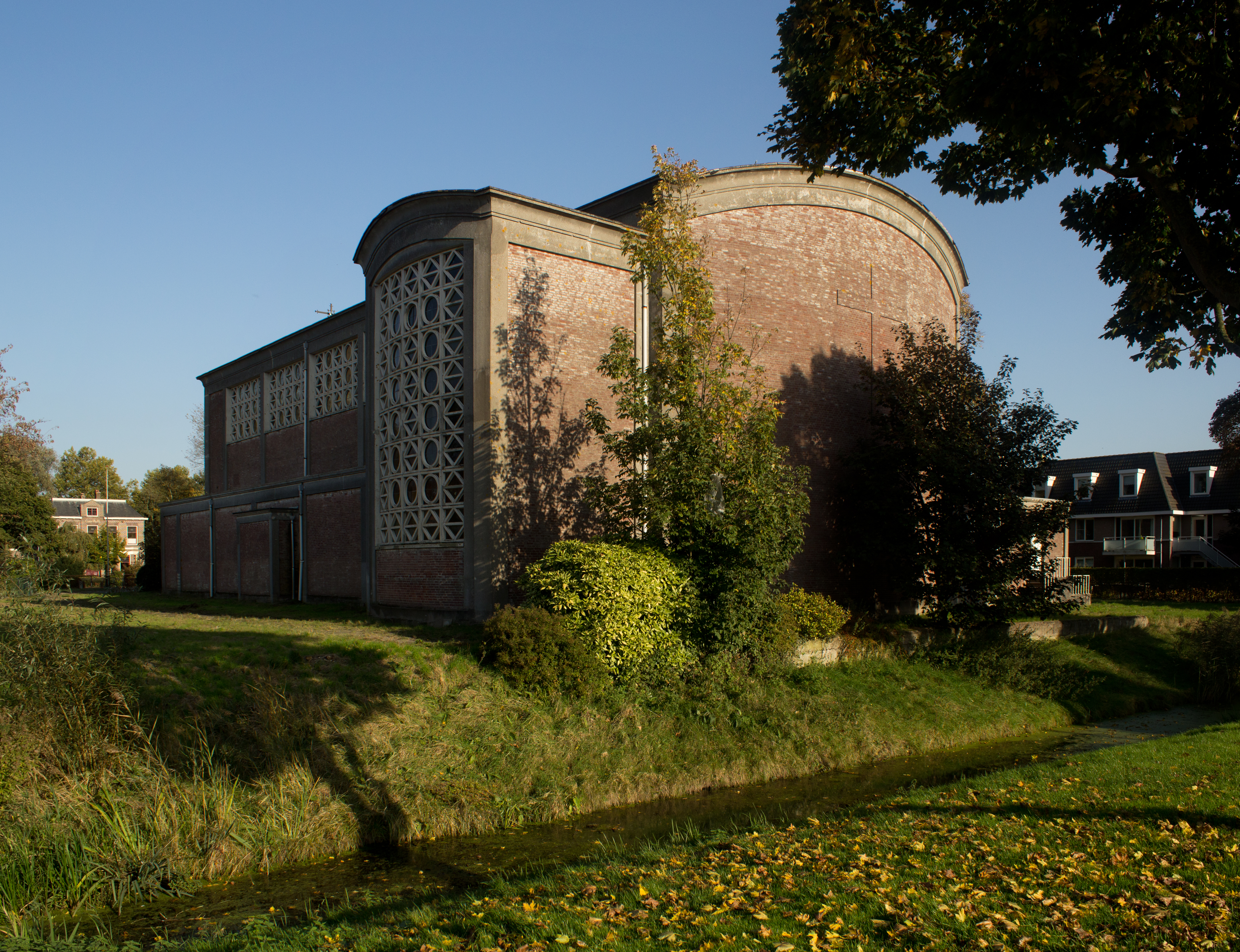
The St. Stephen’s Church in Moerdijk

- The St. Stephen’s Church, at Steenweg 49, had two predecessors: one from 1861, demolished in 1930 after a new church by architect Jacques van Groenendael was completed in 1929. That church was destroyed by warfare in 1944. A new modernist church was built in 1956, designed by J. J. M. van Halteren. The concrete church features a freestanding tower. In 2011, it was deconsecrated and is expected to be replaced by a community center that will also host services. The tower may be preserved. The church’s significant organ, built in 1964 by Marcussen & Søn, awaits a new home. Inside is a Stations of the Cross series of fifteen stations (the fifteenth representing the Resurrection) by Charles Eyck.
- The War Memorial on the Havendijk is designed as a bell frame.
- The Koning Haakonstraat and Julianastraat feature wooden houses donated by Norway to the victims of the North Sea flood of 1953.

== Nature and landscape ==
The village of Moerdijk lies primarily in a marine clay area and is dominated by the broad expanse of the Hollands Diep and the Moerdijk bridges. Between the village core and the large industrial zone lies the old harbor and the nature and recreation area called De Appelzak.

This area forms part of a 258-hectare compensation zone, established in the 1970s, known as Moerdijk, intended to offset the negative environmental effects of constructing the industrial area. It is managed by Staatsbosbeheer (the Dutch State Forestry Service) and includes meadows, young stands of poplar and ash trees, and open recreational spaces.

The Roode Vaart canal discharges into the industrial harbor here.

In the Hollands Diep, west of Moerdijk, lies the Sassenplaat nature reserve.

== Fires ==
On the afternoon of 5 January 2011, a major fire broke out at the chemical company Chemie-Pack. People in a wide area, including parts of the Randstad and central Netherlands, were advised to keep windows and doors closed.

On 3 June 2014, another large fire occurred at the Shell refinery on the same industrial site. The blaze was accompanied by two very loud explosions that were visible and audible tens of kilometres away.

On 12 May 2015, yet another major fire took place, following an explosion at the recycling company Remondis Argentia, also located within the same industrial complex.

== Notable people ==
- Niek van Leest (1930-2012), painter and sculptor; Born in Moerdijk

== Trivia ==
The Hollands Diep seems to mark the boundary between two cultural worlds; a “Dutch” (Hollandic, Protestant) one to the north and a “Brabantine” (Catholic) one to the south.

Although this distinction is somewhat simplistic; historically, much of present-day North Brabant belonged to the former County of Holland until the late 18th century, and the Hollands Diep never actually formed the border between Holland and Brabant until the creation of the Department of Brabant in 1807; the river is often used in popular speech to symbolize that divide.

Thus, people often refer to areas “north of the rivers” (boven de rivieren; northern, Calvinist Holland) and “south of the rivers” (beneden de rivieren, southern, Catholic Brabant).

Similarly, the expressions “above the Moerdijk” and “below the Moerdijk” are used and even “over the Moerdijk” to mean “the others.” In French, (Francophone) Belgians use the expression “outre-Moerdijk” (“beyond the Moerdijk”) to refer to the Dutch.
