= Moerdijk (disambiguation) =

Moerdijk is a town in the South of the Netherlands.

Moerdijk may also refer to:

- Moerdijk bridges, Island of Dordrecht, Netherlands
- Moerdijk (village)

== People with the surname ==
- Gerard Moerdijk (1890–1958), South African architect
- Ieke Moerdijk (born 1958), Dutch mathematician
