= Moerdijk =

- Municipality
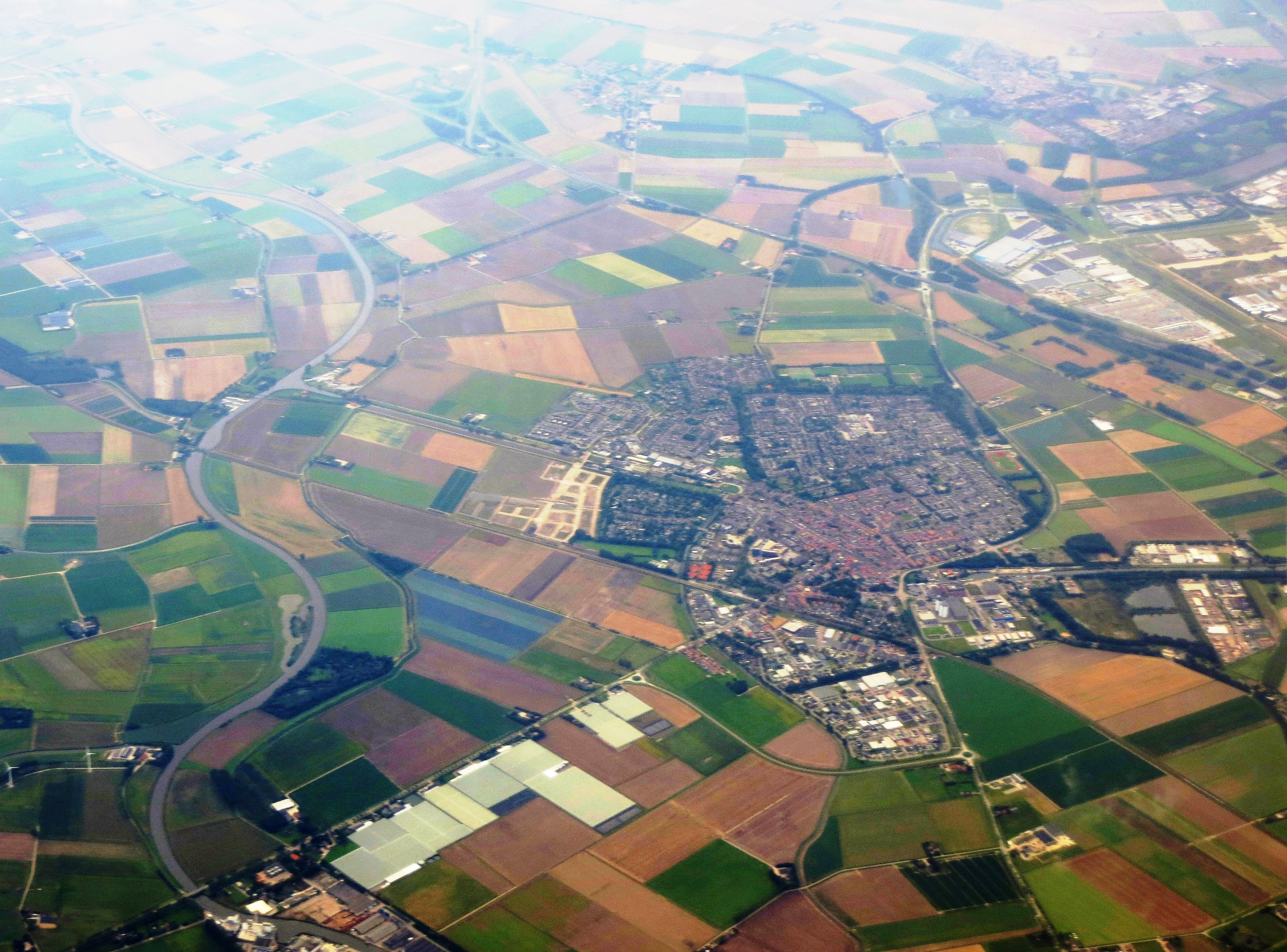
- Aerial view over Moerdijk (Zevenbergen in centre)

- Flag Coat of arms

- Location in North Brabant
- Coordinates: 51°39′N 4°36′E
- Country: Netherlands
- Province: North Brabant

Government
  - Body: Municipal council
  - Mayor: Aart-Jan Moerkerke (VVD)

Area
  - Total: 184.03 km^{2} (71.05 sq mi)
  - Land: 159.15 km^{2} (61.45 sq mi)
  - Water: 24.88 km^{2} (9.61 sq mi)
- Elevation: 1 m (3.3 ft)

Population (January 2021)
  - Total: 37,185
  - Density: 234/km^{2} (610/sq mi)
- Time zone: UTC+1 (CET)
  - Summer (DST): UTC+2 (CEST)
- Postcode: 4758–4797
- Area code: 0168
- Website: www.moerdijk.nl

Moerdijk (Dutch pronunciation: [muːrˈdɛik]) is a municipality, that includes also a village with the same name, in the province of North Brabant, the Netherlands.

== History ==
The municipality of Moerdijk was founded in 1997 following the merger of the municipalities of Fijnaart en Heijningen, Klundert, Standdaarbuiten, Willemstad, and Zevenbergen. At that time the new municipality was called Zevenbergen. The name changed to Moerdijk on 1 April 1998.

- List of mayors of Moerdijk

== Population centres ==
- Fijnaart en Heijningen
- Klundert
- Heijningen
- Helwijk
- Langeweg
- Moerdijk
- Noordhoek
- Standdaarbuiten
- Willemstad
- Zevenbergen
- Zevenbergschen Hoek

=== Topography ===
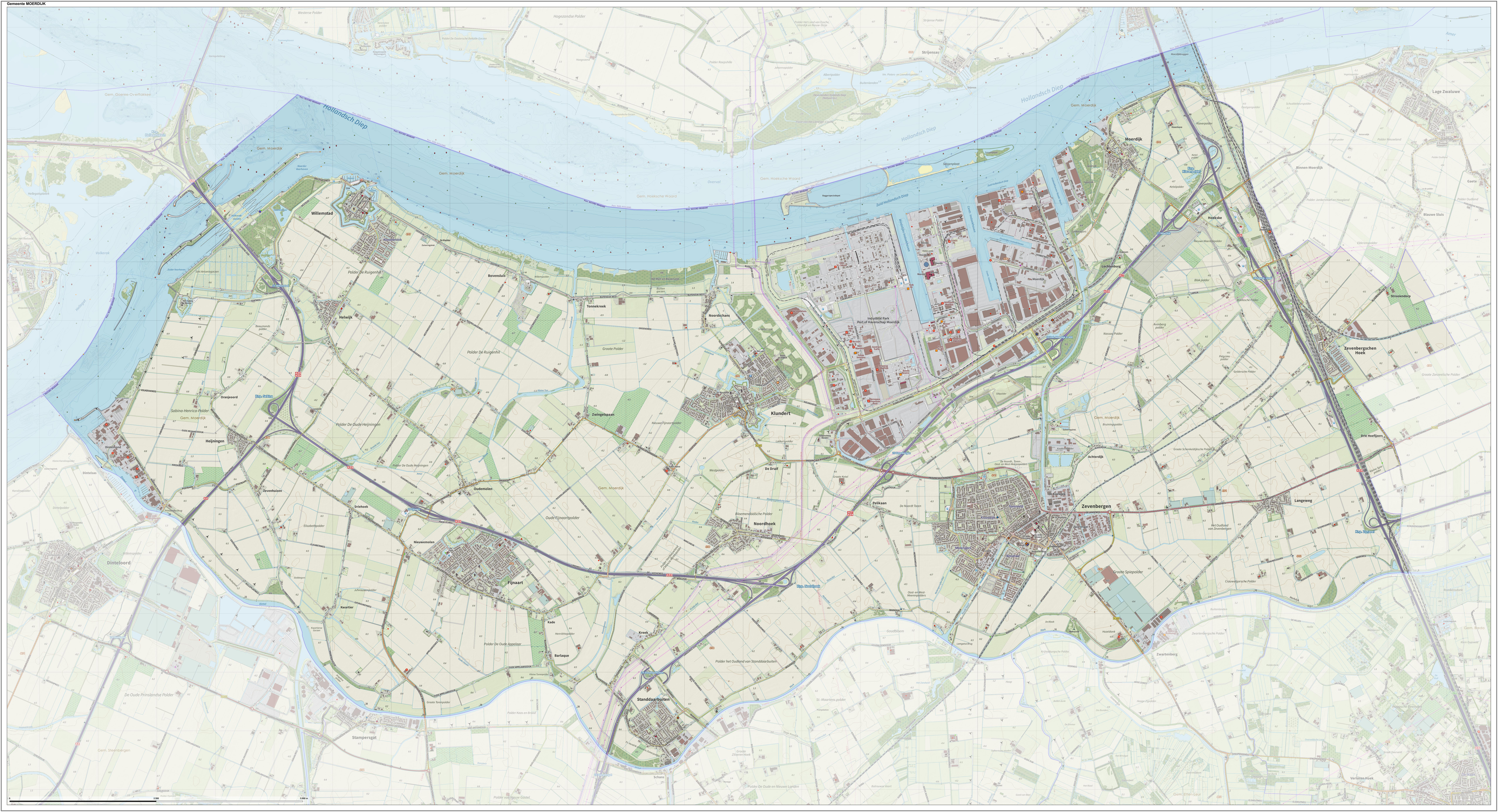

Dutch Topographic map of the municipality of Moerdijk, June 2015

=== The village of Moerdijk ===
The village of Moerdijk is one of the smaller villages of the municipality. Population as of 2002 is 1,205. Moerdijk is however a well-known name in the Netherlands, because of the large Moerdijk industrial area, with a large power plant, and because of the well-known Moerdijk bridges (highway and railway bridges) across the Hollands Diep. This was the last bridge available for the retreat from the vital Scheldt Estuary of the rapidly collapsing German defences near Antwerp in World War II. (Noteworthy as well, the Moerdijk bridges were one of the first targets of guided, or "smart bombs"- by American heavy bombers in late 1944.)

Moerdijk made headlines on 5 January 2011 because of a large fire at Chemie-Pack (a firm processing numerous chemicals) causing a large cloud of toxic smoke to blow over the surrounding area, mostly to the north of Moerdijk.

Above the Moerdijk (meaning "north of Moerdijk") is used as an expression in Belgium and the southern parts of the Netherlands to mean "in the Netherlands" or "in Holland".

Below the Moerdijk (meaning "south of Moerdijk" or "below the major rivers") is also a Dutch expression for the Catholic provinces North Brabant and Limburg. This expression is used particularly around Mardi Gras in relation to the region's traditional carnival culture, which (with a few local exceptions) does not exist north of the major rivers.

Over de Moerdijk (meaning "across the Moerdijk") is used by either party to mean the other one.

=== Zevenbergen ===
Zevenbergen is the largest town of the municipality (population as of 2002: 14,006). It is located about 10 km northwest of Breda. It received city rights in 1427.

Zevenbergen has a train station with connections to Dordrecht and Roosendaal.

== Transport ==
Railway Dordrecht to Roosendaal (part of line 11), with stations and official station abbreviations:

- Dordrecht (Ddr) (mun. Dordrecht)
- Dordrecht Zuid (Ddzd) (mun. Dordrecht)
- Lage Zwaluwe (Zlw) (mun. Moerdijk)
- Zevenbergen (Zvb) (mun. Moerdijk)
- Oudenbosch (Odb) (mun. Halderberge)
- Roosendaal (Rsd) (mun. Roosendaal)

Close to Hollands Diep, the area is now used for industrial movements by water, with great inland access as well the access into the North Sea, transport company Van der Vlist have their own port located in the area, and many other transport companies have nearby offices.

== Notable people ==
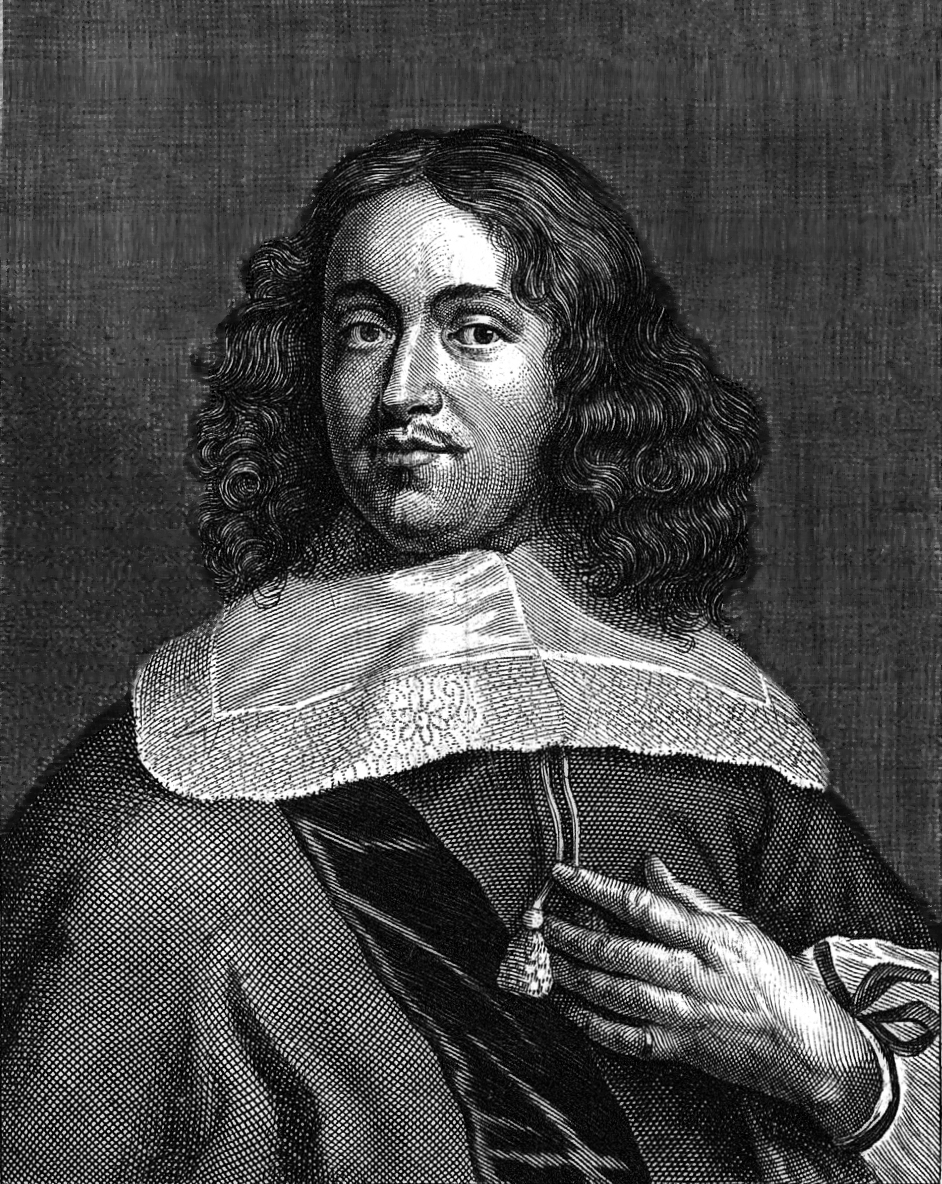
Henry Berkmans, 1662

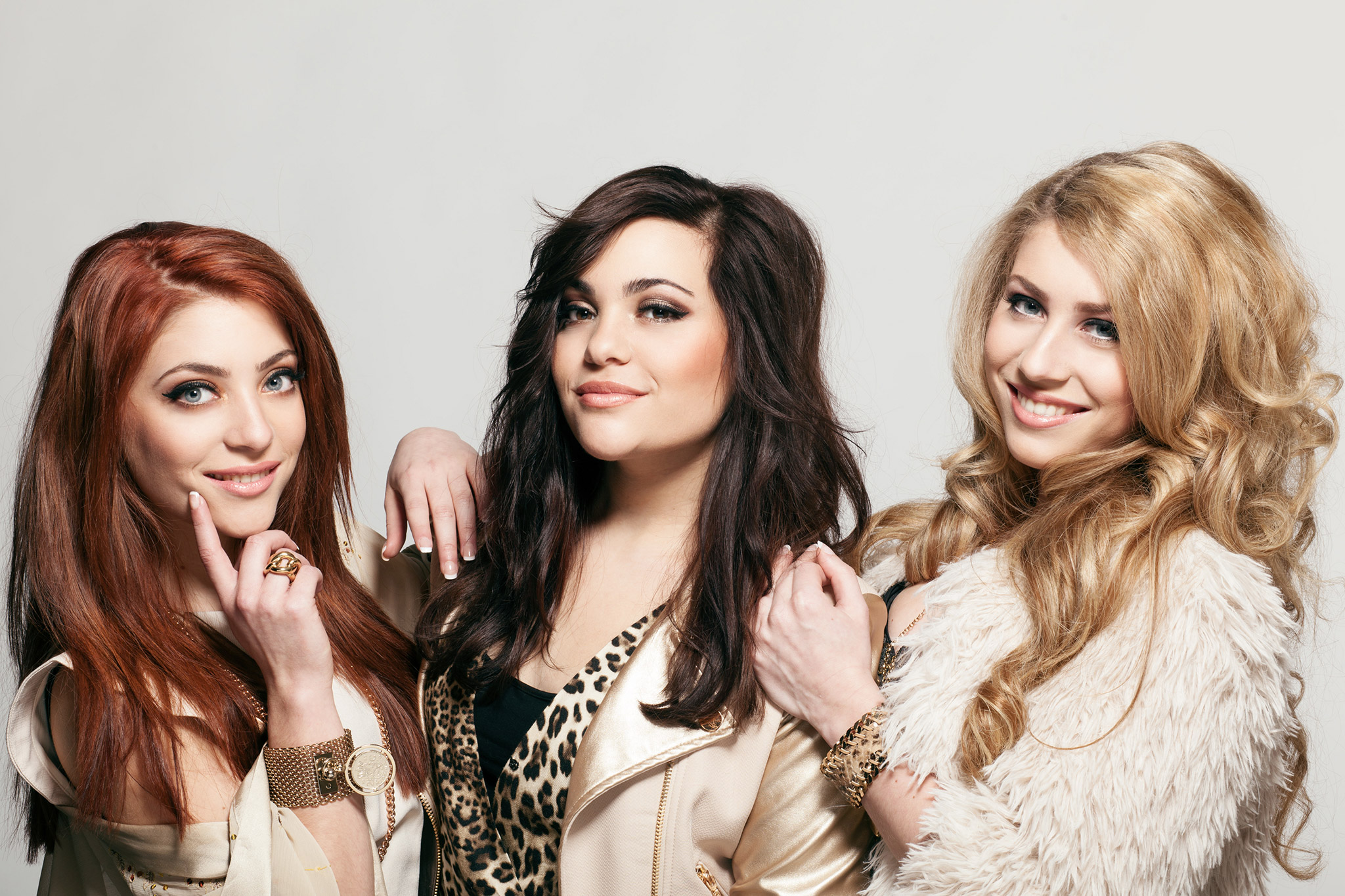
Og3ne

- Emanuel Sweert (1552 in Zevenbergen – 1612) a Dutch painter and nurseryman
- François Vranck (ca. 1555 in Zevenbergen – 1617) a Dutch lawyer and statesman, helped found the Dutch Republic
- Hendrick Berckman (1629 in Klundert – 1679) a Dutch Golden Age painter
- Jaap Burger (1904 in Willemstad – 1986) a Dutch politician
- Leo Riemens (1910 in Zevenbergen – 1985) a Dutch musicologist and cultural journalist
- Fons van der Stee (1928 in Zevenbergen – 1999) a Dutch politician
- Ad Bax (born 1956 in Zevenbergen) a Dutch-American molecular biophysicist
- Frans Bauer (born 1973 in Roosendaal) a Dutch singer of levenslied
- O'G3NE (formed 2007 in Fijnaart) a Dutch three-piece girl group

=== Sport ===
- Piet van der Horst (1903 in Klundert – 1983) a Dutch racing cyclist, silver medallist at the 1928 Summer Olympics
- Nico van Gageldonk (1913 in Klundert – 1995) a Dutch cyclist, competed at the 1936 Summer Olympics
- Angelique Seriese (born 1968 in Zevenbergen) a former Dutch judoka, gold medallist at the 1988 Summer Olympics

== Gallery ==
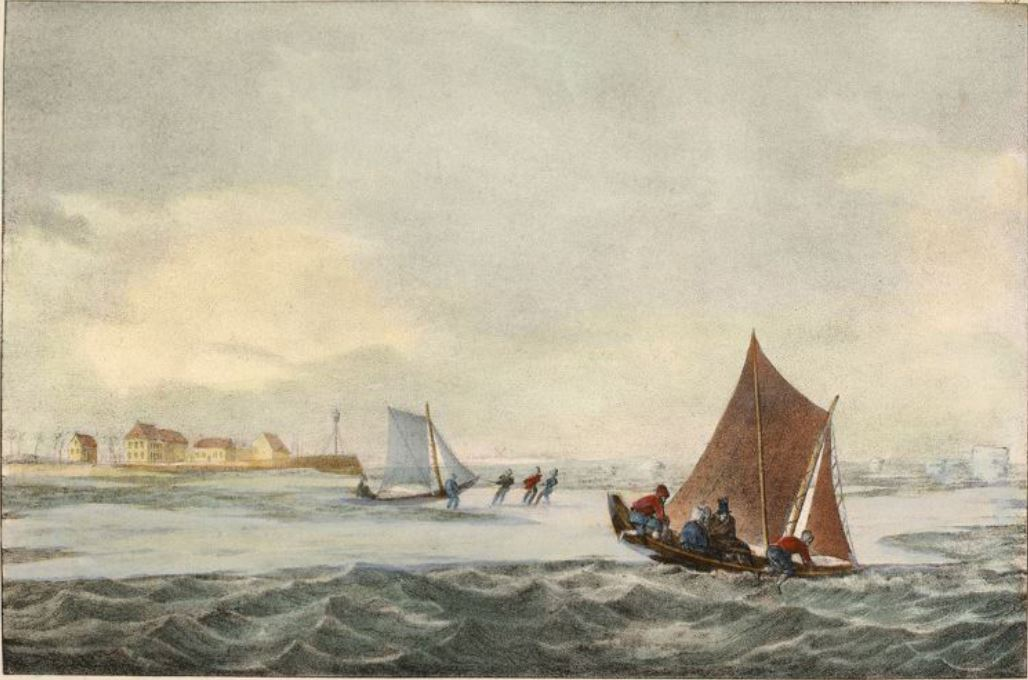
Vue de Willemsdorp, et du passage du Moerdyk

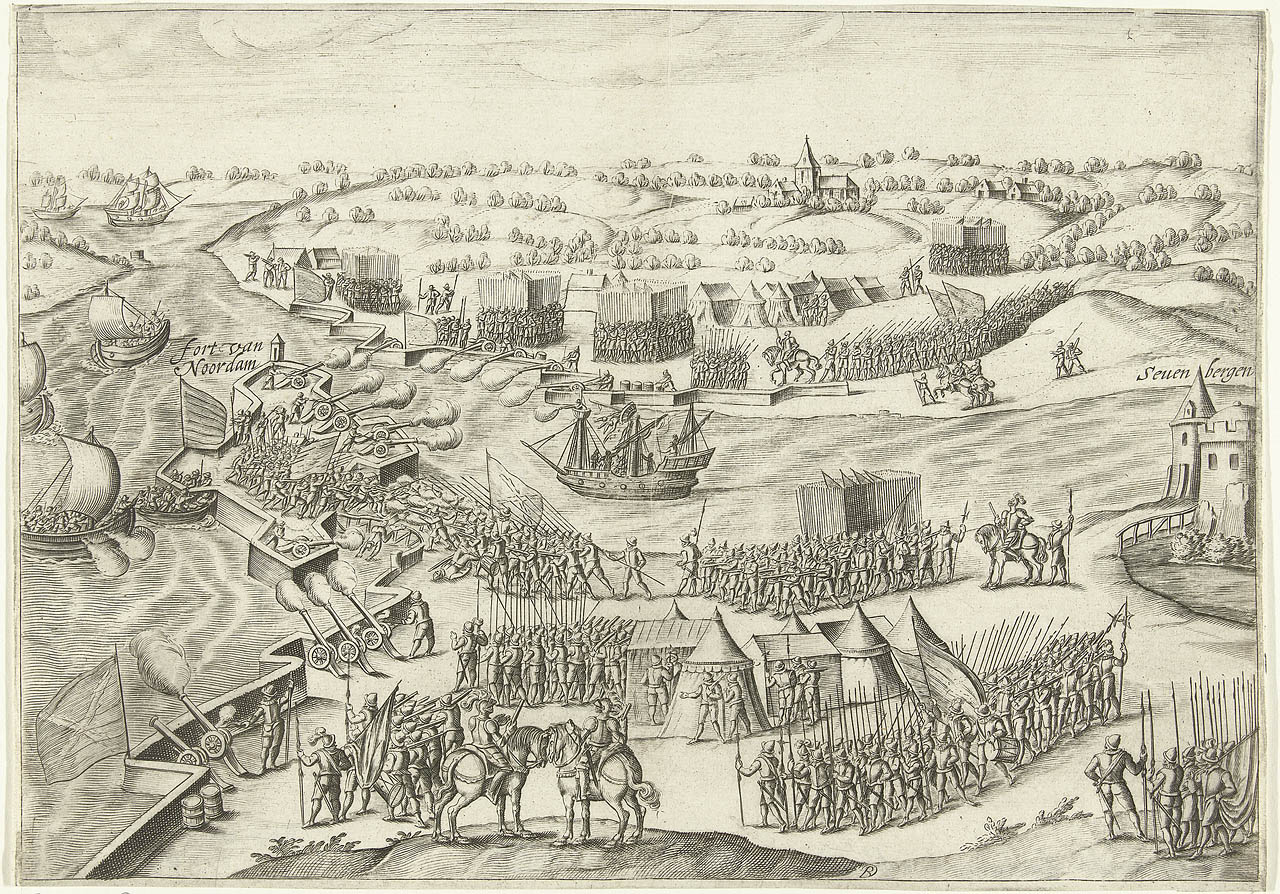
Defense of the Fort Noordam in 1590 against the Spanish army

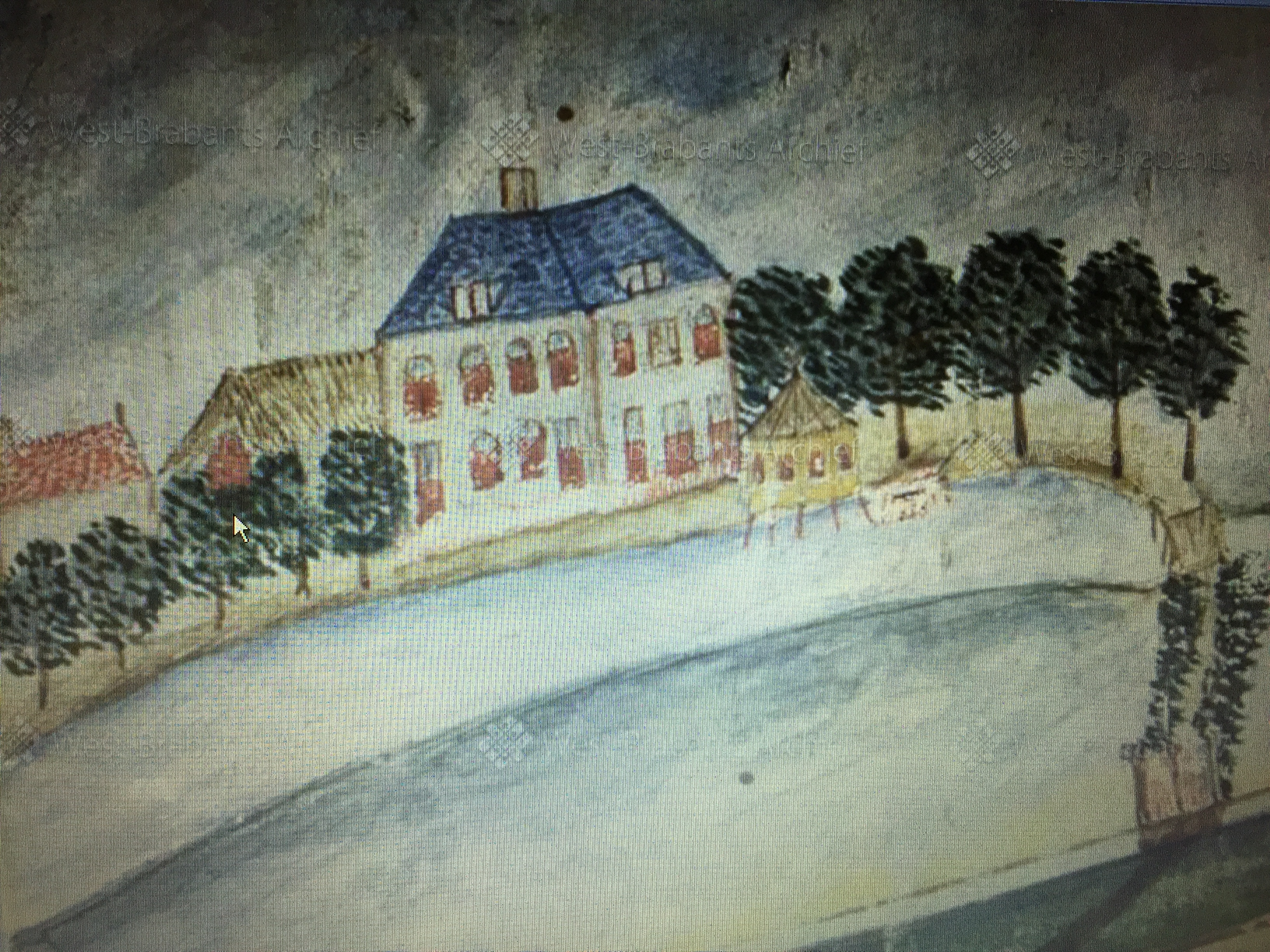
Landmeterskaart van de polder van West Heijningen, 1723
