= Willemstad (disambiguation) =

Willemstad (English: William Town) can refer to:

- Willemstad, the capital city of Curaçao, Kingdom of the Netherlands
- Willemstad, North Brabant, a town in Moerdijk, the Netherlands
- Willemstad, Groningen, a hamlet near Marum, the Netherlands
- Willemstad, Friesland, a hamlet in the Netherlands
- Willemstad (minesweeper)
