= Hendrick Berckman =

Dutch Golden Age painter

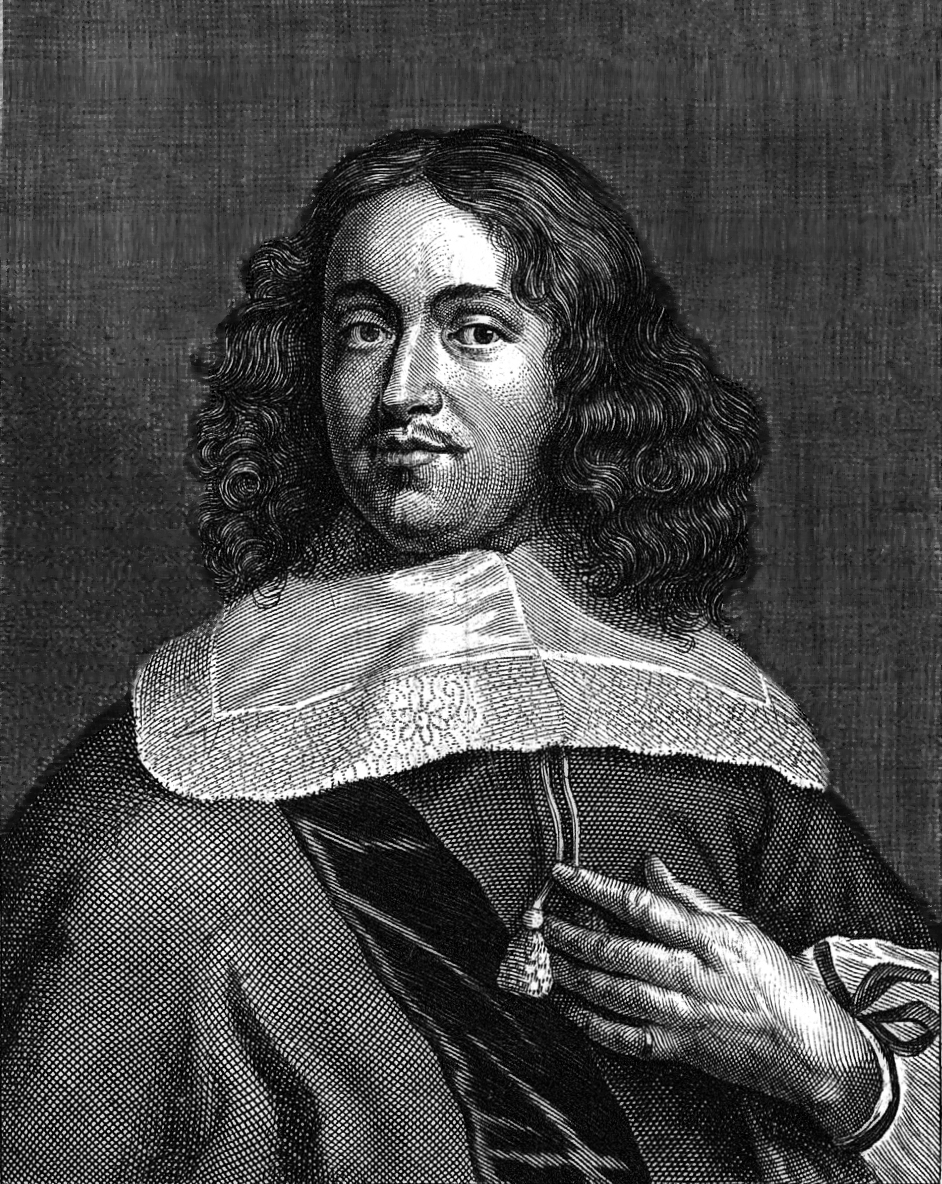
- Henry Berckmans in Het Gulden Cabinet
- Born: Hendrick; 1629; Klundert
- Died: 1679 (aged 49–50); Middelburg
- Known for: Painting
- Movement: Baroque

Hendrick Berckman (1629 – buried 27 March 1679) was a Dutch Golden Age painter.

== Biography ==
He was a pupil of Thomas Willeboirts Bosschaert and Jacob Jordaens in Antwerp, and spent some time in Haarlem studying with Philip Wouwermans. He is registered in Leiden from 1652 to 1654, and in 1655 he settled in Middleburg. Though he trained as a landscape painter, he is most known today for his portraits of respected members of the elite.

According to Houbraken, he was a promising young painter of "batalje" or small-scale battle-pieces, who was advised by Jacob Jordaens to try making large paintings, which he did.

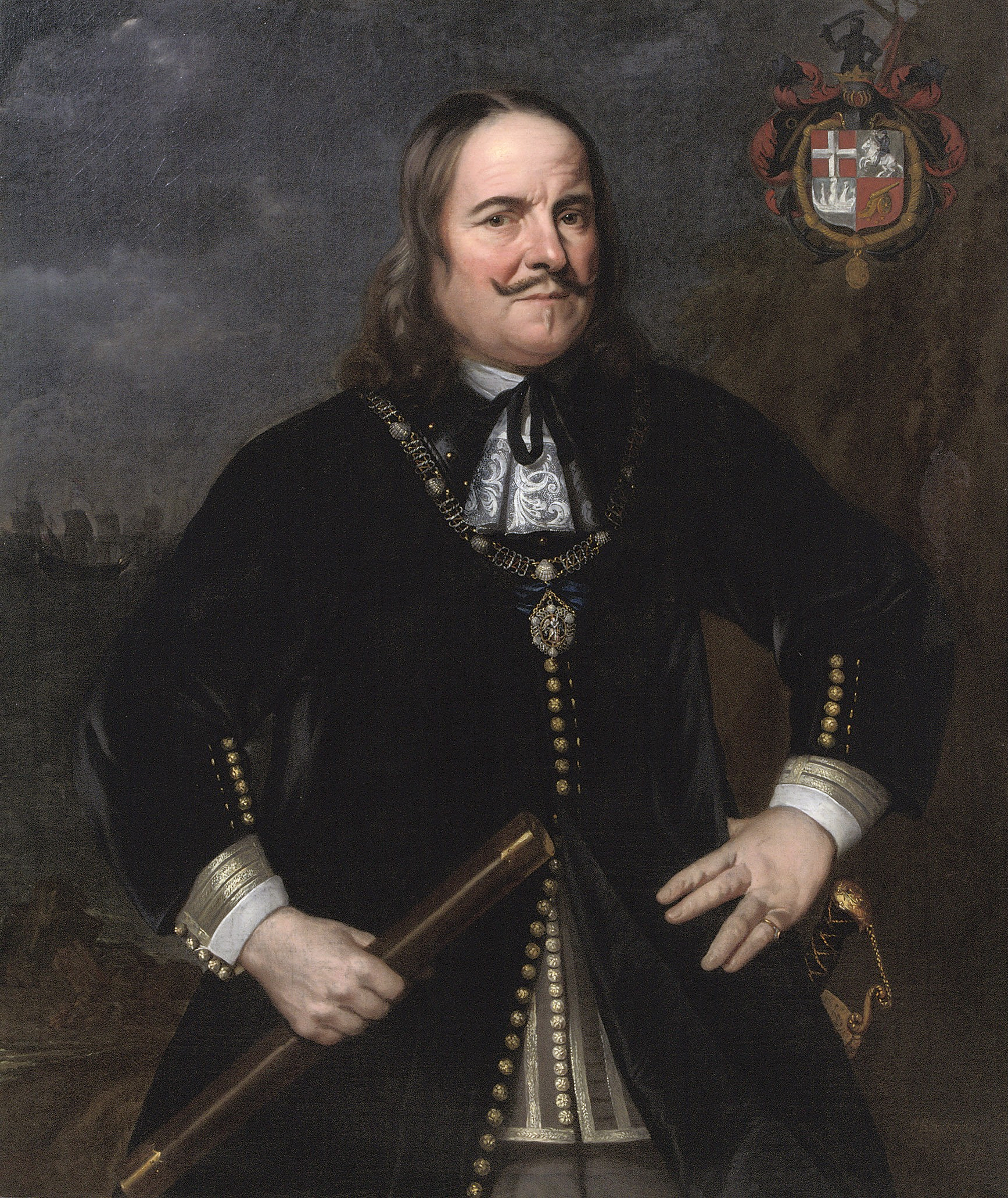
Wedding portrait of Michiel de Ruyter, painted in 1668.

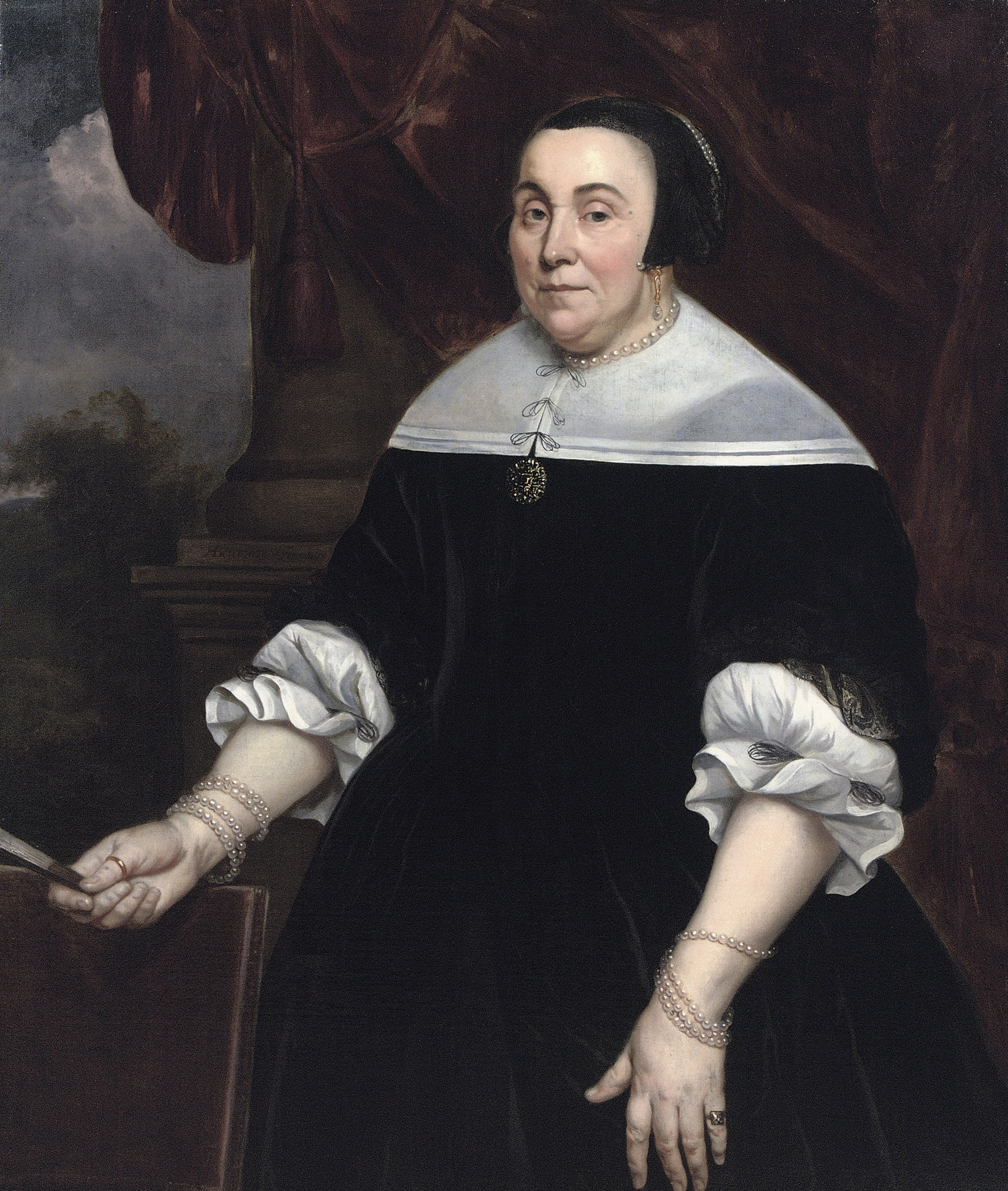
Pendant Wedding portrait of Anna van Gelder, wife of De Ruyter, 1668.
