= Fijnaart =

- Town
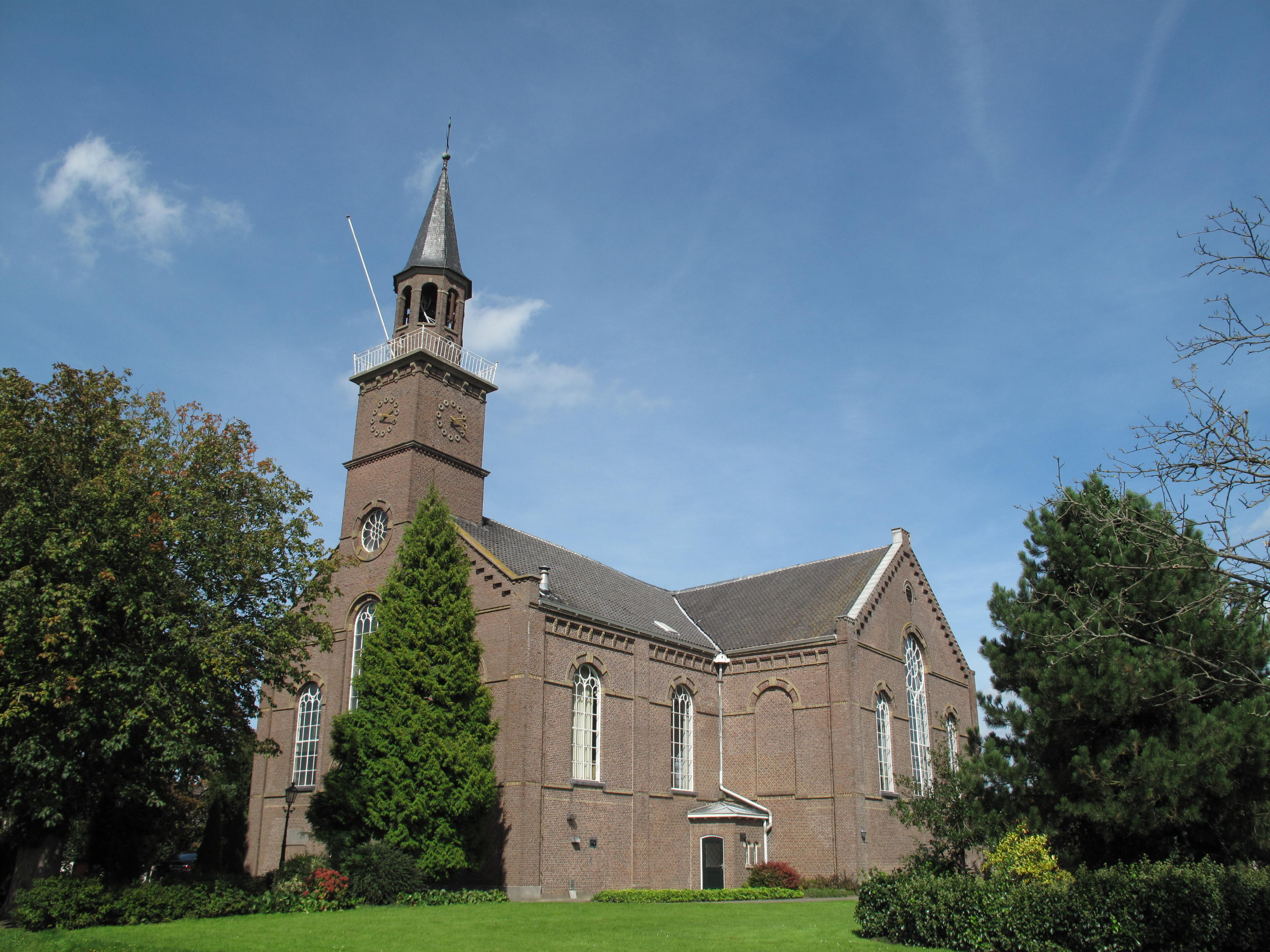
- Church of Fijnaart

- Location in the province of North Brabant in the Netherlands Fijnaart (Netherlands)
- Coordinates: 51°38′15″N 4°28′12″E
- Country: Netherlands
- Province: North Brabant
- Municipality: Moerdijk

Area
  - Total: 23.67 km^{2} (9.14 sq mi)
- Elevation: 0.6 m (2.0 ft)

Population (2021)
  - Total: 5,620
  - Density: 237/km^{2} (615/sq mi)
- Time zone: UTC+1 (CET)
  - Summer (DST): UTC+2 (CEST)
- Postal code: 4793
- Dialing code: 0168

Fijnaart is a town in the Dutch province of North Brabant. It is located in the municipality of Moerdijk, about 8 km west of the town of Zevenbergen.

== History ==
The village was first mentioned in 1380 as "die fiinre". The etymology is unclear. The area around Fijnaart was diked around 1380, but lost in the St. Elizabeth's flood of 1421. A new dike was built in the 16th century. Fijnaart developed in the mid-16th century. The Voorstraat was the wide main street and was placed at right angles from the dike. The church was built at the end of the Voorstraat.

The Dutch Reformed church is a T-shaped building. The tower was added in 1875. The Catholic Jacobuskerk dates from 1925. It was destroyed by war in October 1944 and rebuilt in 1953.

Fort Sabina Henrica was built in 1811 by the French after the English tried to invade Walcheren in 1809. It was part of two opposing forts, and named Duquesne after Abraham Duquesne. In 1813, after the French defeat, it was renamed Fort Prins Frederik. In 1913, it received its current name. The fort was enlarged and modified between 1880 and 1883. In 1924, it was decommissioned because it had become obsolete. During the 1950s and 1960s, it was used as an ammunition depot. It was bought by the municipality in 1977.

Fijnaart was home to 570 people in 1840. The village used to part of the municipality of Fijnaart en Heijningen. In 1996, it was merged into Moerdijk.

== Notable people ==
- O'G3NE, the sisters Lisa, Amy and Shelley Vol, who won The Voice of Holland and represented Netherlands at the Eurovision Song Contest 2017 with "Lights And Shadows".
- Frans Bauer, singer/songwriter of folk music

== Gallery ==
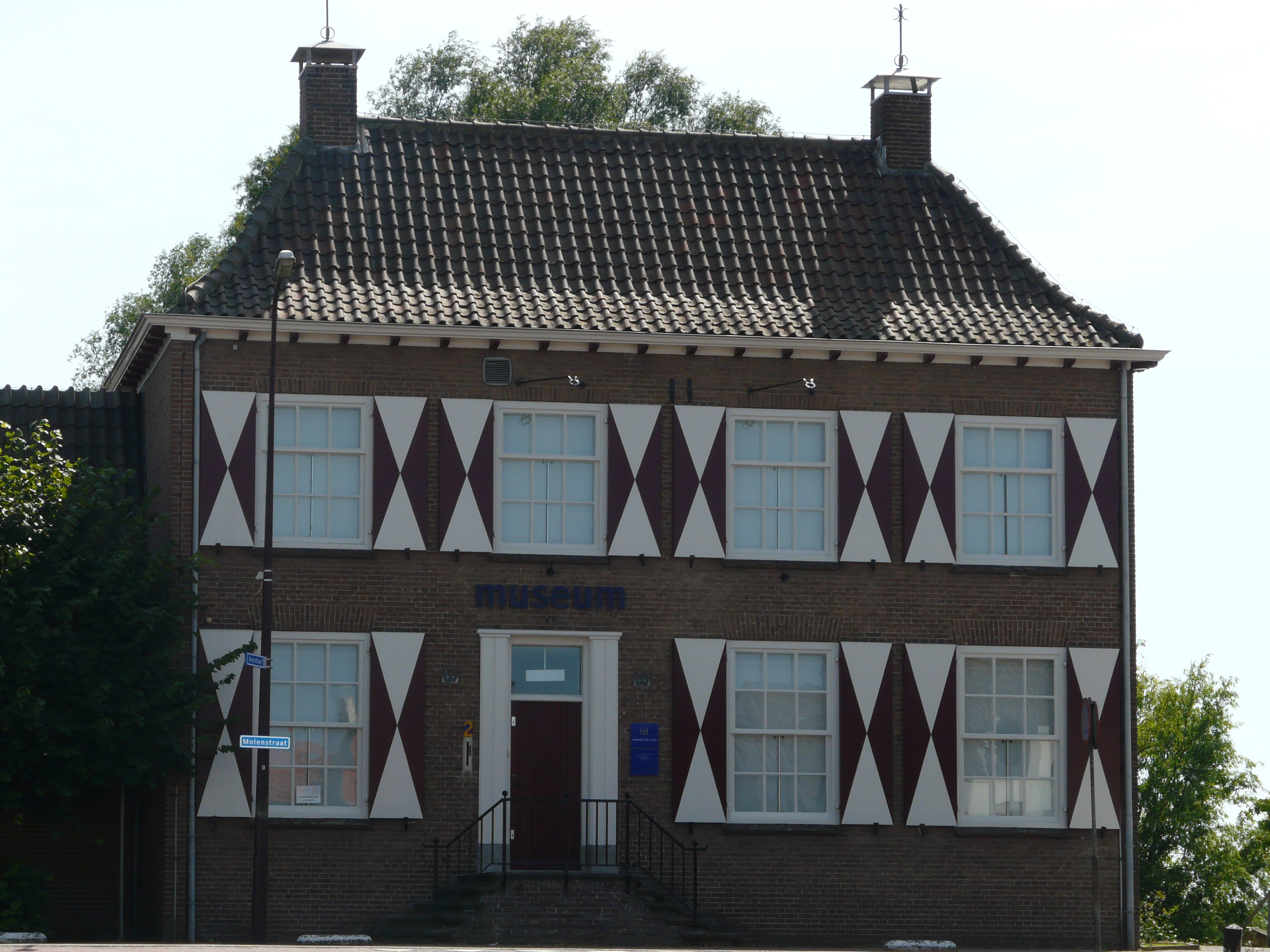
Former museum

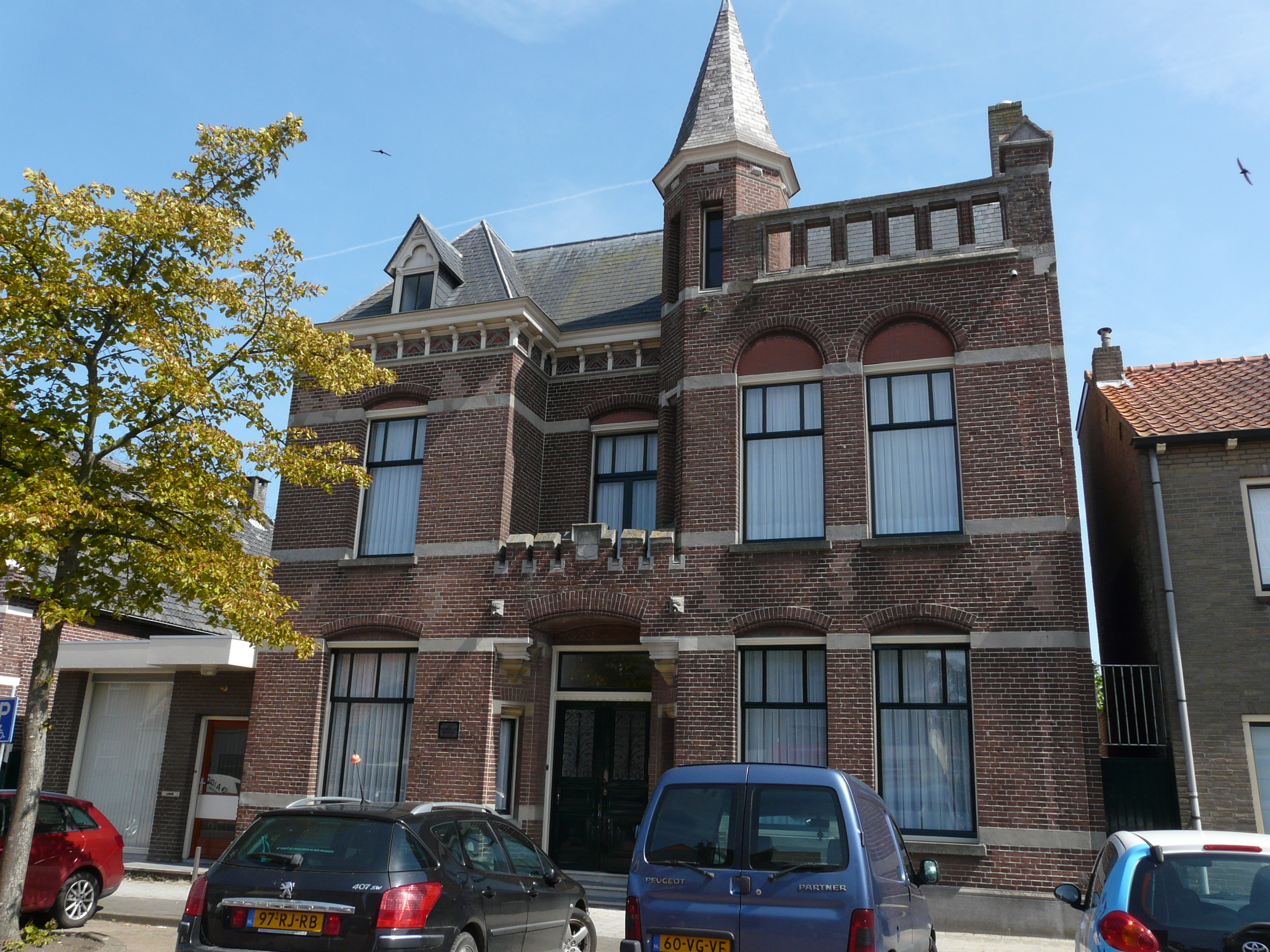
Building in Fijnaart

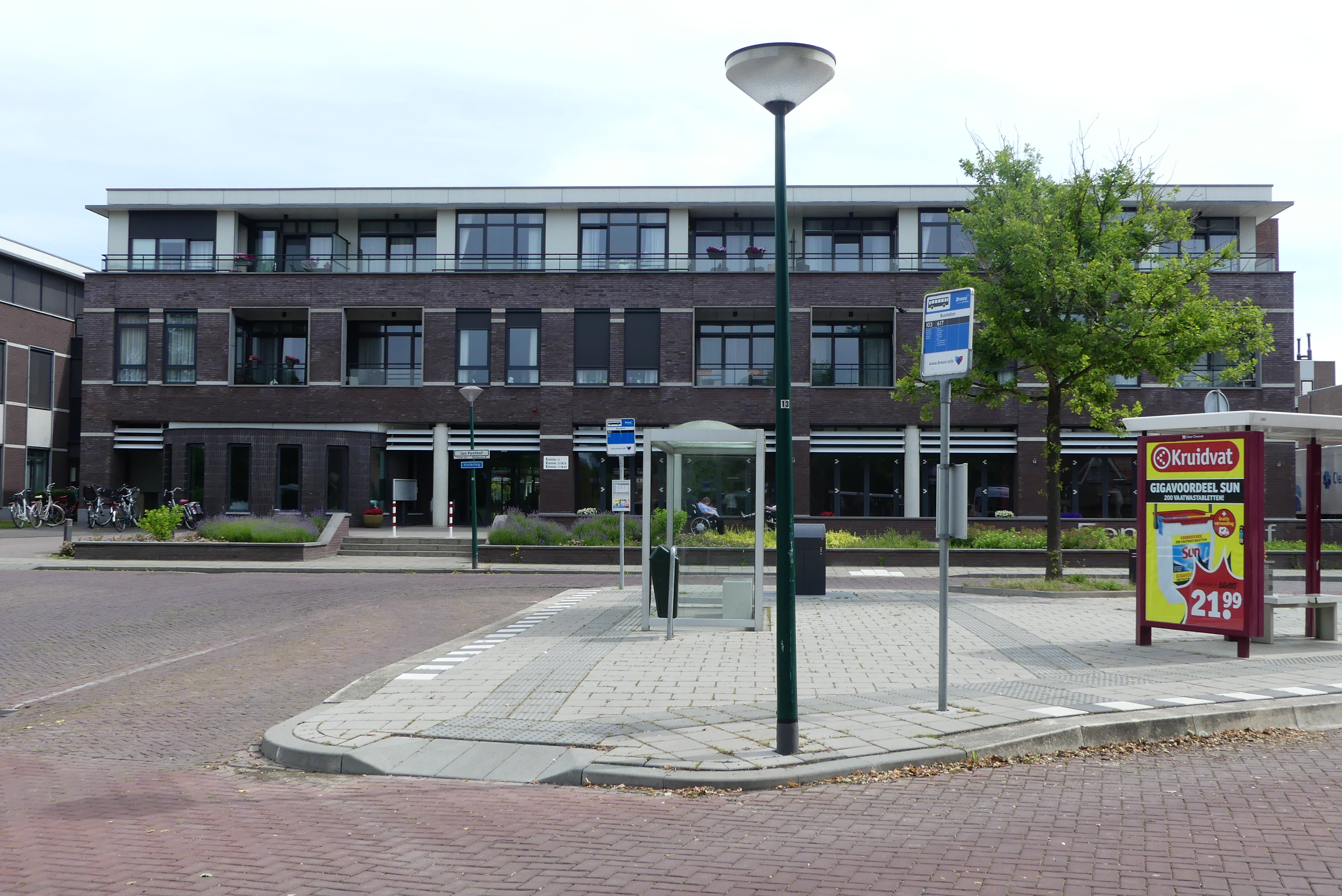
Apartment buildings

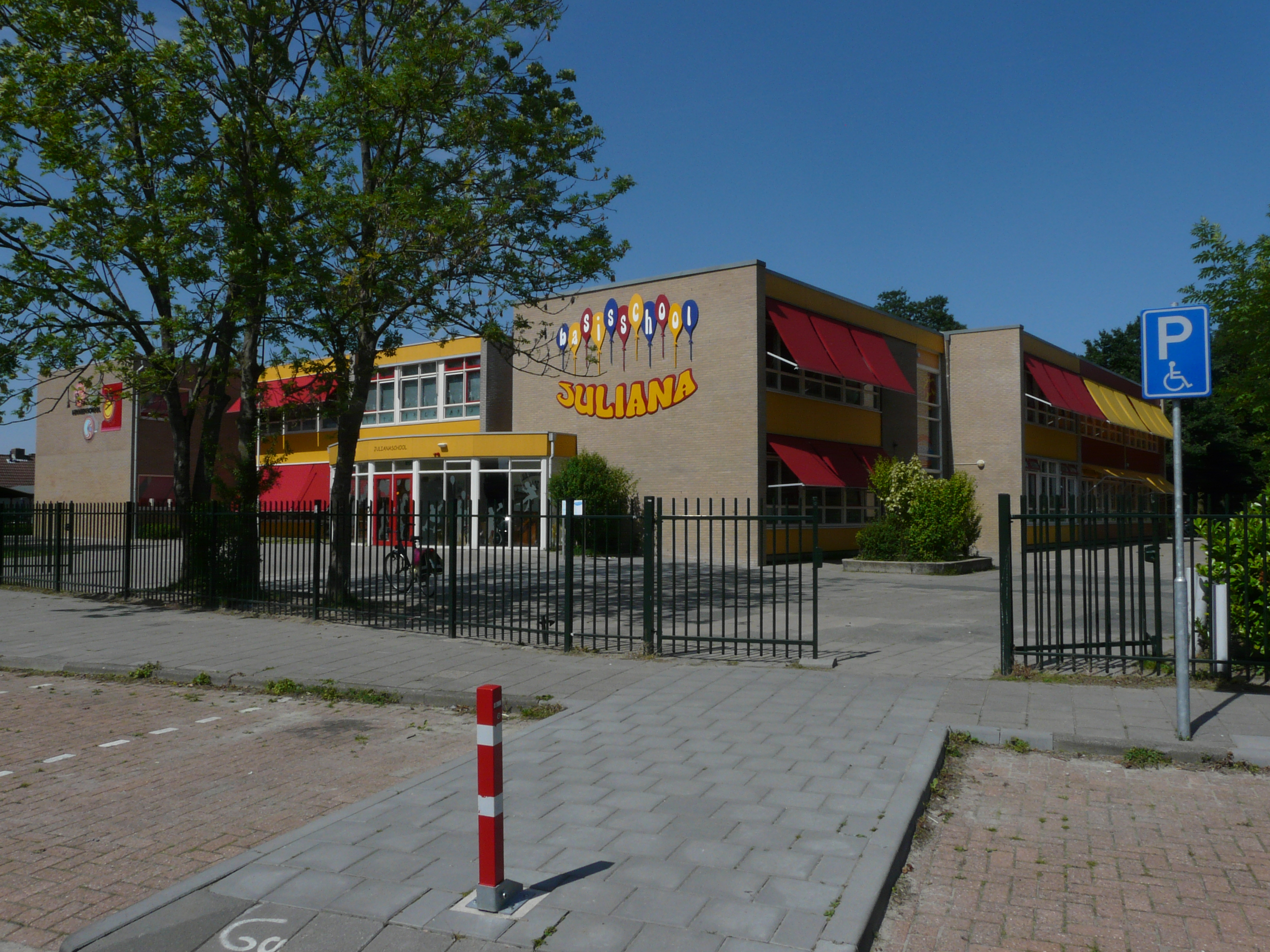
School
