= Noordhoek, Moerdijk =

Noordhoek
- Village
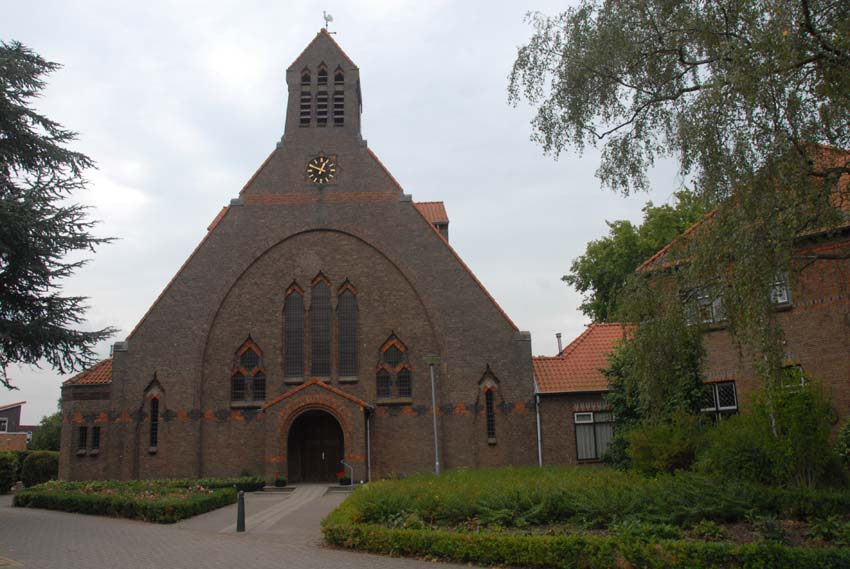
- St Josef Church

- Location in the province of North Brabant in the Netherlands Noordhoek (Netherlands)
- Coordinates: 51°38′32″N 4°31′49″E
- Country: Netherlands
- Province: North Brabant
- Municipality: Moerdijk

Area
  - Total: 4.07 km^{2} (1.57 sq mi)
- Elevation: 1.1 m (3.6 ft)

Population (2021)
  - Total: 1,100
  - Density: 270/km^{2} (700/sq mi)
- Time zone: UTC+1 (CET)
  - Summer (DST): UTC+2 (CEST)
- Postal code: 4759
- Dialing code: 0168

Noordhoek is a village in the Dutch province of North Brabant. It is located in the municipality of Moerdijk, about 5 km west of Zevenbergen.

== History ==
The village was first mentioned between 1838 and 1857 as Noordhoek, and means "northern corner" and refers to the north-eastern part of the Oudland van Standdaarbuiten polder. The dike around the polder was built in 1548. In 1921, the Catholic St Josef Church was built in Expressionist style. The church was designed by Paul Bellot. The church has a matching clergy house in the same style.

Noordhoek was home to 266 people in 1840. In 1944, the village was heavily damaged during four days of fighting between the German and Allied armies. Noordhoek used to be split in two municipality. It 1996, it became part of the municipality of Moerdijk.
