= Standdaarbuiten =

- Village
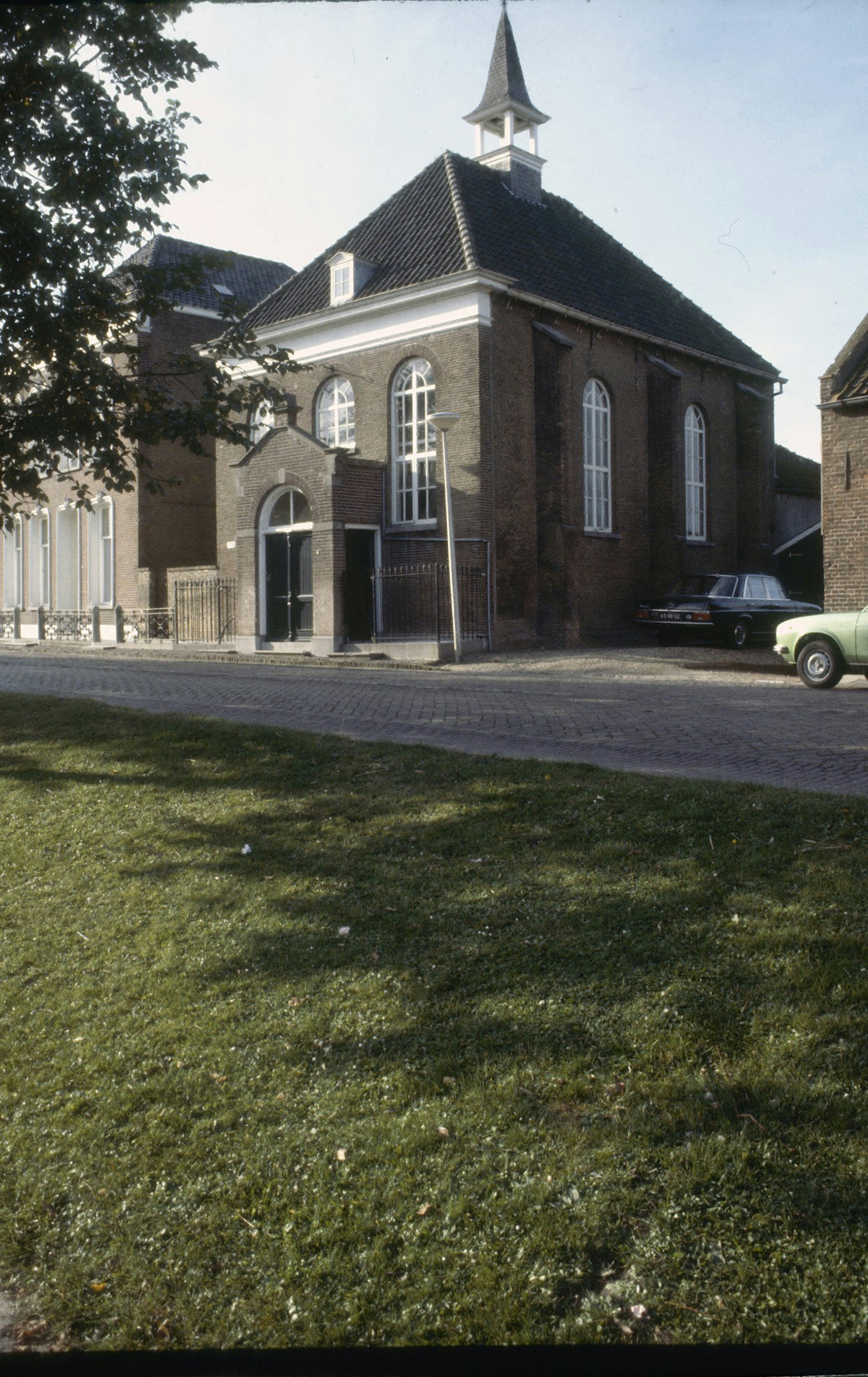
- Dutch Reformed church

- Flag Coat of arms

- Location in the province of North Brabant in the Netherlands Standdaarbuiten (Netherlands)
- Coordinates: 51°36′44″N 4°30′52″E
- Country: Netherlands
- Province: North Brabant
- Municipality: Moerdijk

Area
  - Total: 9.82 km^{2} (3.79 sq mi)
- Elevation: 1.5 m (4.9 ft)

Population (2021)
  - Total: 2,230
  - Density: 227/km^{2} (588/sq mi)
- Time zone: UTC+1 (CET)
  - Summer (DST): UTC+2 (CEST)
- Postal code: 4758
- Dialing code: 0165

Standdaarbuiten is a village in the Dutch province of North Brabant located in the municipality of Moerdijk, about 9 km northeast of Roosendaal.

== History ==
The village was first mentioned in 1461 as "tgors Standerbuyten", and means "beyond the border pole", however it has later often been corrupted to "sandt daar buiten" (sand on the outside). Standdaarbuiten developed in the 16th century.

The Dutch Reformed church is a neoclassic aisleless church built in 1808 and similar to the church in Moerdijk. The Catholic St John the Baptist church was built in 1925 to replace the village church from 1548. It used to have a 58 metres (190 ft) tall tower, but it was damaged during World War II and shortened after the war.

Standaarbuiten was home to 304 people in 1840. It was a separate municipality until 1997 when it became part of Moerdijk.

In the late half of World War II the town would the centre of a major river crossing across the Mark River by the 104th Infantry Division in support of Operation Pheasant between the 31 October and the 3 November, 1944. Elements of the German 2nd Battalion of Grenadier Regiment 857 of the 346th Infantry Division with armored support in the form of Sturmgeschütz IIIs from Sturmgeschütz Brigade 244 managed to stop the first major crossing on the 31st by the 2nd Battalion of the 415th Infantry Regiment and result in a 3 Prone attack by the 1st and 3rd Battalions (plus the 2nd Battalion of the 413th Infantry Regiment) to secure the village and establish a bridgehead over the Mark. (Cecil H. Bolton would also earn his Medal of Honor serving with the 104th Infantry Division at Standaarbuiten).

== Gallery ==
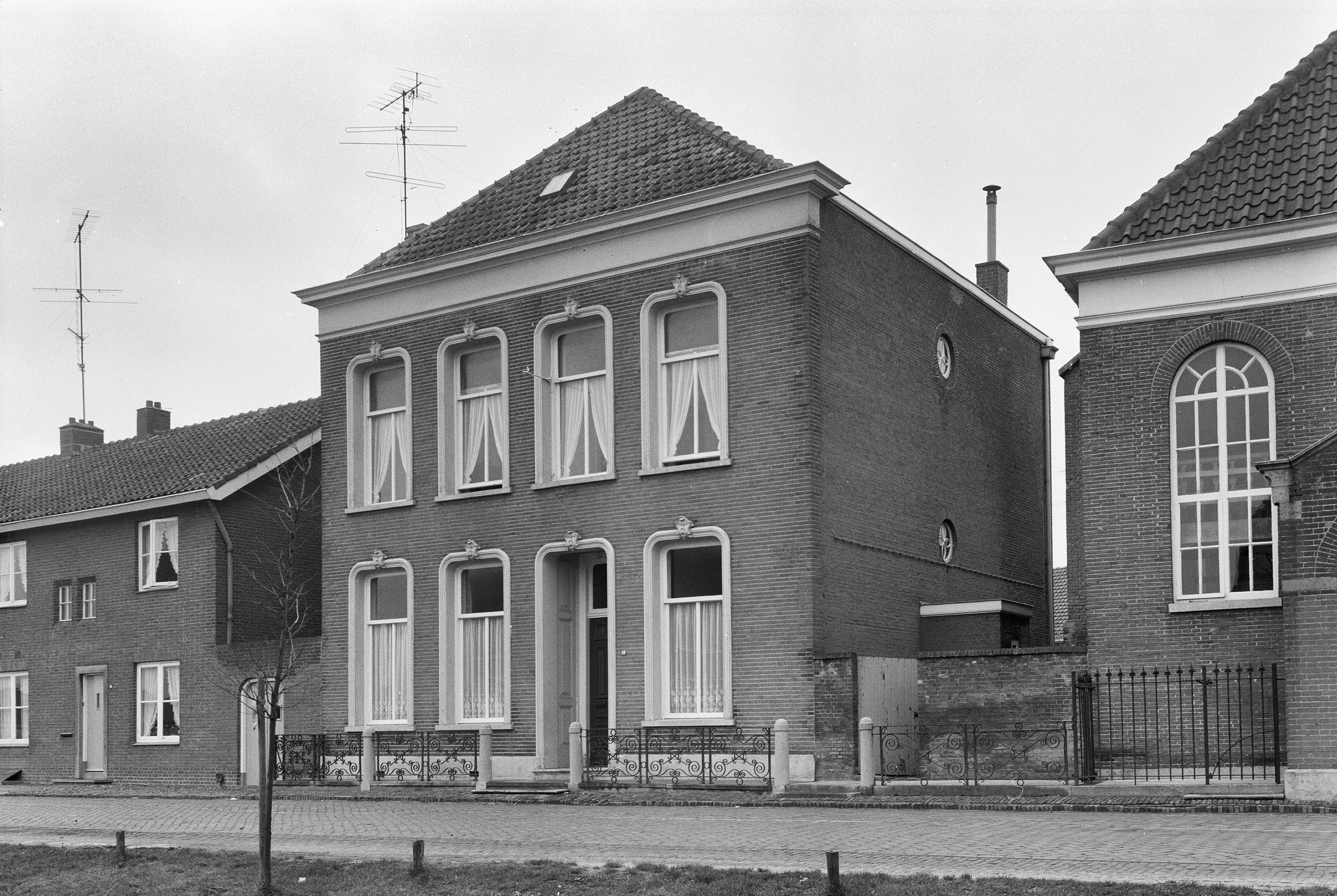
House in Standaardbuiten (1967)

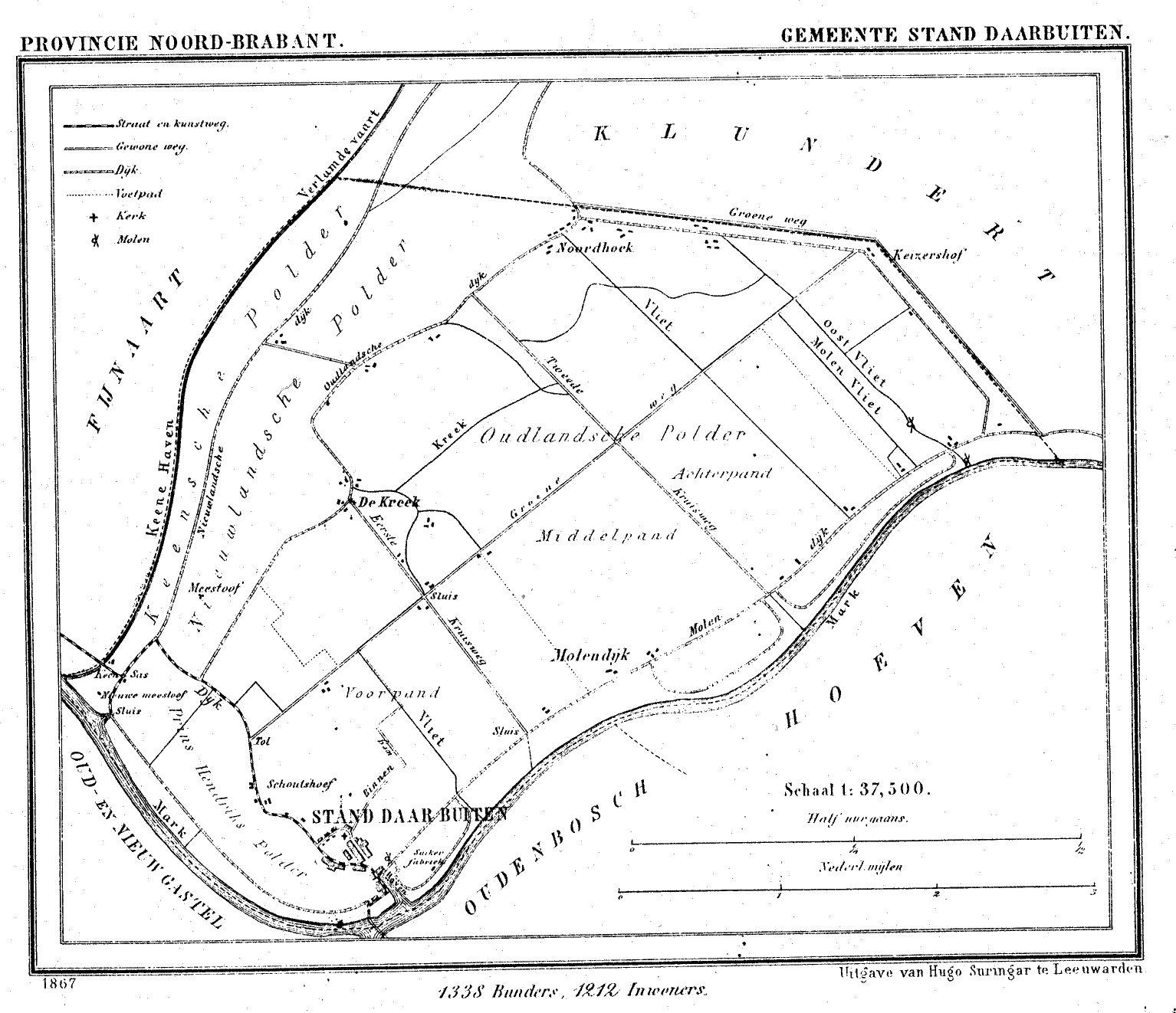
1867 map
