= Fijnaart en Heijningen =

Coordinates: 51.63805°N 4.470406°E

Coat of Arms

Fijnaart en Heijningen is a former municipality in the Dutch province of North Brabant. It covered the villages of Fijnaart and Heijningen.

Fijnaart en Heijningen was a separate municipality until 1997, when it was merged with Zevenbergen.
