= Moerdijk bridges =

Bridges in the Netherlands

Coordinates: 51°43′N 4°38′E

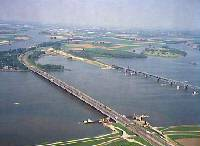
Moerdijk bridges in 2001

The Moerdijk bridges in the Netherlands are bridges that connect the Island of Dordrecht with the Dutch province of North Brabant (Noord-Brabant) across the Hollands Diep. The first bridge was built at the end of the 19th century, and was a railway bridge. The second bridge was built in the 1930s for road traffic, and is currently part of the A16 motorway. This bridge was replaced in 1978 by a more modern, wider bridge. A second railroad bridge was finished in 2006, as part of the HSL-Zuid project.

At the beginning of the Battle of Holland, on 10 May 1940, bridges were captured during a paratroopers operation and held for 4 days until German forward forces arrived. In 1944, both the road and railway bridge were destroyed by the Germans to prevent the Allied Forces from reaching the province South Holland.
