= Willemstad, North Brabant =

Willemstad
- City
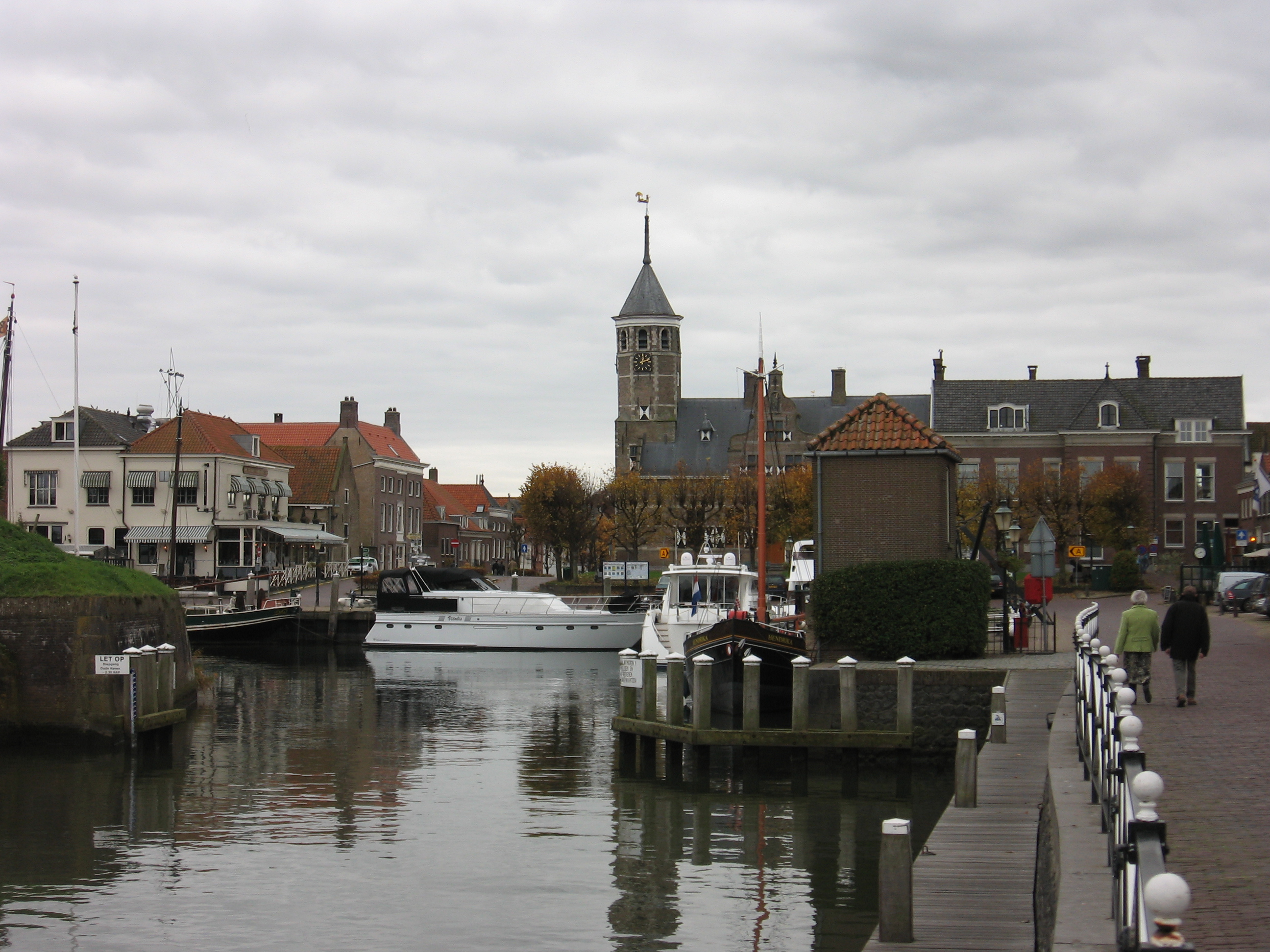
- The port of Willemstad with the tower of the former city hall in the back

- Flag Coat of arms

- Location in the province of North Brabant in the Netherlands Willemstad (Netherlands)
- Coordinates: 51°41′31″N 4°26′16″E
- Country: Netherlands
- Province: North Brabant
- Municipality: Moerdijk

Area
  - Total: 16.70 km^{2} (6.45 sq mi)
- Elevation: 0.9 m (3.0 ft)

Population (2021)
  - Total: 2,490
  - Density: 149/km^{2} (386/sq mi)
- Time zone: UTC+1 (CET)
  - Summer (DST): UTC+2 (CEST)
- Postal code: 4797
- Dialing code: 0168

Willemstad is a city in the Dutch province of North Brabant. It is located in the municipality of Moerdijk. Its population as of 2021 was 2,490.

Willemstad is a small historical town with well preserved fortifications. It lies on the Hollands Diep, close to the Haringvliet and Volkerak. It received city rights in 1585. The Reformed Church was built in 1607 as the first new Protestant church building in the Netherlands (see: the Reformation and its influence on church architecture).

== History ==
The current name was first used in 1639 as Willemstat, and refers to William the Silent who fortified the settlement in 1583. The settlement used to be known as Ruigenhil, and was located at a strategic location along the Hollands Diep. In 1587, the fortifications were completed, and Willemstad received a heptagon (seven sided) shape with seven bastions. Even though the fortification have been decommissioned in 1926, the layout is still clearly visible and mainly intact.

The Dutch Reformed church was built between 1597 and 1607 and has an octagon shape with a dome with ridge turret on top. There is an incomplete tower in the south-western corner. The church was severely damaged by war in 1944. It was nearly completely restored in 1950 when it was devastated by fire.

The Gouvernementshuis was built between 1623 and 1625 for Maurice, Prince of Orange. After his death in 1625, it was used as the residence of the governor of Willemstad until 1795. It was extensively restored between 1968 and 1973, and served as town hall until 1996.

Willemstad was home to 1,154 people in 1840. In 1970, the entire centre was declared a protected site. Willemstad was a separate municipality until 1997, when it became part of Zevenbergen, which changed its name to Moerdijk in 1998.

== Gallery ==
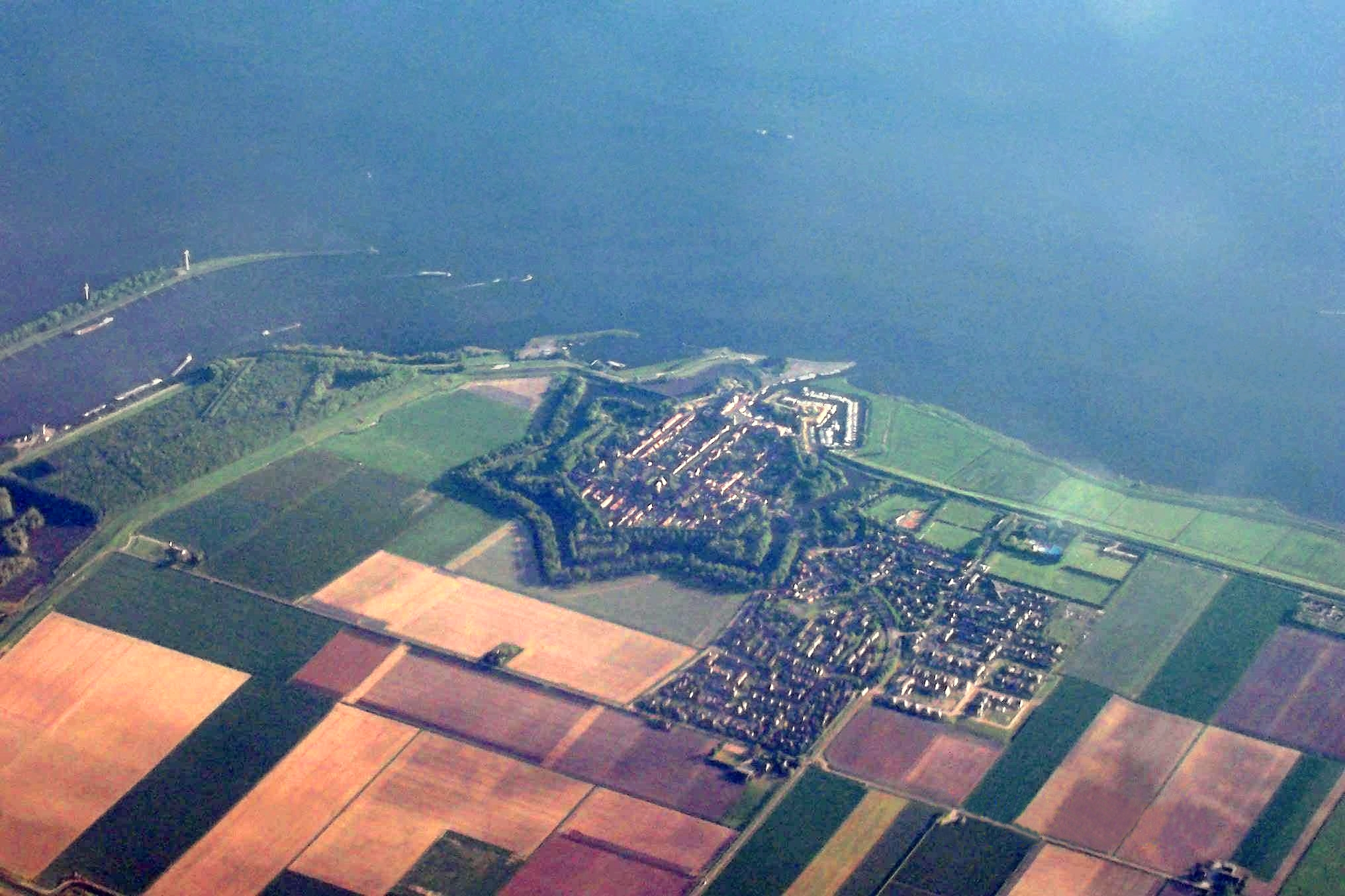
Willemstad seen from the air, the fortifications are clearly visible

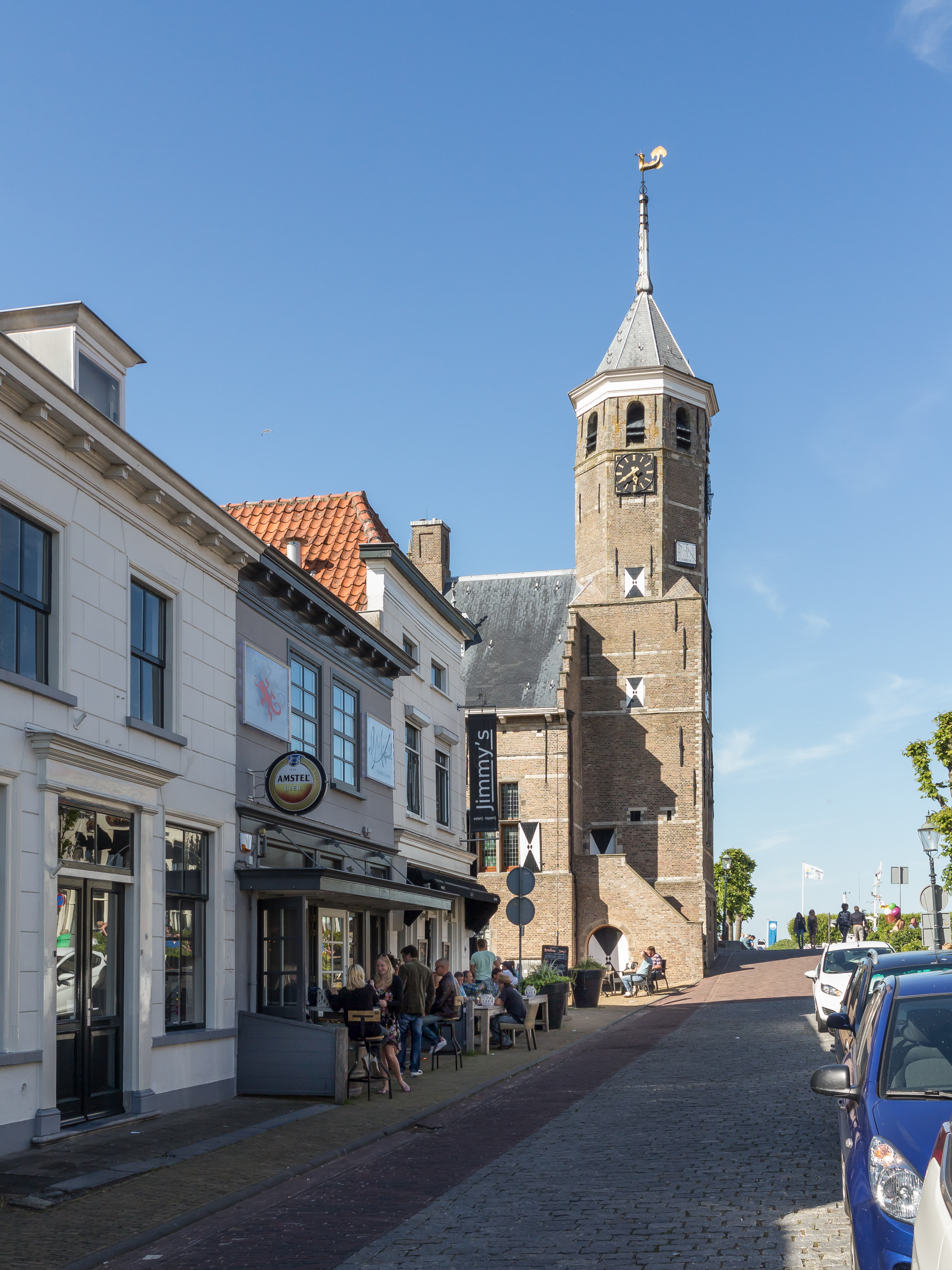
Willemstad former townhall

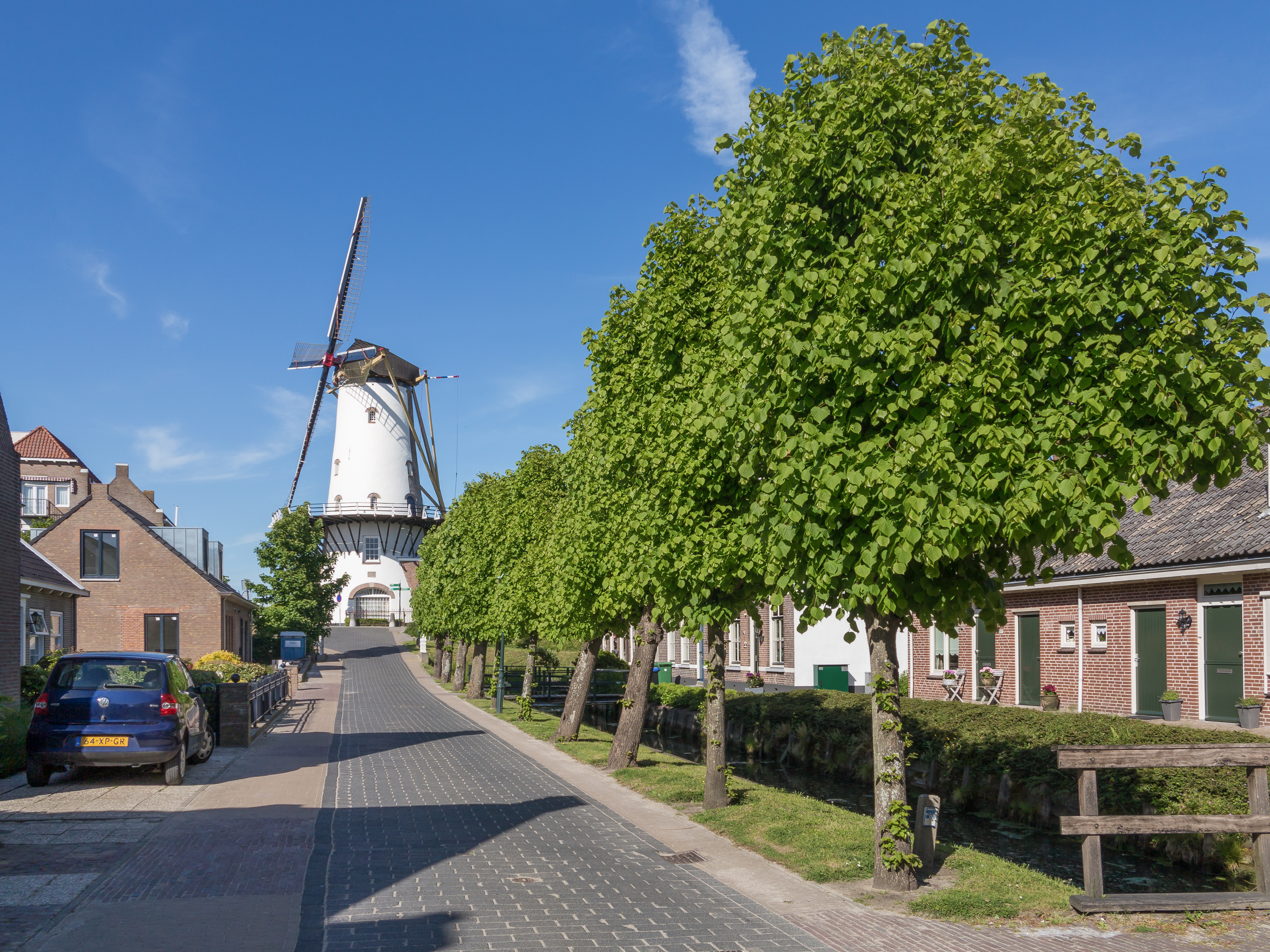
Willemstad, windmill (d´Orangemolen)

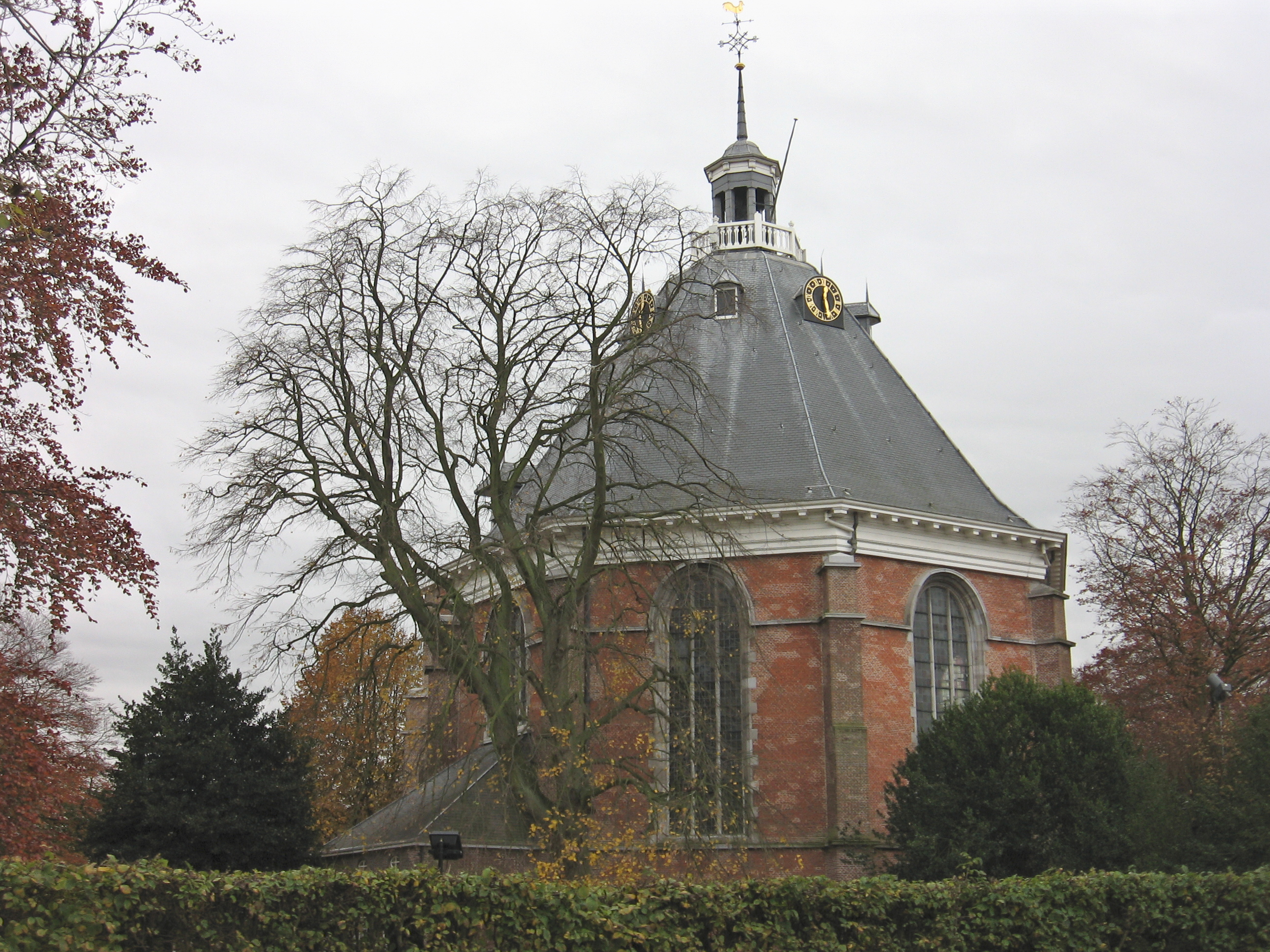
Reformed Church
