= Klundert =

- City
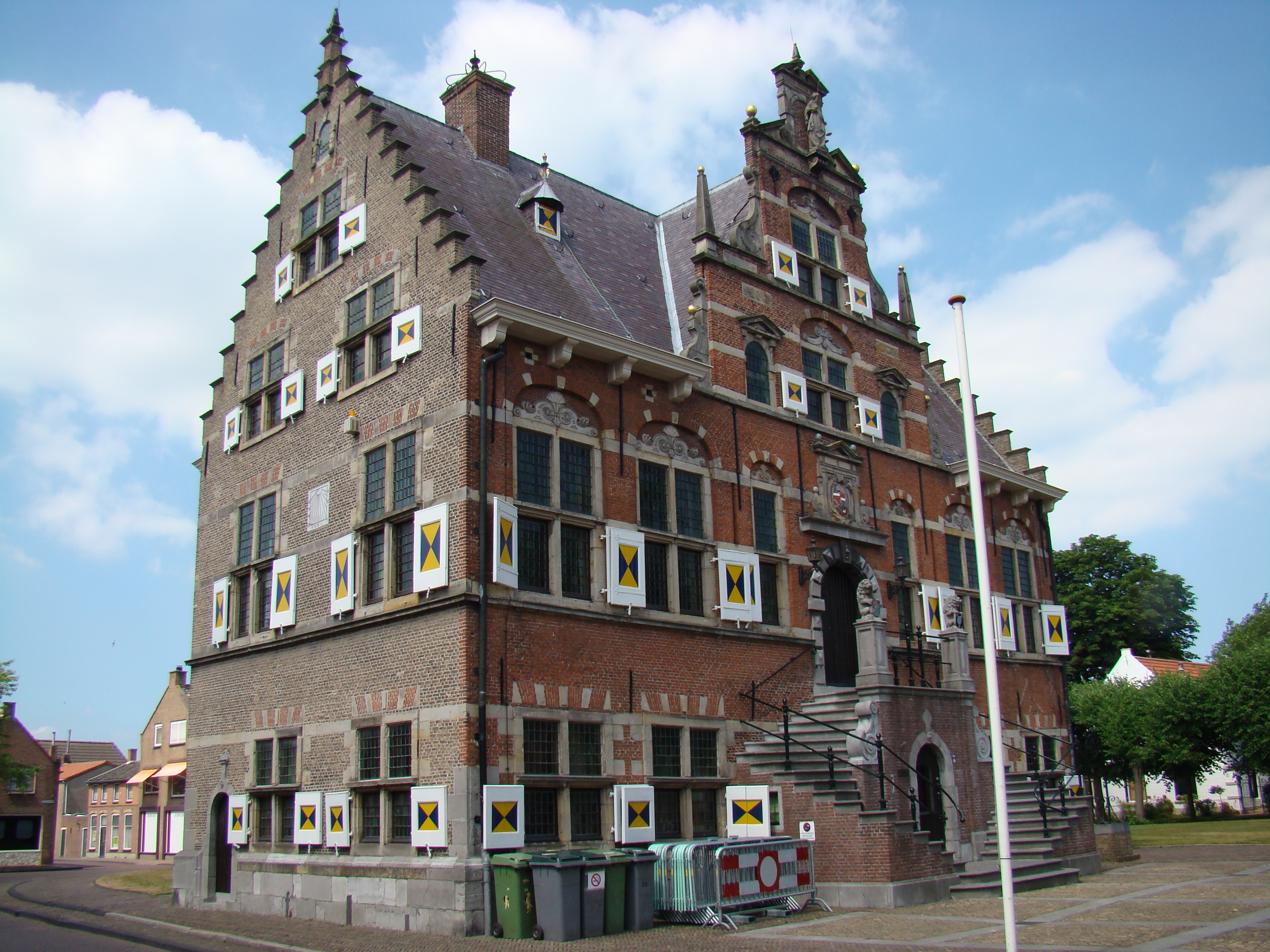
- Former town hall of Klundert

- Flag Coat of arms

- Location in the province of North Brabant in the Netherlands Klundert (Netherlands)
- Coordinates: 51°39′46″N 4°31′44″E
- Country: Netherlands
- Province: North Brabant
- Municipality: Moerdijk

Area
  - Total: 36.13 km^{2} (13.95 sq mi)
- Elevation: 2.2 m (7.2 ft)

Population (2021)
  - Total: 5,885
  - Density: 162.9/km^{2} (421.9/sq mi)
- Time zone: UTC+1 (CET)
  - Summer (DST): UTC+2 (CEST)
- Postal code: 4790-4791
- Dialing code: 0168

Klundert is a city in the Dutch province of North Brabant. It is located close to the Hollands Diep, about 3 km northwest of Zevenbergen. It received city rights in 1357.

== History ==
The current name was first mentioned in 1537 as "die clunder", and means piece of clay. The settlement started around 1250 as Die Overdraghe. In 1357, it received city rights as the capital of the heerlijkheid Niervaert. The city was destroyed in 1421 by the St. Elizabeth's flood. A new settlement appeared around 1558. Klundert was fortified in 1581.

In 1793, Klundert was conquered by the French. Klundert was home to 1,180 people in 1840. The city was severely damaged during World War II. The Catholic St John, the Baptist church was built between 1889 and 1890. It was damaged in 1944, and during the restoration of 1946/1947, it was decided not to rebuild the tower. The Dutch Reformed church was built in 1952 to replace the medieval church which was destroyed in 1944.

During the North Sea flood of 1953, 90% of the buildings were under water, and 17 citizens died. Klundert was a separate municipality until 1997, when it became a part of Moerdijk.

== Gallery ==
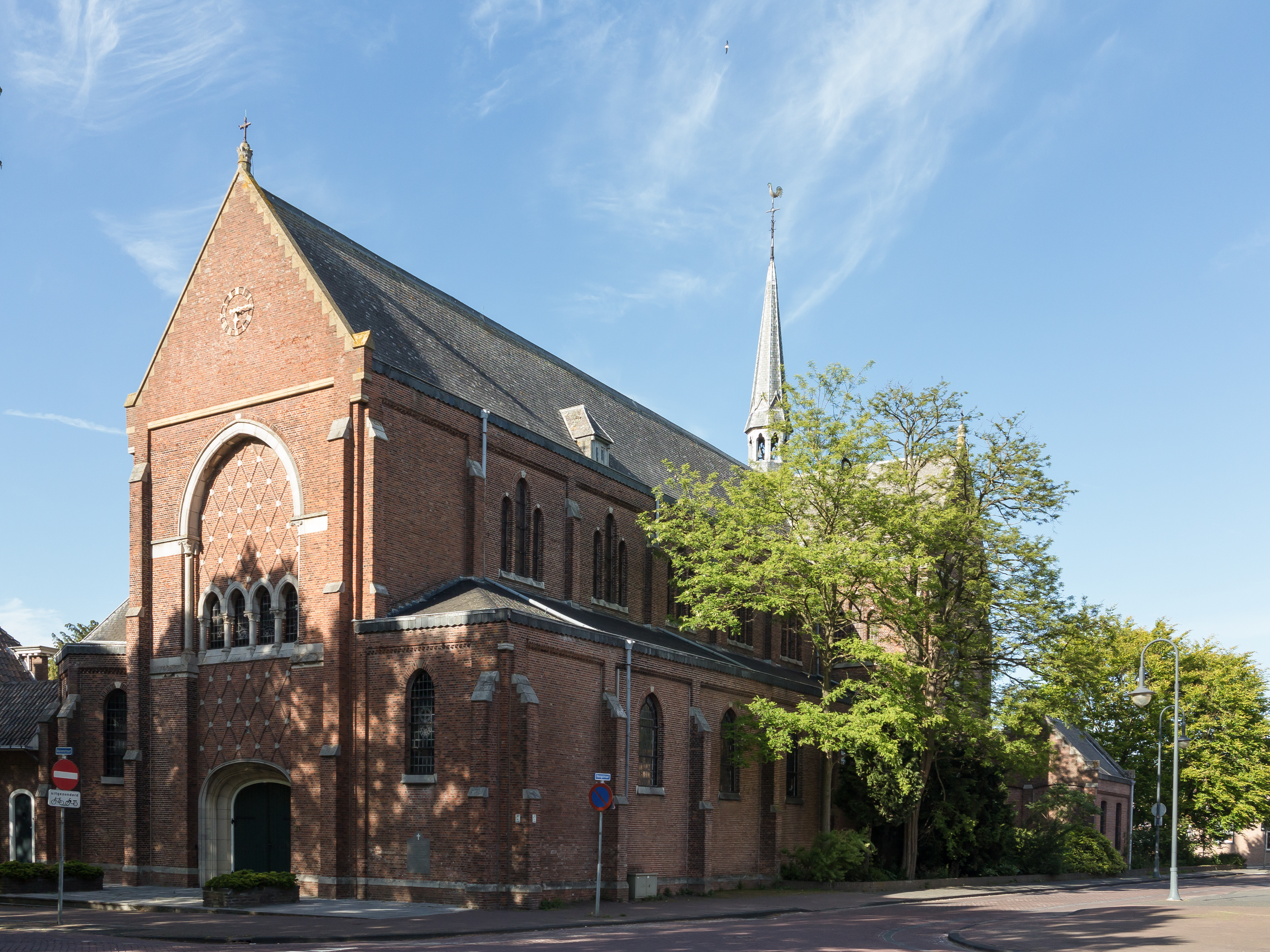
Klundert, church

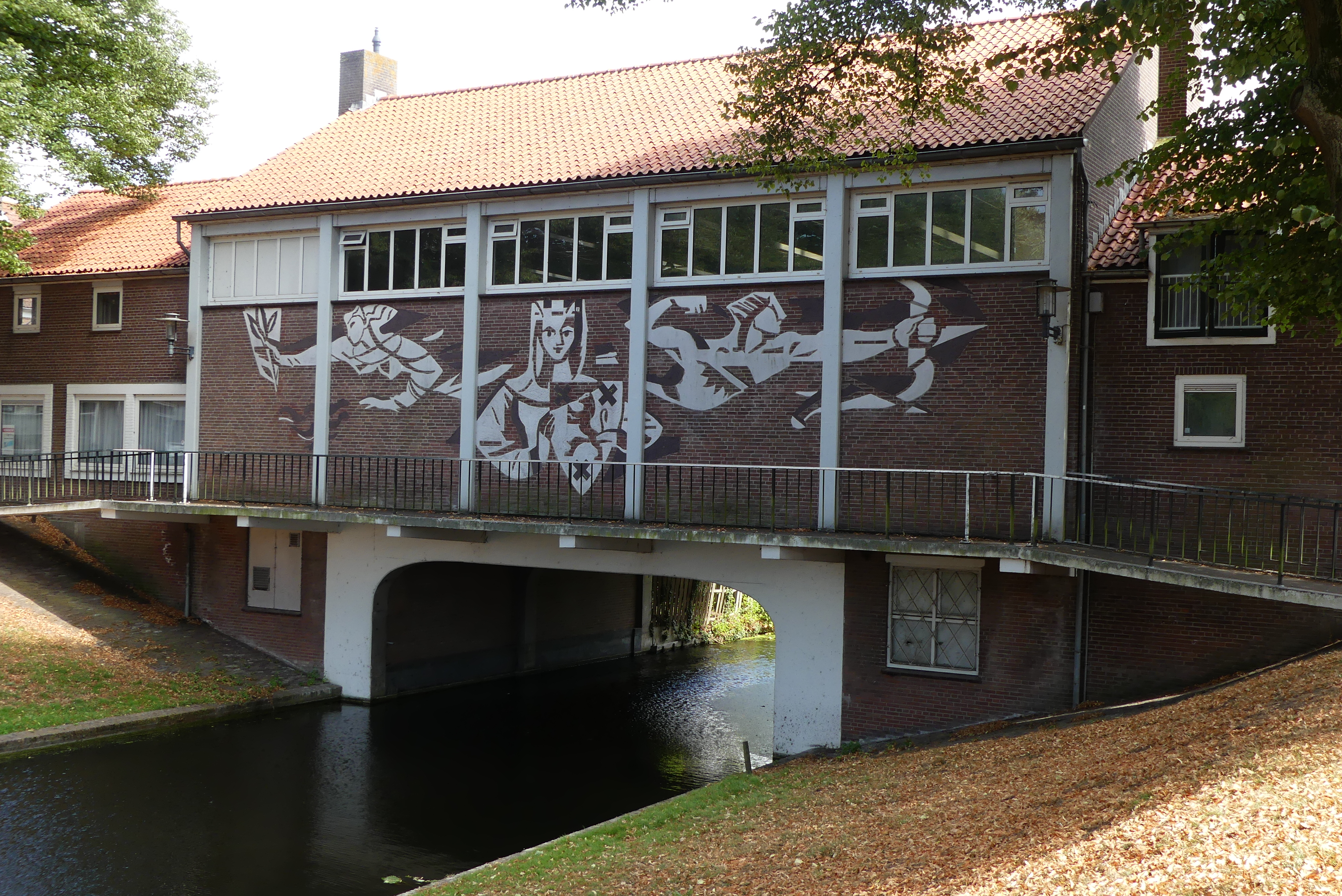
Former bath house Botte Kreek

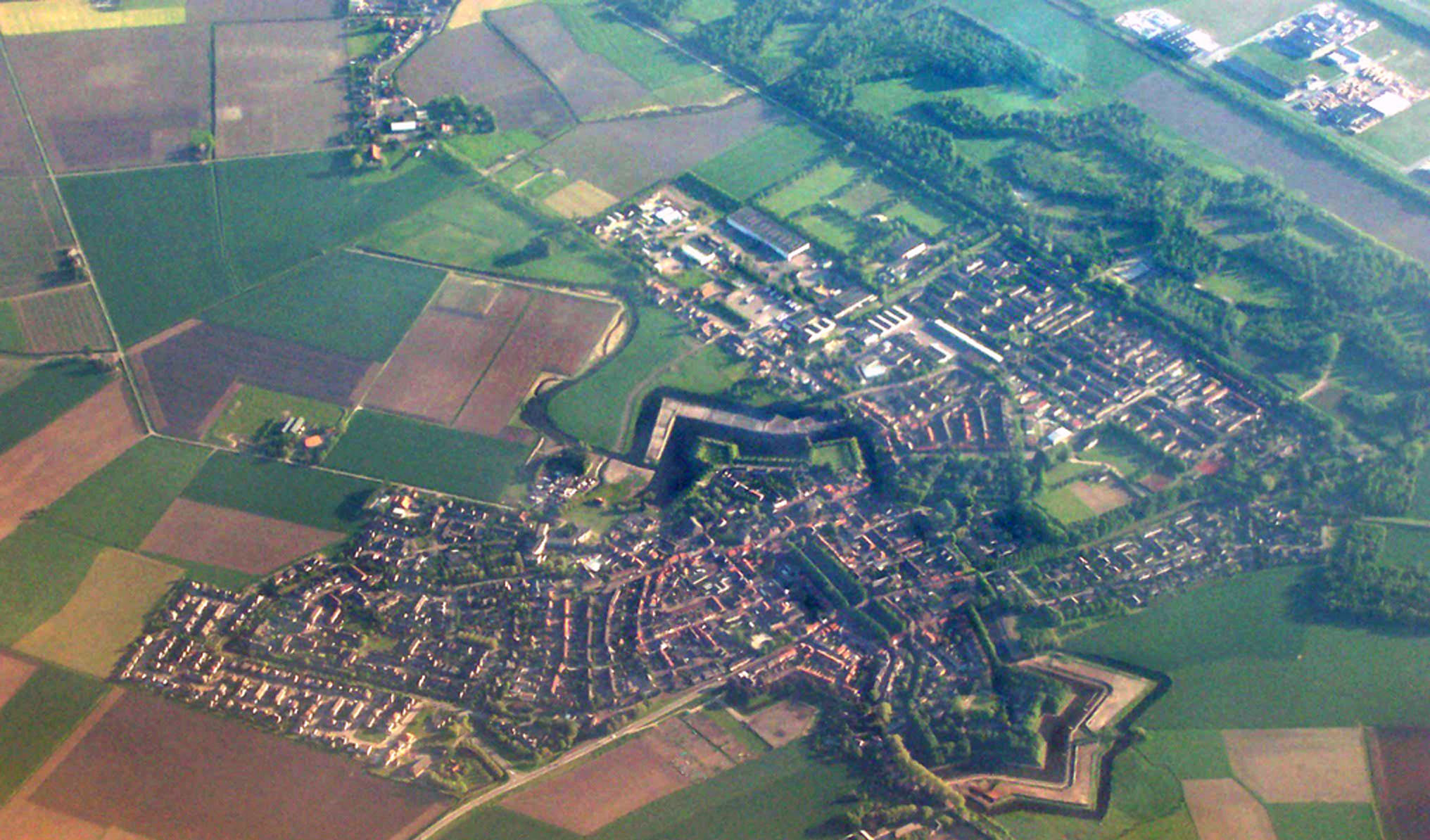
Aerial view

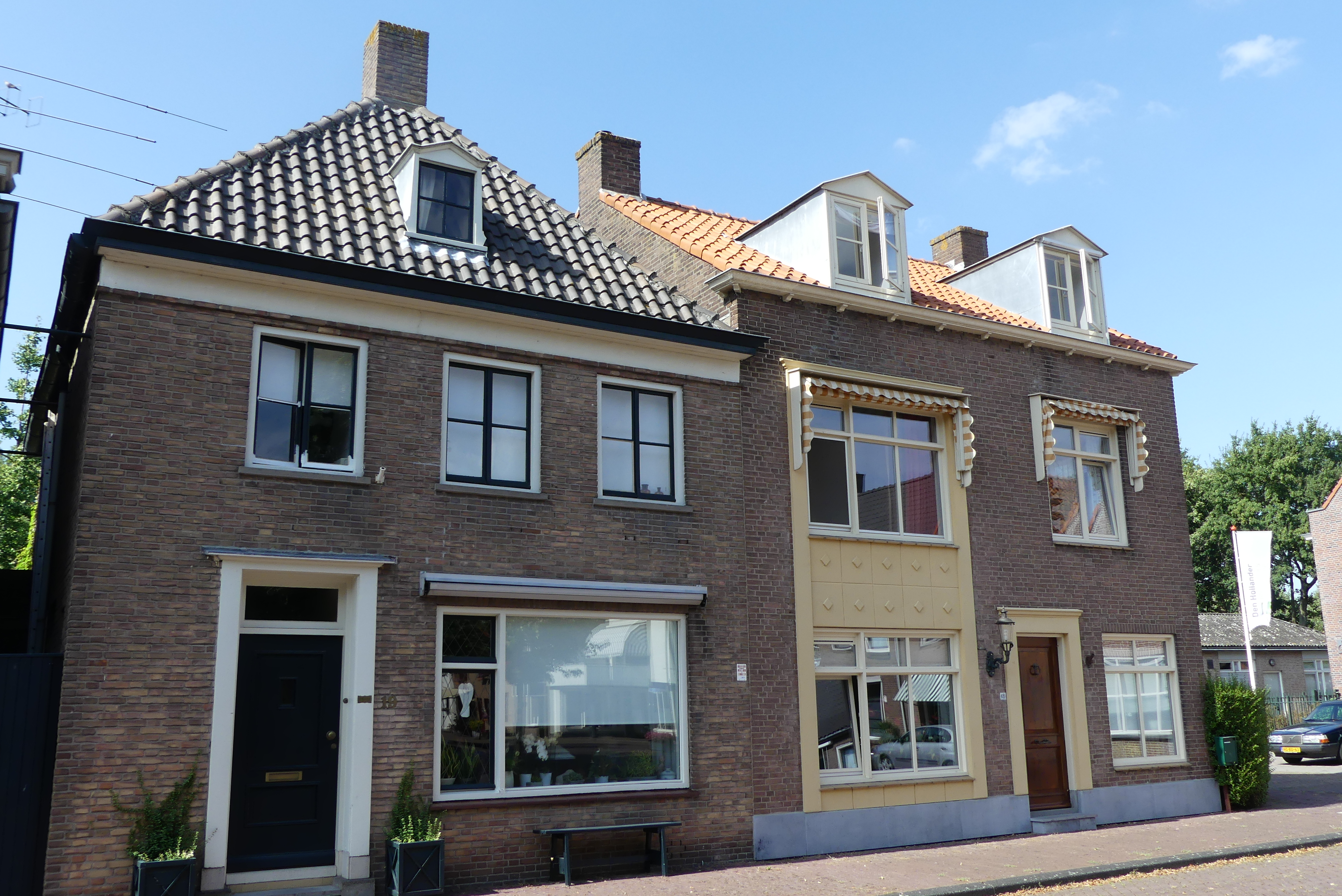
Houses in Klundert
