= Battle of Meijel =

- Part of the Western Front of World War II
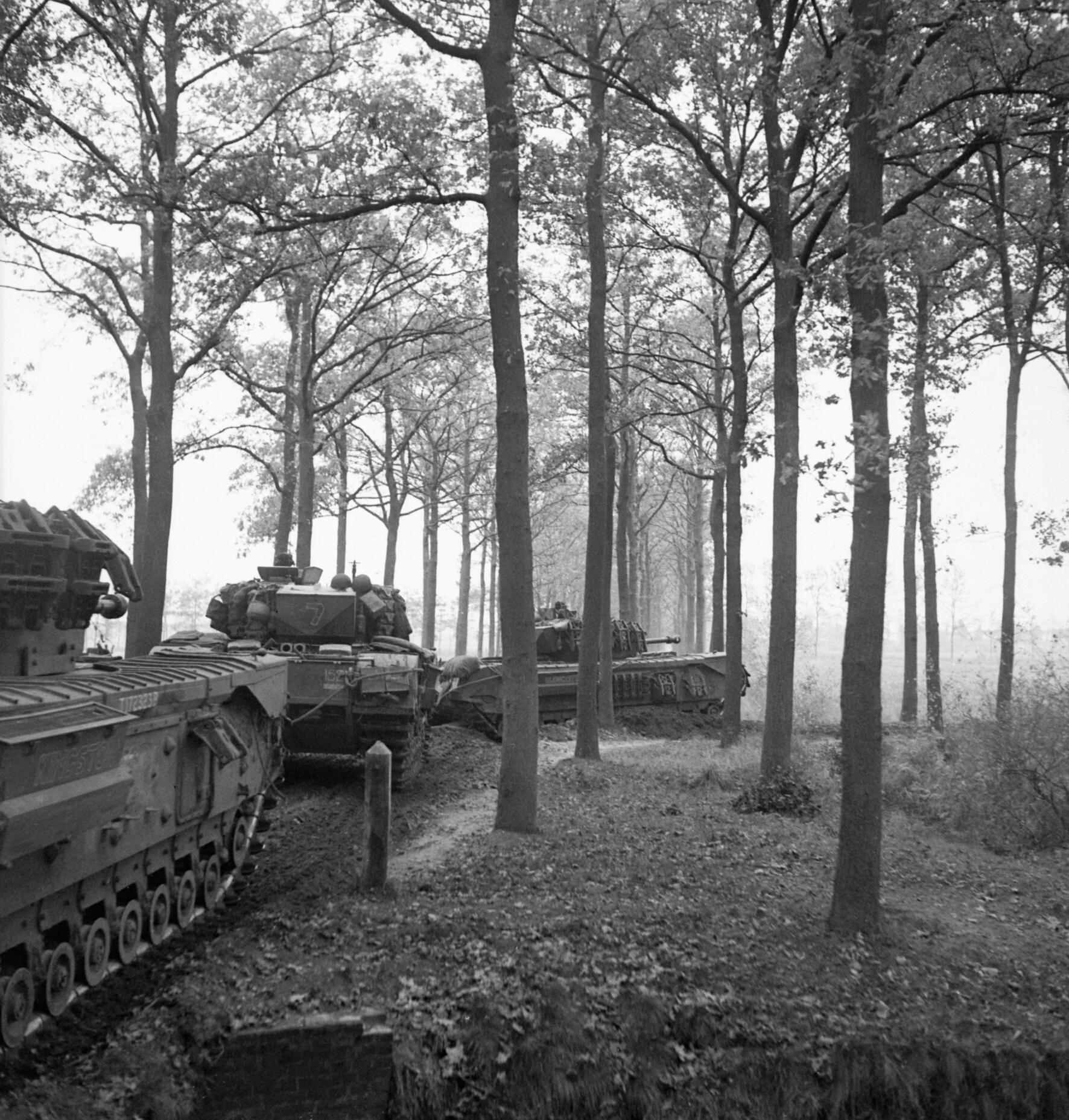
- Churchill tanks of Grenadier Guards near Meijel during the allied counterattack on 1 November 1944
| Date | 27 October – 8 November 1944 |
| Location | Peel Marshes, Netherlands |
| Result | Allied victory |

Belligerents
| United Kingdom; United States | Germany |

Commanders and leaders
| (United Kingdom) Richard O'Connor | (Nazi Germany) Hans von Obstfelder |

Units involved
| (United Kingdom) VIII Corps | (Nazi Germany) XLVII Panzer Corps |

Casualties and losses
| 2,000; 93 tanks | 2,000; 35 tanks |

The Battle of Meijel, also known as the Battle of the Canals, was a German operational offensive that took place during the fighting on the Western Front in World War II. It took place between 27 October and 8 November 1944, as OB West (German high command) hoped that it would divert allied pressure on the offensive into North Brabant.

On 27 October, two divisions of the German XLVII Panzer Corps attempted a surprise offensive to cut the narrow Allied corridor created during Operation Market Garden, in the Peel Marshes along the line north from Nederweert, south to Meijel and Liessel. ON the first day they successfully drove a wedge into elements of the US 7th Armored Division. Within a few days however the attack was contained by recently reinforced British VII Corps which arrived to stem the German advance, and were gradually pushed back.

== Background ==
In September 1944 Operation Market Garden had been undertaken, resulting in a narrow salient that ran from the north of Belgium across the south-east of the Netherlands. It was thus vulnerable to attack.

German forces attacked the salient at its furthest towards Nijmegen but were repelled. Around the same time the allies under Sir Richard O'Connor's British VIII Corps conducted Operation Aintree which was launched to expand the corridor East ward. The offensive removed the German threat albeit at high cost in taking both Overloon and Venray. The US 7th Armored Division recovering from heavy losses sustained in the offensive had withdrawn from the Overloon area and were placed in an area further South around the Peel Marshes near Meijel next to the Belgian Brigade. This area was classed as 'quiet' - the divisional commander Lyndsey Sylvester ordered the division to conduct aggressive patrolling and units were reassigned to the US Ninth Army for training.

On 16 October, Commander of 21st Army Group Field Marshal Bernard Montgomery had reoriented the British 2nd Army under General Miles Dempsey so that this formation's full weight would be available for the Anglo-Canadian effort to open Antwerp and clear the Scheldt as the Allied forces' main supply port. Whilst the Scheldt was being cleared, there was the need to liberate the North Brabant Province with a strong thrust (Operation Pheasant) westward on the axis from towns of Bergen Op Zoom, Tilburg, 's-Hertogenbosch to Breda.

I British Corps commanded by Lieutenant-General John Crocker and XII Corps, commanded by Lieutenant-General Neil Ritchie commenced the attack. Gerd von Rundstedt head of OB West, realised the danger and intended to divert British manpower, and so ordered Field marshal Walter Model of Army Group B to ease the pressure on Fifteenth Army.

Model's plan was two bring XLVII Panzer Corps under General Hans von Obstfelder which consisted of two mechanized divisions 9th Panzer and 15th Panzer Divisions and strike at Dempsey's thinly held positions in the Peel marshes west of Venlo on the Eastern flank of the Market Garden salient. Although not a full strength, 9th Panzer fielded some 22 Panther Tanks, whilst 15th Panzer had six Panzer IVs.

== Battle ==
On 27 October the US 87th Cavalry reconnaissance squadron were covering the towns of Meijel, Liessel and Noordervaart. Dutch civilians had warned the US of a German build up in the area but these warnings were ignored.

=== German offensive ===
At 06:15, 27 October the squadron came under a heavy bombardment which lasted for nearly an hour, the Germans launched a two-division offensive (9th Panzer and 15th Panzer Grenadier) supported by tanks, centred on Meijel around the Canal Du Nord and the Deurne Canal. Included were two Parachute battle groups 'Hubner' and 'Hermann'. The 87th Cavalry Reconnaissance Squadron were taken completely by surprise at Meijel with 45 taken prisoner. The German southern attack centred between Noordervaart and Ospel by crossing the Hoeben Bridge. The hamlets of Winnerstraat, Kreijel and Waatskamp were captured. The 87th Squadron was completely overrun by German paratroopers, most of the former became prisoners of war. The northern attack which centred on Heitrak lasted nearly ten hours of fighting before the village was captured.

Sylvester quickly reinforced the front line units and ordered counterattacks, bringing forward Combat Commands A, R and B. The 87th were then split between CCA and CCR. On 28 October Sylvester launched the attack with CCA and CCR spearheading the advance along the Liessel-Meijel and the Asten-Meijel roads. The Americans however came up against strong opposition, and by the end of the day the counterattacks were repelled with little ground gained. Sylvester called Dempsey for reinforcements; the Germans meanwhile attempted to push forward and made a number of local gains. Dempsey realising the seriousness of the situation quickly ordered the 15th Scottish Division, having just captured Tilberg, to aid the US 7th Armored around Asten.

=== British reinforcements ===
The 15th Scottish and the 6th Guards Tank brigade moved to the Asten area in the early hours of 29 October. In addition artillery units of the 3rd 'Ironside' and 11th Armoured Divisions provided artillery and administrative support.

The Germans in the North meanwhile, continued their attack, the American defences were broken through by tanks, forcing CCB out of Liessel, whilst CCR were also forced out of Asten. The 15th Scottish were only just arriving in the vicinity, when the attack took place which caused confusion. Nevertheless, British artillery stopped the German advance and allowed both US and British forces to reorganize. By this time the Germans had penetrated some six miles into the Allied lines.

During the early hours of 30 October the Germans attacked the woods near Asten but 44th Brigade in defensive positions repelled the attack - assisted by Churchill tanks and divisional artillery, they inflicted heavy casualties on the Germans, who withdrew to their start lines. By this time most of 7th Armored had all been replaced by troops of the 15th Scottish, and backed by powerful artillery.

=== Allied counterattacks ===
The 15th Scottish commander General Colin Barber organised his front, he held the 227 Brigade in a defensive position as Germans continued to make attacks in the hope of gaining Asten, but were repelled.

46 Brigade in the North launched an attack towards Liessel and had cleared the woods just North of the town by end of the day. The 44th then moved forward with elements reaching the suburbs of Liessel in the evening. The following day the attack was renewed with two battalions forcing the Germans out of the town altogether. Later on in the day the village of Sloot was captured, during which a Panzer MK IV holding up the attack was taken out by Lieutenant John Woods firing a PIAT - he later received the Military Cross. Overall the Germans had suffered heavy casualties losing some 25 tanks and three Self propelled guns.

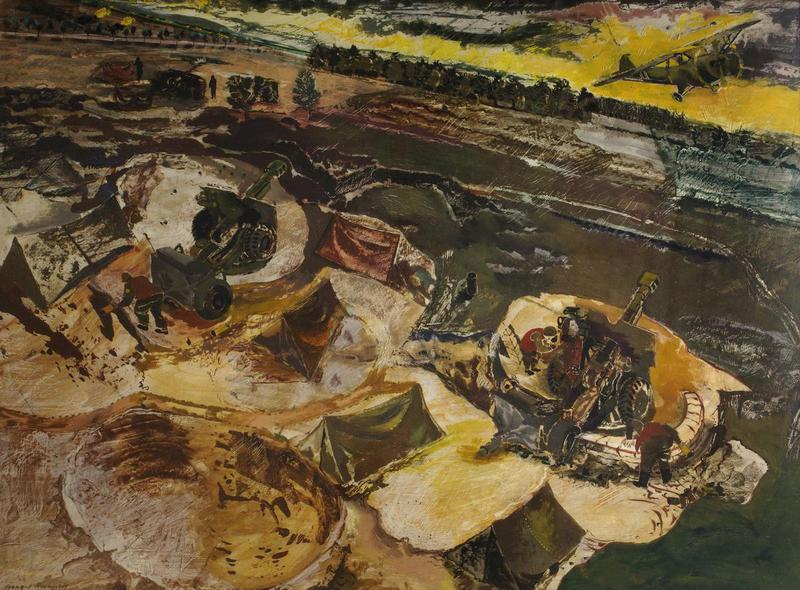
Breaking up the Attack - 25-pounders of the 15th (Scottish) Division firing towards Meijel, by Albert Richards

With the arrival of the British, the Germans made a number of adjustments, on the night of 1/2 November, both 9th and 15th Panzer Divisions withdrew and went into reserve. 9th Panzer was pulled back behind the Deurne canal to stabilize the front line. The counterattack by this time was too late to have any effect. Operation Pheasant, was now moving to its final phase by throwing the Germans beyond the Mark canal on schedule.

15th Scottish continued their attack on 1 November retaking Heitrak, the 7th Armored having reorganised also launched an attack further south taking Nederweerterdijk. On 4 November, 15th Scottish launched an attack on Meijel, but the attack fell largely in a peat bog and due to a combination of weather, mines, soft, muddy ground, as well as heavy resistance from newly arrived 7th Parachute Division, the attack gained little ground. Tanks had to be towed out under a smoke screen. The attack was called off on 8 November, but patrols continued cautiously, and Meijel was found abandoned on 11 November filled with booby traps, and the area filled with mines, soon became a no-man's land.

== Aftermath ==
The German counterattack failed to divert any allied attention away from Operation Pheasant, the German front there already been broken and North Brabant had been liberated.

Despite the performance of the 7th armoured division and praise from Demspey, Sylvester was relieved of command on 13 October by General Omar Bradley who lost confidence in him. Following the battle, the 7th Armored was transferred to the Maastricht front with the rest of the US Ninth Army. The 7th Armored had moderate losses, losing some 1,223 men including some 334 taken prisoner or missing. They had also lost some 80 tanks as well as 81 vehicles of all types. The 15th Scottish which bore the brunt of the allied counterattack had some 750 casualties. In addition the British had lost some thirteen tanks knocked out. In support of the US troops the guns of the 23rd Field Artillery (RA) fired off some 10,000 rounds to successfully break up the German attacks.

The German infantry suffered heavy losses heavy losses; some 2,500 men killed wounded or captured. 35 tanks overall were lost (12 Panthers, 23 Panzer IVs and Tiger I) and 16 vehicles of all types of which they could ill afford to lose.

On 27 November O'Connor was removed from his post - Montgomery prompted the move for, "not being ruthless enough with his American subordinates". He was succeeded as GOC VIII Corps by Major-General Evelyn Barker.

=== Venlo pocket operations ===
A renewed attack commenced on 14 November with Operations Mallard, Guildford and Nutcracker. This drive, beginning with Mallard entailed clearing the Venlo 'Pocket'. This time the Germans had pulled back and VIII Corps was able to advance - Meijel was cleared and the area beyond was taken with minimal resistance. The British broke through the German second defence line covering Venlo on 22 November, and on 3 December 15th Scottish captured Blerick, the last German bridgehead on the Maas. The operations were a big success with minimal casualties and VIII Corps had closed up to River Mass at Venlo.

The Germans were in a difficult position as the exposed Venlo bridgehead over the Maas river was now the key to enter the Ruhr district. The Germans however hoped that a new larger counterattack would relieve the situation, and the Ardennes offensive commenced on 16 December, but ultimately failed.

== Bibliography ==
- Buckley, John (2013). Monty's Men: The British Army and the Liberation of Europe. Yale University Press. ISBN 9780300160352.
- Copp, Terry; Vogel, Robert (1985). Maple Leaf Route: Scheldt. University of Toronto Press. ISBN 9780919907041.
- Delaforce, Patrick (2004). Monty's Northern Legions 50th Northumbrian and 15th Scottish Divisions at War 1939–1945. Sutton. ISBN 9780750935562.
- Ellis, Lionel F.; Allen, G.R.G.; Warhurst, A.E.; Robb, James (2004) [1962]. Butler, J. R. M. (ed.). Victory in the West: The Defeat of Germany. History of the Second World War, United Kingdom Military Series. Vol. II. London: Naval & Military Press. ISBN 978-1-845-74059-7.
- Forty, Simon; Forty, Jonathan (2020). Tank Warfare, 1939–1945. Pen and Sword. ISBN 9781526767653.
- Guderian, Heinz Günther (2001). From Normandy to the Ruhr: With the 116th Panzer Division in World War II. Aberjona Press. ISBN 9780966638974.
- Hamilton, Nigel (1986). Monty: The Final Years of the Field-Marshal 1944-1976. McGraw-Hill Book Company. ISBN 9780070258075.
- Hart, Russell; Hart, Stephen (2010). World War II: Northwest Europe 1944–1945. The Rosen Publishing Group, Inc. ISBN 9781435891296.
- Haasler, Timm (2022). Hold the Westwall The History of Panzer Brigade 105, September 1944. Globe Pequot. ISBN 9780811769297.
- Yeide, Harry (2008). Steeds of Steel. Zenith Press. ISBN 9781616738990.
