= 7th Armored Division (United States) =

WW2 US Army formation

- 7th Armored Division shoulder sleeve insignia
- Active: 1 March 1942–9 October 1945; 10 November 1950–15 November 1953
- Country: United States
- Branch: United States Army
- Type: Armor
- Role: Armored warfare
- Size: Division
- Nickname: "Lucky Seventh"
- Engagements: World War II; Northern France; Rhineland; Ardennes-Alsace; Central Europe
- Decorations: Belgian fourragère; Croix de guerre (Belgium); Netherlands Resistance Memorial Cross; Medal of Verdun

Insignia
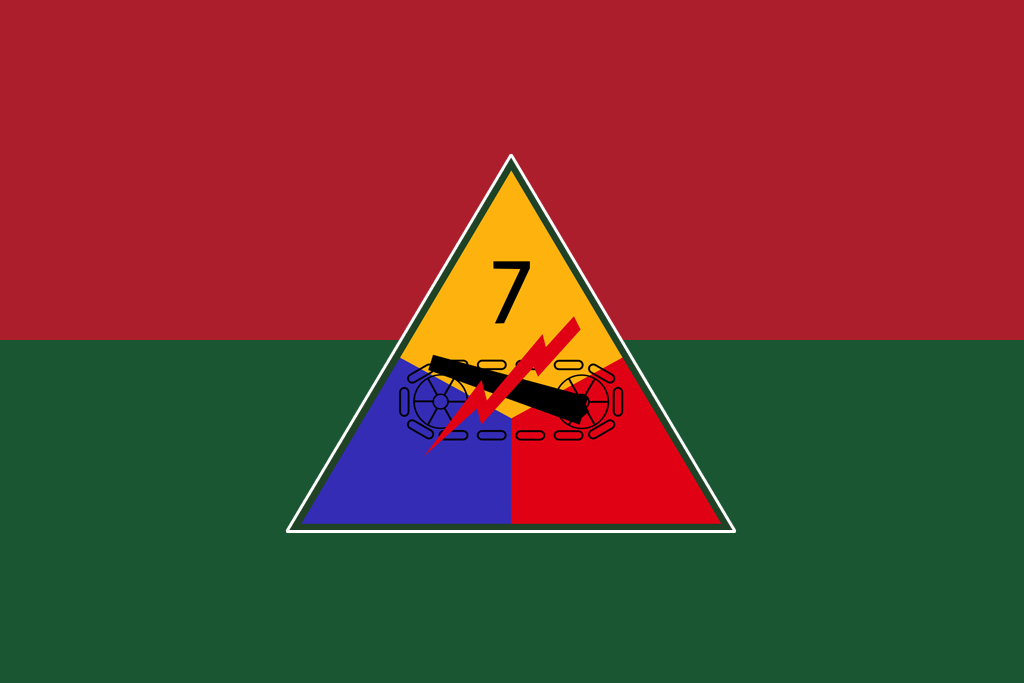
- Flag of the United States Army 7th Armored Division

The 7th Armored Division ("Lucky Seventh") was an armored division of the United States Army that saw distinguished service on the Western Front, from August 1944 until May 1945, during World War II. They also performed occupation duties in Germany through September 1945.

== History ==
The division was activated in the Army of the United States on 1 March 1942, in Camp Polk, Louisiana, out of "surplus" elements of the reorganized 3rd and 5th Armored Divisions, and itself reorganized on 20 September 1943. The 7th Armored Division trained at Camp Coxcomb in California. The 7th Armored Division arrived in England in June 1944. Throughout most of its existence the 7th Armored Division was commanded by Major General Lindsay M. Silvester, an infantryman who had distinguished himself in World War I.

=== Division organization ===
==== Heavy armored division ====
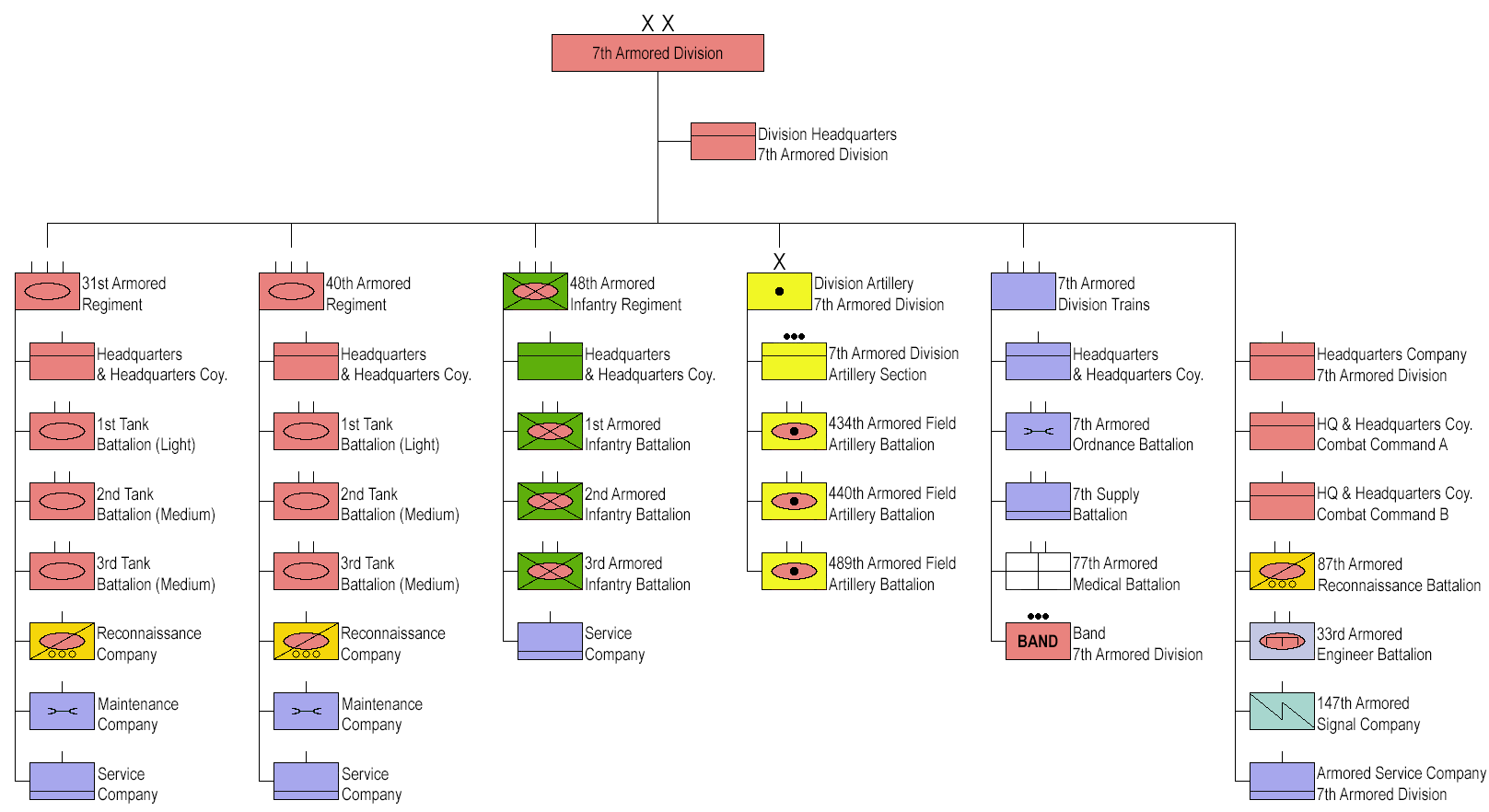
7th Armored Division organization after the division's activation (click to enlarge)

The division was activated as a heavy armored division in 1942. At the time the 7th Armored Division was composed of the following units:

- 7th Armored Division
  - Division Headquarters
  - Headquarters Company, 7th Armored Division
  - Headquarters and Headquarters Company, Combat Command A
  - Headquarters and Headquarters Company, Combat Command B
  - 147th Armored Signal Company
  - Armored Service Company (includes the division's Military Police Platoon)
  - 31st Armored Regiment (transferred from the 5th Armored Division)
    - Headquarters and Headquarters Company
    - Reconnaissance Company (M3 scout cars and T30 HMC self propelled guns)
    - Maintenance Company
    - Service Company
    - 1st Tank Battalion (Light)
      - Headquarters and Headquarters Company
      - 3× Light Tank companies (A, B, C) (M3/M5 Stuart light tanks)
    - 2nd Tank Battalion (Medium)
      - Headquarters and Headquarters Company
      - 3× Medium Tank companies (D, E, F) (M4 Sherman tanks)
    - 3rd Tank Battalion (Medium)
      - Headquarters and Headquarters Company
      - 3× Medium Tank companies (G, H, I) (M4 Sherman tanks)
  - 40th Armored Regiment
    - same organization as 31st Armored Regiment
  - 48th Armored Infantry Regiment
    - Headquarters and Headquarters Company
    - 3× Armored infantry battalions
      - each battalion consists of: 1× Headquarters and Headquarters Company, 3× Rifle companies on M3 half-tracks
    - Service Company
  - 87th Armored Reconnaissance Battalion
    - Headquarters and Headquarters Company
    - 3× Reconnaissance companies (M3 scout cars)
    - Light Tank Company (M3/M5 Stuart light tanks)
  - 33rd Armored Engineer Battalion
    - Headquarters and Headquarters Company
    - 4× Armored engineer companies
    - Bridge Company
  - 7th Armored Division Artillery
    - 7th Armored Division Artillery Section
    - 434th Armored Field Artillery Battalion
      - Headquarters and Headquarters Battery
      - 3× Field artillery batteries (M7 Priest self propelled howitzers)
      - Service Battery
    - 440th Armored Field Artillery Battalion
      - same organization as 434th Armored Field Artillery Battalion
    - 489th Armored Field Artillery Battalion
      - same organization as 434th Armored Field Artillery Battalion
  - 7th Armored Division Trains
    - Headquarters and Headquarters Company
    - 14th Armored Ordnance Battalion
      - Headquarters and Headquarters Company
      - 3× Maintenance companies
    - 14th Supply Battalion
      - Headquarters and Headquarters Company
      - 2× Truck companies
    - 77th Armored Medical Battalion
      - Headquarters and Headquarters Company
      - 3× Medical companies
    - 7th Armored Division Band

==== Light armored division ====
Early in 1943, the Army Ground Force began a series of studies to reorganize the various divisions within the Army. After reviewing the tables of organization and after allowing the various commands to review and comment on the proposed restructure, the War Department published on 15 September 1943 a new armored division tables of organization. The restructuring removed the two armored regiments and armored infantry regiment from the table of organization and replaced them with three tank battalions and three armored infantry battalions. Each tank battalion included one light and three medium tank companies. Both Combat Commands, A and B, remained, but an additional Reserve Command was added to the organization. This was a small headquarters element of 10 personnel tasked to clarify command and control in the division's rear area. Armored engineer battalions lost their bridge companies, while their engineer companies were reduced from four to three. The division's cavalry reconnaissance squadron was increased in size to include an HQ Troop, four reconnaissance troops, a light tank company, and an assault gun troop of four platoons (one for each reconnaissance troop). Within the division trains, the division lost its supply battalion and the division's armored service company. These changes pared the division's strength from 14,630 men to 10,937, slashed the number of tanks from 360 to 263, reduced the variety of vehicles to ease repair problems, and eliminated the maintenance-prone motorcycles.

After its reorganization as a light armored division the 7th Armored Division was composed of the following units:

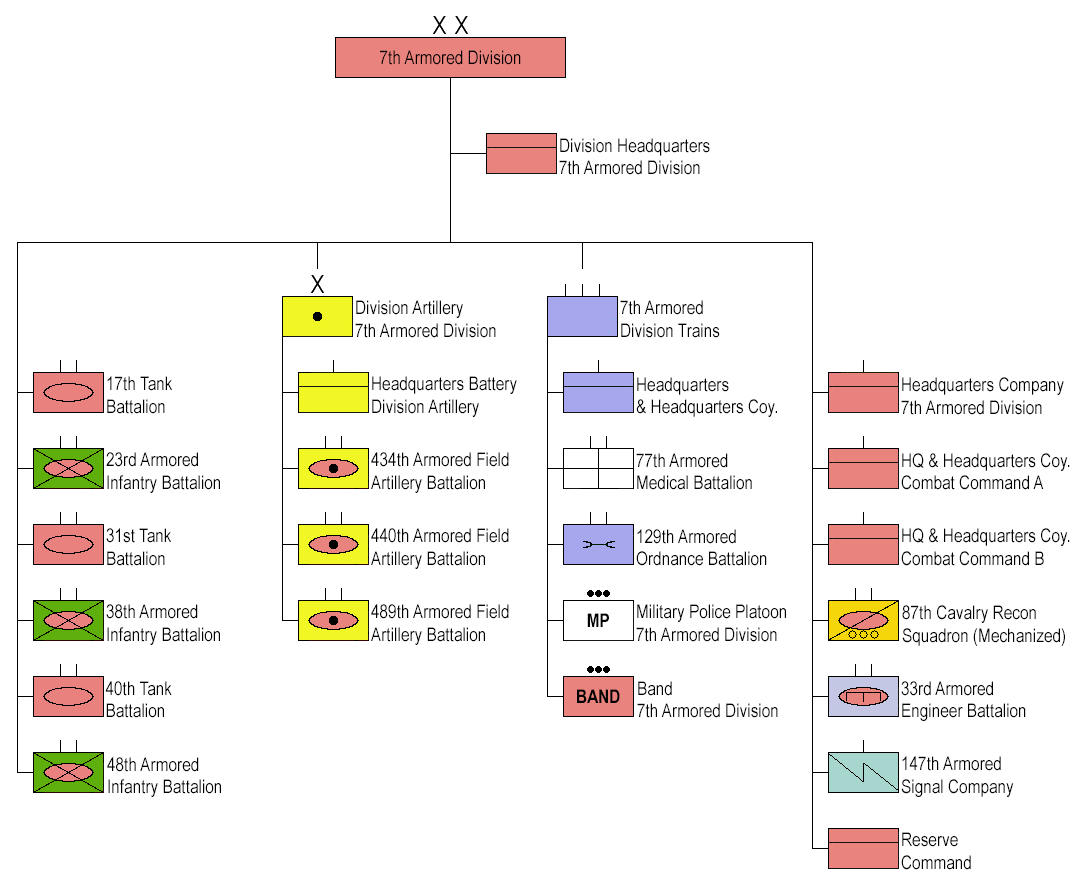
7th Armored Division organization after the division's reorganization (click to enlarge)

- 7th Armored Division
  - Division Headquarters
  - Headquarters Company, 7th Armored Division
  - Headquarters and Headquarters Company, Combat Command A
  - Headquarters and Headquarters Company, Combat Command B
  - 147th Armored Signal Company
  - Reserve Command
  - 17th Tank Battalion
    - Headquarters and Headquarters Company
    - 3× Medium Tank companies (M4 Sherman tanks)
    - Light Tank Company (M3/M5 Stuart or M24 Chaffee light tanks)
    - Service Company
  - 31st Tank Battalion
    - same organization as 17th Tank Battalion
  - 40th Tank Battalion
    - same organization as 17th Tank Battalion
  - 23rd Armored Infantry Battalion
    - Headquarters and Headquarters Company
    - 3× Rifle companies (M3 half-tracks)
    - Service Company
  - 38th Armored Infantry Battalion
    - same organization as 23rd Armored Infantry Battalion
  - 48th Armored Infantry Battalion
    - same organization as 23rd Armored Infantry Battalion
  - 87th Cavalry Reconnaissance Squadron (Mechanized)
    - Headquarters and Headquarters and Service Troop
    - 4× Cavalry reconnaissance troops (M8 Greyhound armored cars)
    - Cavalry Assault Gun Troop (M8 Scott self propelled guns)
    - Light Tank Company (M3/M5 Stuart or M24 Chaffee light tanks)
  - 33rd Armored Engineer Battalion
    - Headquarters and Headquarters Company
    - 3× Armored engineer companies
  - 7th Armored Division Artillery
    - Headquarters and Headquarters Battery
    - 434th Armored Field Artillery Battalion
      - Headquarters and Headquarters Battery
      - 3× Field artillery batteries (M7 Priest self propelled howitzers)
      - Service Battery
    - 440th Armored Field Artillery Battalion
      - same organization as 434th Armored Field Artillery Battalion
    - 489th Armored Field Artillery Battalion
      - same organization as 434th Armored Field Artillery Battalion
  - 7th Armored Division Trains
    - Headquarters and Headquarters Company
    - 77th Armored Medical Battalion
      - Headquarters and Headquarters Company
      - 3× Medical companies
    - 129th Armored Ordnance Battalion
      - Headquarters and Headquarters Company
      - 3× Maintenance companies
    - Military Police Platoon
    - 7th Armored Division Band

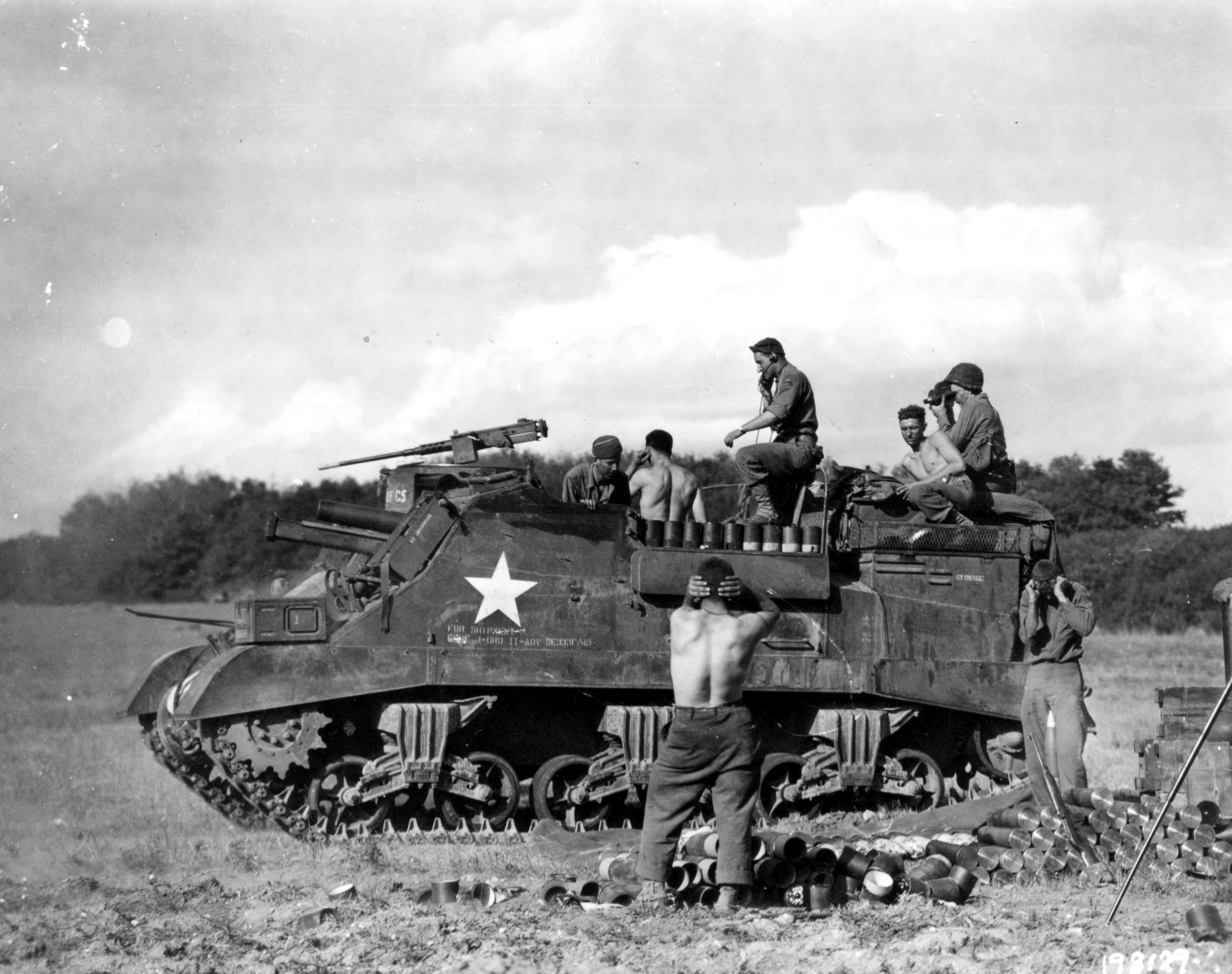
7th Armored Division M7 self-propelled howitzer near Anet, France. August 1944

=== Action in France ===
The 7th Armored Division landed on Omaha and Utah Beaches, 13–14 August 1944, and was assigned to U.S. Third Army, commanded by Lieutenant General George S. Patton. The division drove through Nogent-le-Rotrou in an attack on Chartres. The city fell on 18 August. From Chartres, the division advanced to liberate Dreux and then Melun, where they crossed the Seine River, 24 August. The division then pushed on to bypass Reims and liberate Château-Thierry and then Verdun, 31 August. In an unprecedented move, on September 7, 1944, the City of Verdun awarded the Medal of Verdun (originally a WWI medal) to the officers and soldiers of the 7th Armored. This was the first time the Medal of Verdun was awarded during WWII. Additionally, by Resolution of the Verdun City Council, dated 15 September 1944, one of the municipality’s streets was renamed "RUE DE LA 7e DIVISION BLINDEE U.S.A." in honor of the Division.

The 7th Armored halted briefly for refueling and then on 6 September drove on toward the Moselle and made a crossing near Dornot. This crossing had to be withdrawn in the face of the heavy fortifications around Metz. The 7th Armored then made attempts to cross the Moselle northwest of Metz but the deep river valley was not suitable terrain for an armored attack. Elements of the division assisted the 5th Infantry Division in expanding a bridgehead east of Arnaville, south of Metz, and on 15 September, the main part of the division crossed the Moselle there. The 7th Armored Division was repulsed in its attacks across the Seille River at and near Sillegny, part of an attack in conjunction with the 5th Infantry division that was also repulsed further north.

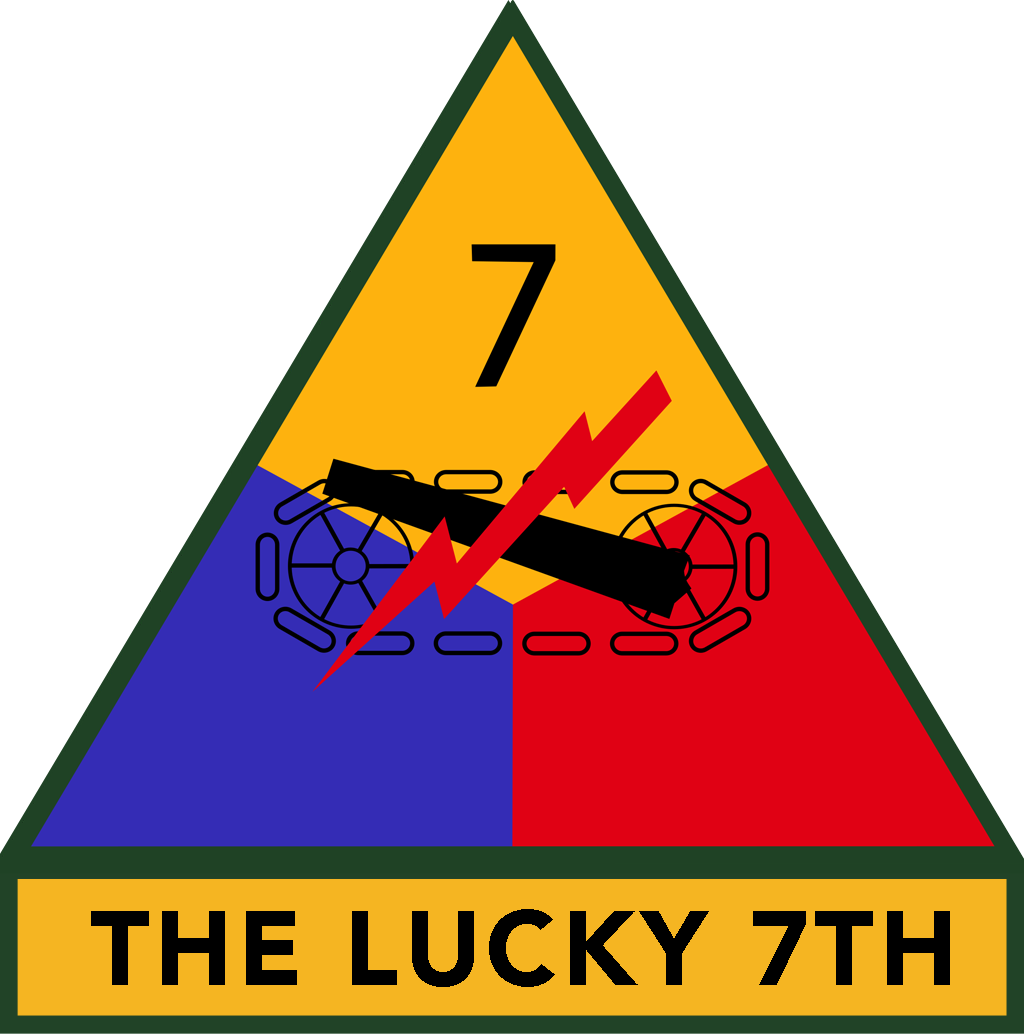
7th Armored Division Lucky 7th Insignia

=== Support of Operation Market Garden ===
On 25 September 1944, the 7th Armored Division was transferred to the U.S. Ninth Army, under Lieutenant General William Hood Simpson, and began the march to the Netherlands where they were needed to protect the right (east) flank of the corridor opened by Operation Market Garden. They were to operate in the southeast Netherlands, so that British and Canadian forces and the 104th Infantry Division could clear the Germans from the Scheldt Estuary in the southwest Netherlands and open the shipping lanes to the critical port of Antwerp, to allow Allied ships to bring supplies from Britain.

On 30 September, the 7th Armored Division launched an attack from the north on the town of Overloon, against significant German defenses. The attacks progressed slowly and finally settled into a series of counter-attacks reminiscent of trench warfare of World War I. On 8 October, the division was relieved from the attack on Overloon by the British 11th Armoured Division and moved south of Overloon to the Deurne–Weert area. Here they were attached to the British Second Army, under Lieutenant General Sir Miles C. Dempsey, and ordered to make demonstration attacks to the east, in order to divert enemy forces from the Overloon and Venlo areas, where British troops pressed the attack. This plan succeeded, and the British were finally able to liberate Overloon.

On 27 October 1944, the main part of the 7th Armored Division was in essentially defensive positions along the line Nederweert (and south) to Meijel to Liesel, with the demonstration force still in the attack across the Deurne canal to the east. The Germans launched a two-division offensive centered on Meijel, catching the thinly stretched 87th Cavalry Reconnaissance Squadron of the 7th Armored Division by surprise. However, the response by the 7th Armored and by British Lieutenant General Sir Richard O'Connor's British VIII Corps, to which the division was attached, stopped the German attack on the third day and then from 31 October to 8 November gradually drove the enemy out of the terrain that they had taken. During this operation, at midnight on the night of 31 October–1 November Major General Lindsay Silvester, who had led the division since its activation, was relieved as commander of the division and replaced by Major General Robert W. Hasbrouck.

=== Refit and retraining ===
On 8 November 1944, the 7th Armored was again transferred to the Ninth Army and moved south to rest areas at and east of Maastricht. Following an inflow of many replacements, they began extensive training and reorganization, since so many original men had been lost in France and the Netherlands that a significant part of the division was now men who had never trained together. At the end of November, the division straddled the Dutch-German border with one combat command in Germany (in the area of Ubach, north of Aachen) and two in the Netherlands.

Elements of the division were attached to the 84th Infantry Division for operations in early December in the area of Linnich, Germany, on the banks of the Rur. The 7th was preparing to drive into Germany when the Ardennes offensive began on 16 December 1944.

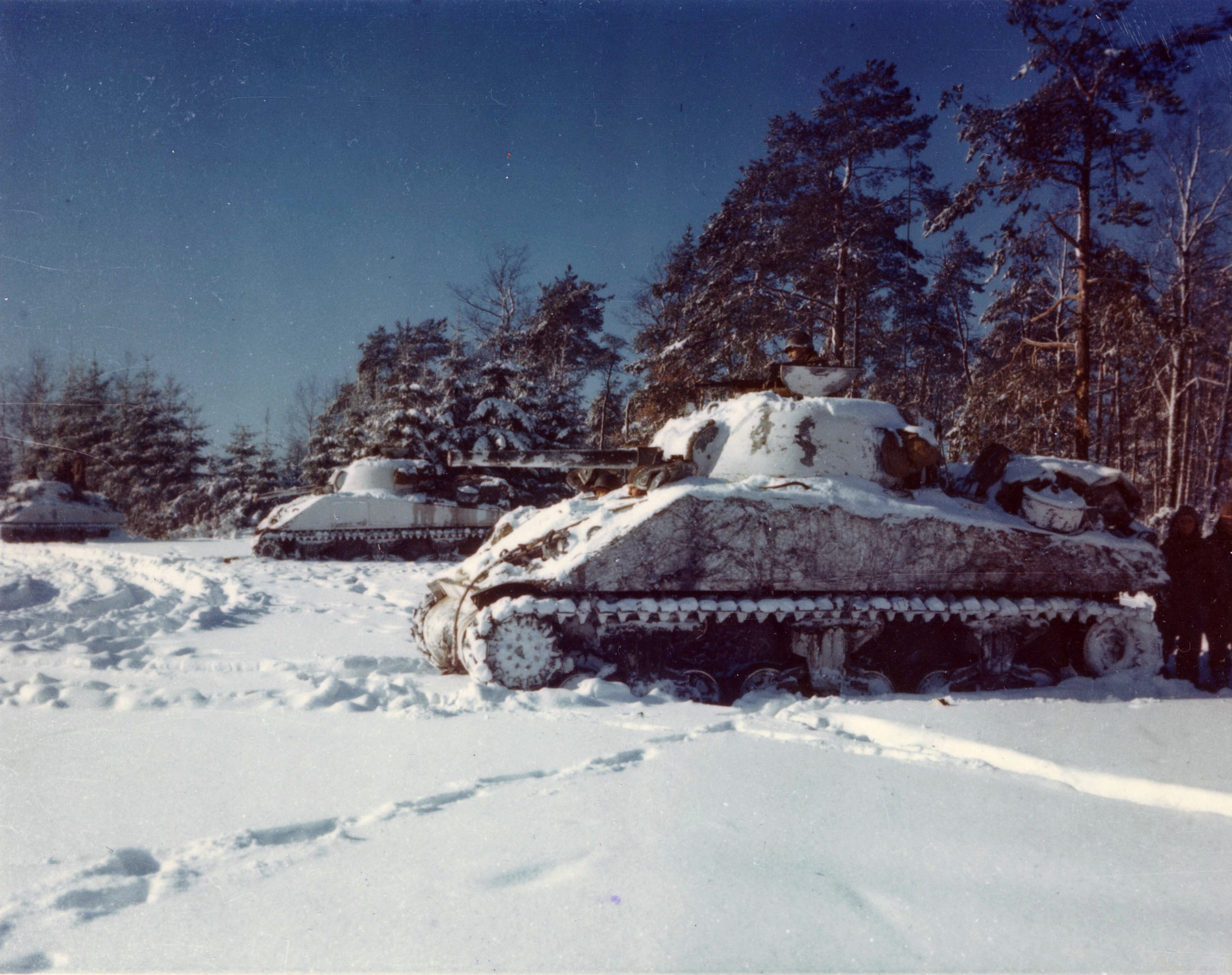
7th Armored Division Sherman tanks in a snow-covered field near St. Vith, Belgium. January 1945

=== Battle of the Bulge ===
The division was transferred to the U.S. First Army, under Lieutenant General Courtney Hodges, and ordered to St. Vith, Belgium, a critical road and rail center needed by the Germans to supply their offensive. Over the course of almost a week, the 7th Armored (along with elements of the 106th, the 28th Infantry Division and 9th Armored Divisions) absorbed much of the weight of the German drive, throwing the German time table into great disarray, before being forced to withdraw west of the Salm River on 23 December. The division moved to the area of Manhay, Belgium, and by the end of December had cleared the town of the enemy. They were then relieved by the 75th Infantry Division. After a brief rest in January 1945, the division returned to positions near St. Vith, attacked, and re-captured the town on 23 January 1945. The 7th armored division was awarded both the Croix de guerre (Belgium) and the Belgian fourragère for their action.

=== Movement into Germany ===
In February 1945, now attached to the U.S. First Army's V Corps, the division returned to Germany. In the first week of the month, Combat Command R was attached to 78th Infantry Division for attacks on Strauch, Simmerath, Steckenborn, and other towns in the area of the Huertgen Forest. The Division remained in the area of Steckenborn, Germany throughout the month, waiting for the flood waters to recede after the Germans destroyed major dams in the Allies' path. However, large contingents of men were sent back into Belgium and attached to Engineer Combat Battalions (e.g. most of the men of 38 AIB were attached to 1110 Engineers at Stavelot) from 12 to 27 February, for use as laborers in using logs to build a solid base for the torn-up roads through the Ardennes Forest.

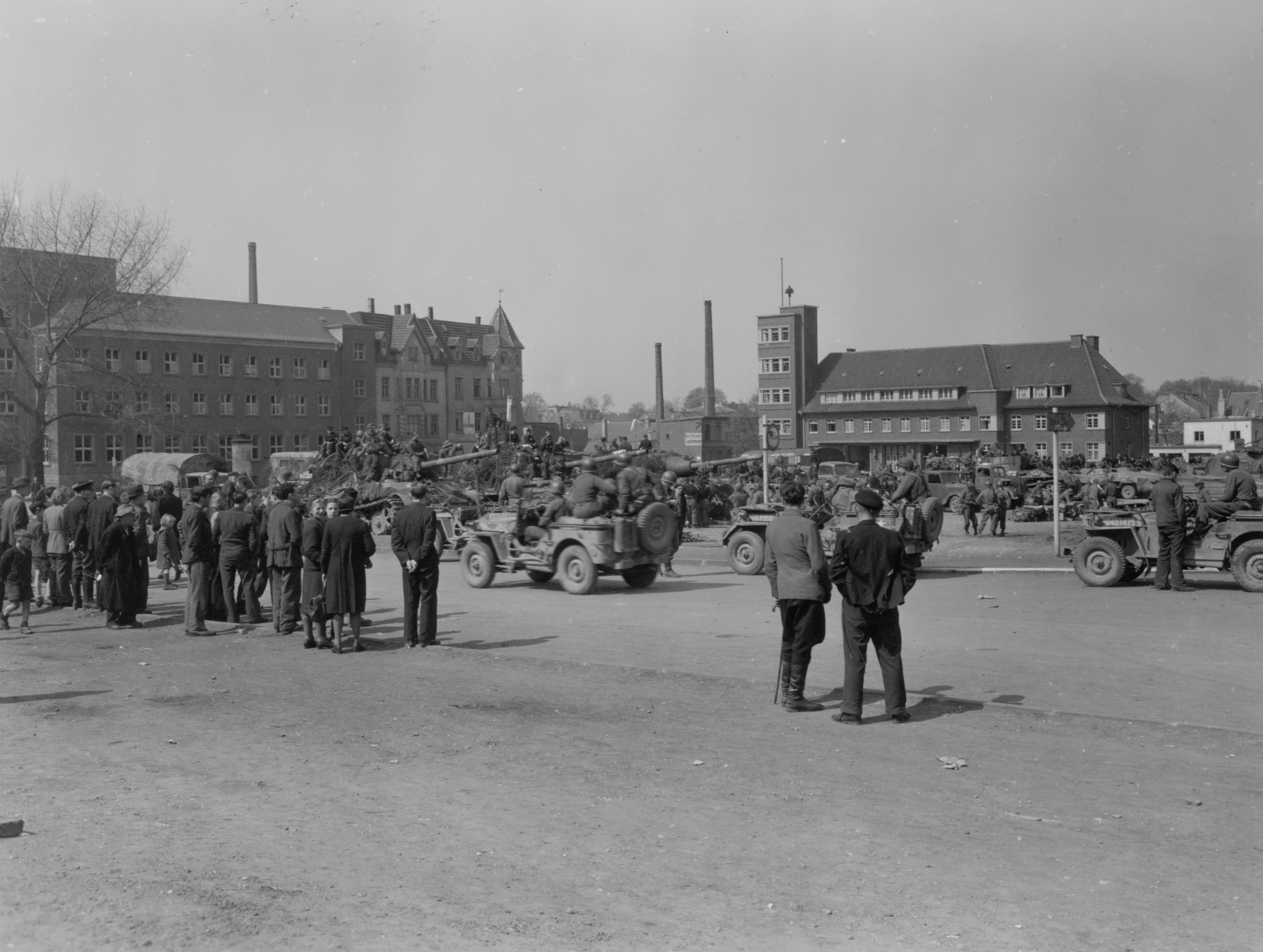
Germans of the 53rd Panzer Corps bring equipment to a plaza in Iserlohn after surrendering to the 7th Armored Division. April 1945.

In March 1945, the 7th Armored took part in two major breakthroughs with a two-week period during which they established and maintained an important defensive position. The first breakthrough came early in March when the division, as part of the III Corps, pushed east from the Rur river to establish a defensive position along the west bank of the Rhine, south of Bonn to Unkelbach. The second major breakthrough began 26 March when the division, still under III Corps control, took part in an armored offensive intended to break the thin crust ringing the Remagen bridgehead and overrun the rich German farmland to the east and north and surround the Ruhr Pocket in a double envelopment.

In April, the 7th Armored Division completed their part of the encirclement of the Ruhr Pocket and captured the critical Edersee Dam. They then attacked into the Ruhr Pocket, in order to reduce it. On 16 April the LIII Panzer Corps surrendered to the division and the eastern sector of the pocket collapsed. The 7th Armored, after a brief rest, were then transferred once again to the British Second Army and moved north to the Baltic Sea. From this area, Lieutenant William A. Knowlton led a force eastward to make contact with the Red Army. The 7th Armored Division remained in this area until the war in Europe ended.

=== Casualties ===
- Total battle casualties: 5,799
- Killed in action: 898
- Wounded in action: 3,811
- Missing in action: 165
- Prisoner of war: 925

=== Occupation duty ===
The division was then moved into the future Soviet zone of occupation, at Dessau, Germany. President Truman wanted one of his armored divisions parading in front of him on the 4 July in Berlin, and 2nd and 7th Armored were both prepared for the honor. When the 2nd Armored was chosen for the parade, 7th Armored immediately moved southwest to the future American zone of occupation.

The division then began to be gradually filled with more and more new faces, as the veterans were transferred elsewhere. The first large contingent of veterans left in mid July: these were low-point men who were headed back to the United States to begin training for the invasion of Japan. Other large groups of high-point men were transferred to other units that were going back home before the 7th Armored Division was inactivated.

=== Inactivation ===
The division returned to New York and was inactivated on 11 October 1945.

=== Achievements ===
During its service in World War II, the 7th Armored Division captured and destroyed a disproportionate number of enemy vehicles and took more than 100,000 prisoners.

=== Enemy vehicles destroyed and prisoners captured ===
- Armored vehicles destroyed: 621;
- Armored vehicles captured: 89;
- Miscellaneous vehicles destroyed: 2,653;
- Miscellaneous vehicles captured: 3,517;
- Armament destroyed: 583 pieces;
- Armament captured (only pieces larger than 50mm included): 361;
- Prisoners taken: 113,041.

=== Division statistics ===
- Distance travelled 2,260 miles (3,640 km);
- Gasoline consumed 3,127,151 US gallons (11,837,550 L; 2,603,898 imp gal)
- Ammunition expended
- 105mm: 350,027 rounds
- 76mm: 19,209 rounds
- 75mm: 48,724 rounds
- .50cal: 1,267,128 rounds
- .45cal: 540,523 rounds
- .30cal: 9,367,966 rounds

=== Decorations awarded ===
- Medal of Honor: 2
- Distinguished Service Cross: 11
- Silver Star Medal: 351
- Bronze Star Medal: 888 (although all unit members who were awarded the CIB or CMB in WW2 were retroactively awarded a Bronze Star in 1947)
- Meritorious Service Medal: 1,047
- Purple Hearts: 1,211
- Presidential Unit Citation: 1
- Croix de guerre (Belgium)
- Belgian Fourragère
- Netherlands Resistance Memorial Cross
- Medal of Verdun (First time it was awarded for action in WWII)

=== Korean War activation ===
The division was reactivated in the early 1950s, but was not sent to Korea. It was stationed at Camp Roberts, California for the duration of the conflict.
