= Meijel =

Meijel Méél
- Village and former municipality
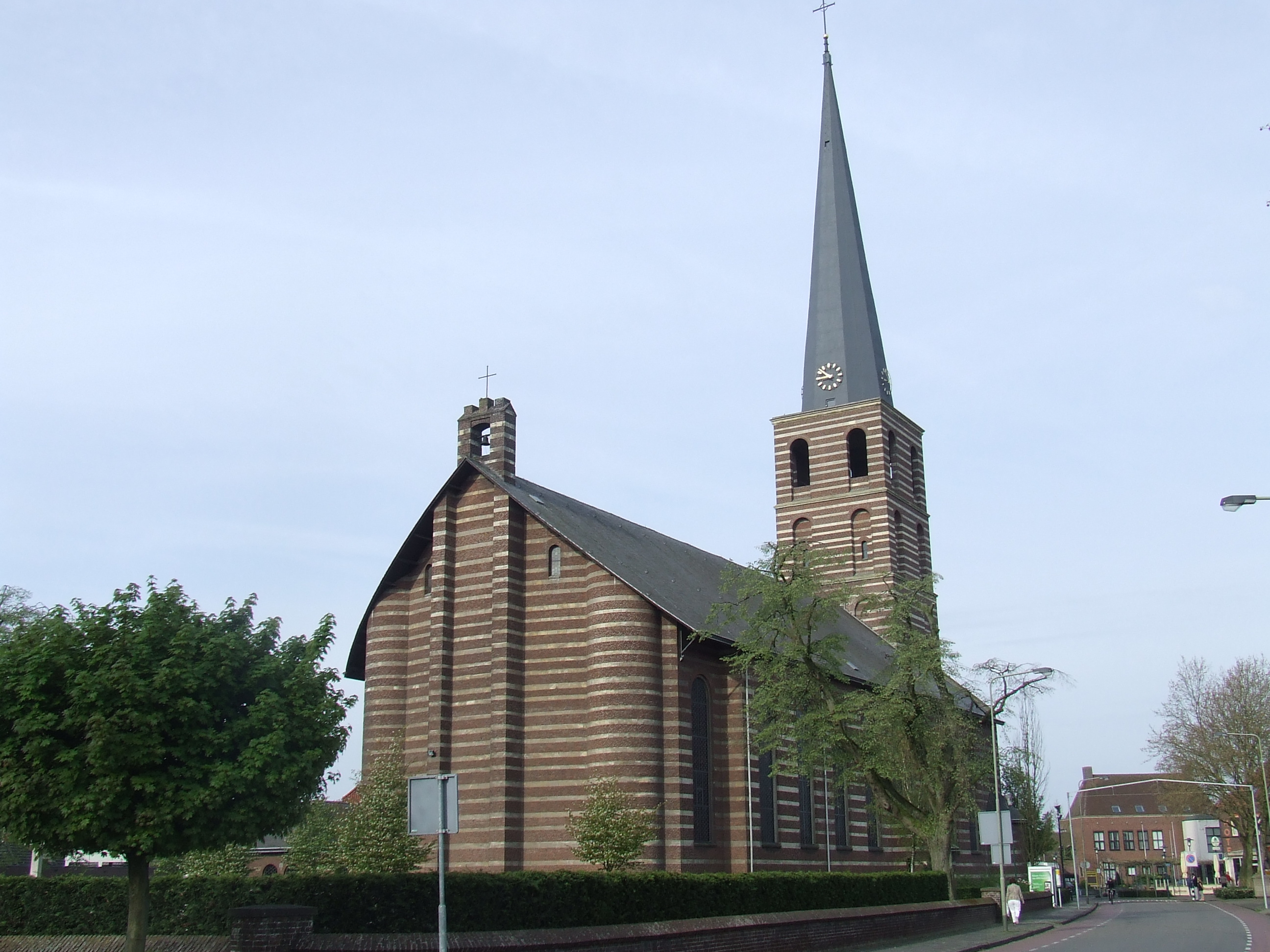

- Flag Coat of arms

- Location in the Netherlands Location in the province of Limburg in the Netherlands
- Coordinates: 51°21′N 5°53′E
- Country: Netherlands
- Province: Limburg
- Municipality: Peel en Maas

Area
  - Total: 2.80 km^{2} (1.08 sq mi)
- Elevation: 34 m (112 ft)

Population (2021)
  - Total: 5,120
  - Density: 1,830/km^{2} (4,740/sq mi)
- Time zone: UTC+1 (CET)
  - Summer (DST): UTC+2 (CEST)
- Postal code: 5768
- Dialing code: 077

Meijel (Dutch: [ˈmɛi.əl]; Limburgish: Méél) is a former municipality and a village in south-eastern Netherlands.

== History ==
The village was first mentioned in 1303 as "Iohannes et Henricus fratres dicti van der Vloet de Meyele". The etymology is uncertain. It might mean "middle of the forest". Meijel developed on a sandy ridge in the raised bog of the Peel. It became a free heerlijkheid (no fief). In 1716, it became part of the Austrian Upper Guelders.

The Catholic St Nicolaas Church is a three-aisled church with a wide tower which was constructed from 1953 to 1955 to replace the church which was destroyed in 1944.

Meijel was home to 996 inhabitants in 1840. It was severely damaged during World War II during a failed German counter attack. Meijel was an independent municipality until 2010 when it was merged into Peel en Maas.
